= Rümmelsheim =

- Municipality
- Coat of arms

- Location of Rümmelsheim within Bad Kreuznach district
- Interactive map of Rümmelsheim
- Location within Germany Location within Rhineland-Palatinate
- Coordinates: 49°56′04″N 07°51′43″E
- Country: Germany
- State: Rhineland-Palatinate
- District: Bad Kreuznach
- Municipal assoc.: Langenlonsheim-Stromberg
- Subdivisions: 2

Government
  - Mayor (2019–24): Hartmut Merkelbach (FW)

Area
  - Total: 3.08 km^{2} (1.19 sq mi)
- Elevation: 180 m (590 ft)

Population (2025-12-31)
  - Total: 1,467
  - Density: 476/km^{2} (1,230/sq mi)
- Time zone: UTC+01:00 (CET)
  - Summer (DST): UTC+02:00 (CEST)
- Postal codes: 55452
- Dialling codes: 06721
- Vehicle registration: KH
- Website: www.ruemmelsheim-burg-layen.de

Rümmelsheim is an Ortsgemeinde – a municipality belonging to a Verbandsgemeinde, a kind of collective municipality – in the Bad Kreuznach district in Rhineland-Palatinate, Germany. It belongs to the Verbandsgemeinde Langenlonsheim-Stromberg, whose seat is in Langenlonsheim. Rümmelsheim is a winegrowing village.

== Geography ==
=== Location ===
Rümmelsheim lies southwest of Bingen am Rhein and north-northwest of Bad Kreuznach in the Trollbach valley, west of the Nahe, just upstream from where it empties into the Rhine. The Trollbach itself flows through the village.

=== Neighbouring municipalities ===
Clockwise from the north, Rümmelsheim's neighbours are the municipalities of Münster-Sarmsheim, Dorsheim, Waldlaubersheim and Waldalgesheim, the first and last of which lie in the neighbouring Mainz-Bingen district, while the other two likewise lie within the Bad Kreuznach district. Rümmelsheim (Bad Kreuznach district) also comes within several metres of Langenlonsheim, but does not actually touch it, while the village of Weiler bei Bingen (Mainz-Bingen district) lies roughly as far away to the north as the village of Münster-Sarmsheim does to the northeast, but Münster-Sarmsheim's municipal area lies between the two.

=== Constituent communities ===
Rümmelsheim's Ortsteile are the main centre, also called Rümmelsheim, and the outlying centre of Burg Layen.

== History ==
Rümmelsheim and Burg Layen have been bound to each other throughout the ages. In 1125, Rümmelsheim had its first documentary mention as Rimilisheim. Rimilisheim and the castro Leiga ("fortified house of Layen") then belonged, together with feudal landholds in Waldlaubersheim, Genheim, Roth, Schweppenhausen and Eckenroth to the Lords of Bolanden. Lesser landholds in Rümmelsheim were held by the Knights of Stein, Löwenstein, Weierbach and Dalberg. Without doubt, Castle Layen's task was to keep watch over the road that ran by, through the Trollbach valley to the bizarre crag formations up on the heights. The castle's name stems from its standing on a Lay, that is to say, stone (the same word element can still be seen today in "Loreley"). Built in the 12th century and reconstructed about 1680, remnants of the castle still stand today. The village of Rümmelsheim was at this time, as were Laubenheim and Heddesheim too, bound with the town of Bingen by a mutual support agreement. In 1772, Rümmelsheim passed by way of sale to the Lordship of Bretzenheim. In the time of French rule (1796-1814), Rümmelsheim belonged beginning in 1800 to the Mairie (later Bürgermeisterei, but in either case "Mayoralty") of Waldalgesheim, whose seat was in 1870 moved to Bingerbrück. At this time, Rümmelsheim had 420 inhabitants. In the course of administrative restructuring in Rhineland-Palatinate, Rümmelsheim passed to the Verbandsgemeinde of Langenlonsheim in 1970.

=== Jewish history ===
Rümmelsheim had a Jewish community until 1906. It arose in the early 19th century. As far back as the 16th century, though, there were Jews living in the village. In 1548, a man named Mosse von Rimelsheim had his name included on a protection money list. However, no further record of Jews in Rümmelsheim crops up until the 19th century. In the 19th century, the number of Jewish inhabitants developed as follows: in 1808, there were 31 (of all together 405 inhabitants); in 1843, 48 (of 654); in 1848, 48 (in 9 families); in 1858, 45 (of 743); in 1885, 29 (of 896). In 1823, the Jewish families living in Waldalgesheim and Weiler bei Bingen were assigned to the Rümmelsheim Jewish community. Until then, the Jews in Waldalgesheim had felt more like part of the Schweppenhausen synagogue congregation, while the ones in Weiler had felt the same way about belonging to the congregation in Bingen. Until 1892, the Jewish families living in Bingerbrück also belonged to the Rümmelsheim Jewish community. Living in Waldalgesheim in 1823 were 8 Jews, and by 1843 it was 9 (of all together 860 inhabitants). In 1848, it was 8 again (Families Simon Stern and Schlachter), in 1858 it was 5 (of 915) and in 1885, 11 (of 1,230). Living in Weiler in 1823 were 5 Jews, and by 1843 it was 24 (of all together 884 inhabitants). In 1848, it was 12 (in 3 families), in 1858 it was 6 (of 1,033) and in 1885, 2 (of 1,394). In 1850, the following Jewish families were living in the three villages: in Rümmelsheim: Mathias Marx, David Marx, Mathias Marx, Coppel Mayer, Jacob Stern, Sebastian Stern, Raphael Stern, Servatius Stern, Joseph Stern, Joseph Marx and Carl Wohlgemuth; in Waldalgesheim: Simon Stern; in Weiler: Joseph Berg and Wendel Berg. In the way of institutions, there were a synagogue (see Synagogue below), a Jewish religious school and a graveyard in Rümmelsheim where Jews from both Rümmelsheim and Waldalgesheim were buried (see Jewish graveyard below); the Jews in Weiler had their own graveyard. To provide for the community's religious needs, a schoolteacher was hired, who also busied himself as the hazzan and the shochet. The Jews in Weiler also availed themselves of his services, for they could not afford their own. In 1848, Carl Wohlgemuth was working as an "unpaid cantor". He was at the same time the synagogue head, but had to take his leave in 1852 on health grounds. His successor was Raphael Stern. A few years later, the synagogue head was Ferdinand Stern, and beginning in 1885, Elias Stern. Towards the end of the 19th century, most of the Jewish families moved away from the village, and in 1906, the Rümmelsheim Jewish community was dissolved. The last member of the former Jewish community moved to Bingen in 1918. In 1925, no more Jewish inhabitants were being counted in Rümmelsheim. Still living in Waldalgesheim were master butcher Sally Stern's and tradesman Willy Hessel's families, while Simon Berg's family still lived in Weiler. The first two managed to emigrate to the United States. Simon Berg, then living in Bingen, and his daughter Lilly, then living in Friedberg, were both deported to the camps. According to the Gedenkbuch – Opfer der Verfolgung der Juden unter der nationalsozialistischen Gewaltherrschaft in Deutschland 1933-1945 ("Memorial Book – Victims of the Persecution of the Jews under National Socialist Tyranny") and Yad Vashem, of all Jews who either were born in Rümmelsheim, Waldalgesheim or Weiler bei Bingen or lived there for a long time, 16 died in the time of the Third Reich (birthdates in brackets):

- From Rümmelsheim:
1. Hedwig Eis née Stern (1879)
2. Lina Goldschmidt née Stern (1888)
3. Eugenie Marx née Marx (1881)
4. Leo Marx (1886)
5. Heinrich Stern (1888)
6. Rudolf Stern (1876)
7. Bertha Wetzler née Stern (1875)
8. Selma Zacharias née Grünewald (1888)
- From Waldalgesheim:
1. Isabella Kaufmann née Stern (1881)
2. Dina Müller née Stern (1870)
3. August Adolf Stern (1877)
4. Julius Stern (1883)
- From Weiler bei Bingen:
1. Simon Berg (1869)
2. Isabella Kahn née Berg (1898)
3. Luisa Kann née Berg (1864)
4. Lilly Löwenthal née Berg (1902)

=== Population development ===
Rümmelsheim's population development since Napoleonic times is shown in the table below. The figures for the years from 1871 to 1987 are drawn from census data:

Year	Inhabitants
1815	453
1835	730
1871	807
1905	879
1939	860

Year	Inhabitants
1950	977
1961	963
1970	1,013
1987	1,063
2005	1,428

== Religion ==
As at 31 January 2014, there are 1,376 full-time residents in Rümmelsheim, and of those, 343 are Evangelical (24.927%), 735 are Catholic (53.416%), 2 are Lutheran (0.145%), 1 belongs to the New Apostolic Church (0.073%), 15 (1.09%) belong to other religious groups and 280 (20.349%) either have no religion or will not reveal their religious affiliation.

== Politics ==
=== Municipal council ===
The council is made up of 16 council members, who were elected by proportional representation at the municipal election held on 7 June 2009, and the honorary mayor as chairman. The municipal election held on 7 June 2009 yielded the following results:

Year	SPD	CDU	FWG	Total
2009	–	6	10	16 seats
2004	3	8	5	16 seats

=== Mayor ===
Rümmelsheim's mayor is Hartmut Merkelbach.

=== Coat of arms ===
The municipality's arms might be described thus: Per pale Or a cross Patriarchal mounted on one degree azure and sable in chief a chevron argent under which a bunch of grapes slipped of the first.

== Culture and sightseeing ==
=== Buildings ===
The following are listed buildings or sites in Rhineland-Palatinate's Directory of Cultural Monuments:

==== Rümmelsheim (main centre) ====
- Evangelical church, Hohlstraße 18 – Gothic Revival aisleless church, about 1900
- Saint Lawrence's Catholic Parish Church (Pfarrkirche St. Laurentius), Hauptstraße – aisleless church, essentially Classicist, 1834, Baroque Revival transept with west tower, 1919/1929, architect Peter Marx, Trier
- Flurstraße 1 – Baroque timber-frame house, partly solid, possibly from the 17th century
- Hauptstraße – warriors' memorial 1914–1918; cast-stone sarcophagus, lower structure with fountain, 1920s, expanded after 1945
- Hauptstraße 11 – town hall, former school; Baroque Revival plastered building, hipped mansard roof, marked 1911
- Hauptstraße 15 – Late Baroque timber-frame house, plastered, possibly from the late 18th century
- Hauptstraße 23 – estate complex; timber-frame house, partly solid, marked 1832, commercial building, partly timber-frame
- Oberstraße 32 – Catholic rectory; cube-shaped building with hip roof; Bauhaus, Neoclassical and Heimatstil motifs, 1931
- Lookout tower; quarrystone building, 1909/1910
- Jewish graveyard, "Auf dem Horet" (monumental zone) – opened before 1808 (?), six gravestones, from 1848 to the 20th century (see Jewish graveyard below)

==== Burg Layen ====
- Burg-Layen, Burg-Layer Straße – about 1200; Romanesque keep, bits of ringwall, small round tower, gable wall of a house, 16th century; no. 16: Late Gothic lintel marked 1534, way into cellar marked 1530
- Village core (monumental zone), Burg-Layer Straße 1–8 – historic central area with wineries, 18th century to earlier half of the 20th century
- Burg-Layer Straße 3 – estate complex; house with hipped mansard roof, marked 1732, alterations in the 19th century
- At Burg-Layer Straße 15 – spolia, Baroque relief, 18th century

==== Synagogue ====
In Rümmelsheim, the synagogue is believed to have been built in 1808, although by 1848 it had fallen into a very poor state. According to Waldalgesheim's then mayor, the house of worship was a "cabin on the point of falling down". This might also have been why the Jews living in Waldalgesheim began attending synagogue in Schweppenhausen and those living in Weiler bei Bingen began attending synagogue in Bingen. In 1852, the Rümmelsheim synagogue was renovated. It was closed permanently no later than the time when the Rümmelsheim Jewish community was dissolved in 1906. In the 1920s, after the lasst Jews had left Rümmelsheim, Moritz Marx (formerly living in Rümmelsheim, now in Bingen) worried about the synagogue, which had now been left to go to ruin. It became a storehouse for equipment, automotive supplies and chemical fertilizers, and was falling ever further into disrepair. In August 1928, Bingen lawyer Richard Strauss acquired trusteeship over the former Rümmelsheim synagogue community's property. In March 1929, he arranged the synagogue's sale, which was completed in December 1930. In 1931, the former synagogue building was torn down. Its location was the street An der Bach (a name that no longer appears on maps).

==== Jewish graveyard ====
Rümmelsheim's Jewish graveyard was laid out no later than 1808. Laid to rest here were not only Jewish inhabitants from Rümmelsheim but also those from Waldalgesheim. Only six gravestones, in varying states of preservation, still stand at the graveyard. Of these, only one is still fully legible (the stone for Wolfgang Stern, 1844–1913). The graveyard's area is 975 m^{2} spread over two parcels of 790 m^{2} and 185 m^{2}. The graveyard lands were not sold off in the time of the Third Reich. Even in 1958, the Rümmelsheim cadastral register still listed the Rümmelsheim synagogue community, which had ceased to exist more than half a century earlier, as the owner of those parcels. The graveyard lies 2 km northwest of the village in the woodland known as Horet, not far from the Waldlaubersheim Jewish graveyard.

== Economy and infrastructure ==
=== Transport ===
Running through Rümmelsheim's southern outskirts is the Autobahn A 61 (Koblenz–Ludwigshafen), although the nearest interchange is in neighbouring Dorsheim 1 km away (Interchange 48, Rümmelsheim/Dorsheim). Roughly parallelling the Autobahn is Kreisstraße 41 and running through the village itself is Kreisstraße 43. There are also bus services, one that runs (mostly) hourly to railway stations in Münster-Sarmsheim (Regionalbahn) and Bingen (regional and national) and another to Bad Kreuznach. Also serving nearby Laubenheim is a railway station on the Nahe Valley Railway (Bingen–Saarbrücken) with hourly connections in both directions, with Bingen (Rhein) Hauptbahnhof and Bad Kreuznach station both lying less than 10 km away. Frankfurt Airport and Frankfurt-Hahn Airport can each be reached by highway in roughly 45 minutes.

=== Winegrowing ===
Rümmelsheim belongs to the Nahetal Winegrowing Area within the Nahe wine region. Eighteen winegrowing operations are active within the municipality, and the area planted with vineyards is 114 ha. Some 77% of the wine grown here is white wine varieties (as at 2007). In 1979, there were still 45 active winegrowing operations, and the area planted with vineyards was almost twice what it is now at 216 ha. The following wineries (Weingüter) can be found in Rümmelsheim (those marked with an asterisk also run a Strausswirtschaft or Gutsausschank):

- Gutsausschank Weinheimer Hof*
- Höfer's Weingarten und Burgkeller*
- Schloßgut Armin Diel
- St. Barbarahof*
- Weingut Georg Forster
- Weingut Helmut und Michael Eckes
- Weingut Hof Breitenstein
- Weingut Johann Baptist Schäfer
- Weingut Michael Schäfer
- Weingut Otto Schäfer
- Weingut Schloßmühle Dr. Höfer
- Weingut Weinheimer Hof
- Weingut Winfried Finkenauer

=== Established businesses ===
Winegrowing is the municipality's foremost income earner, and besides that, there are some smaller businesses, mostly in the service sector. Rümmelsheim's outlying centre of Burg Layen is also home to WIV Wein International, a wine marketing company, whose turnover in 2012 was €540,600,000.

=== Education ===
Rümmelsheim has an all-day daycare centre and an all-day primary school. Higher schools and training centres must be sought out in the surrounding area in Bingen, Bad Kreuznach, Hargesheim and Stromberg.

== Famous people ==
=== Sons and daughters of the town ===
- Jakob Diel (1886–1969), German politician and winemaker, operator of Burg Layen
