= Roth, Bad Kreuznach =

German municipality in Bad Kreuznach district

Roth
- Municipality
- Coat of arms

- Location of Roth within Bad Kreuznach district
- Interactive map of Roth
- Location within Germany Location within Rhineland-Palatinate
- Coordinates: 49°56′40″N 7°48′06″E
- Country: Germany
- State: Rhineland-Palatinate
- District: Bad Kreuznach
- Municipal assoc.: Langenlonsheim-Stromberg

Government
  - Mayor (2019–24): Helmut Höning

Area
  - Total: 0.82 km^{2} (0.32 sq mi)
- Elevation: 300 m (980 ft)

Population (2025-12-31)
  - Total: 311
  - Density: 380/km^{2} (980/sq mi)
- Time zone: UTC+01:00 (CET)
  - Summer (DST): UTC+02:00 (CEST)
- Postal codes: 55442
- Dialling codes: 06724
- Vehicle registration: KH
- Website: www.roth-bingen.de

Roth (German pronunciation: [ʁoːt]) is an Ortsgemeinde – a municipality belonging to a Verbandsgemeinde, a kind of collective municipality – in the Bad Kreuznach district in Rhineland-Palatinate, Germany. It belongs to the Verbandsgemeinde Langenlonsheim-Stromberg, whose seat is in Langenlonsheim.

== Geography ==
=== Location ===
Roth lies southwest of the Rhine in the Hunsrück. It sits at an elevation of some 350 m above sea level on a small mountain ridge. The municipal area measures 84 ha.

=== Neighbouring municipalities ===
Clockwise from the north, Roth's neighbours are the municipalities of Warmsroth, Waldalgesheim and Waldlaubersheim and the town of Stromberg, all of which likewise lie within the Bad Kreuznach district but for Waldalgesheim, which lies in the neighbouring Mainz-Bingen district.

== History ==
=== Middle Ages ===
In 1987, Roth celebrated its 800th anniversary, the grounds for doing so being the oldest known document that contains the village's name, one from Rupertsberg Abbey near Bingen from the year 1187. According to this parchment, now kept at the Koblenz State Archive, Archbishop of Mainz Conrad I freed the monastery and its holdings from episcopal taxation and put them under his protection. It seems certain that the "Roth" to which the document refers is indeed the subject of this article ("Roth" is otherwise a very common placename). Even if the document was not sealed, that is to say, never gained the force of law, the presence of that name in its text is still proof that the village existed that long ago. The name also says something about the village's beginnings. It literally means a clearing. What is unusual, though, is that the name does not have a prefix identifying its founder, owner, or leader as most others do, as seen, for instance, in Duchroth, Eckenroth, Gebroth, Kirschroth and Warmsroth, to name only the examples in this district (the last one, for instance, likely indicates a clearing owned by the city of Worms). According to the Germanist Adolf Bach (1890-1972), placenames ending in —rod (a more commonly occurring form) arose in the time from the 10th century to the 14th, and especially in the 12th and 13th, as clearings in woodland areas with more than 150 frost days each year, making their locations rather less favourable than places that had arisen in the treeless areas of the original landscape. It can thus be concluded that Roth likely arose not too long before this 1187 first documentary mention. Roth was originally laid out in the "original municipal area" of Waldlaubersheim. The Viergemeindewald ("Four-Municipality Forest") on which lie not only Roth but also Waldlaubersheim, Genheim (now a constituent community of Waldalgesheim), Warmsroth and Wald-Erbach, bears witness to the village's membership in this greater municipal area after 1589. In his Urkundliche Geschichte ("Documentary History"), Father Wagner cites from Rupertsberg Abbey's general directory of holdings (1200-1270) that Roth had to pay the abbey 11 Unzen and 6 Denare in rent on Martinmas (11 November), a contribution that may well hint at the holding's small significance. The jurisdiction by Schöffen (roughly "lay jurists") in Roth in those days was exercised by Hermanus von Genheim for Rodenkirchen (or Rothenkirchen) Abbey near Kirchheimbolanden. For the income that was bound with this, he and his wife Adelheid had to pay 20 Denare in interest. As a document filled out in Mainz has it, the knight Sir Heinrich of Glymendail and his wife Christina – who seemingly held a great many landholds in Roth – donated "produce benefits at Rod (Roth)" to Rupertsberg Abbey in 1283 to keep their memory alive with yearly Masses on the anniversaries of their deaths, and also donated further holdings near the village of Rod against a yearly annuity of 20 Malter of corn (likely either wheat or rye). Besides Rupertsberg Abbey, a lord from Brandenburg (now in Luxembourg) must also have owned an estate in Roth until 1417. In 1589, ten households were counted in Roth. The tithes were split between the Junker of Schönburg (Oberwesel), who got a two-thirds share, and the chaplain at Stromberg, who got the remaining third. Before the Reformation, the chaplain's third belonged to Rodenkirchen Abbey, and Roth itself belonged to the parish of Waldlaubersheim. Administratively, Roth, along with Genheim, which through its amalgamation with Waldalgesheim was removed from this historical tie, and Eckenroth belonged quite early on to the Stromburg (the castle above the town of Stromberg), which itself was under royal or Imperial ownership until 1156. In that year, Roth, along with the Stromburg, passed into the Counts Palatine's hands. It is thus understandable that even by 1410, the town of Bingen was offering the Roth villagers shelter within its walls in times when they were under attack. For this service, they had to contribute towards maintaining the fortifications and for the town's actual defence. While the number of households in Roth in 1589 had been, as mentioned above, ten, by 1789 – the year when the French Revolution broke out – it had only grown to 14.

=== Modern times ===
Local chronicler Martin Sinß, who published a village chronicle in 1965 on the occasion of the men's singing club's 70th anniversary, mentions in his work a document that reports the existence of a chapel in Roth consecrated to Saint Bartholomew. The village chronicle from 1877 says that it had been "provided" by Eibingen Abbey (whose site is now occupied by Saint Hildegard's Church in Rüdesheim an der Nahe-Eibingen). As far back as the early 16th century, this chapel had supposedly fallen into disrepair. After the Reformation, unconfirmed stories have it that it was shared by Protestants and Catholics. Given the small population – 11 Catholic families and 6 Protestant – the chapel's rehabilitation was not workable. Documents in the State Archive supposedly hint at efforts by the municipality in the late 18th century to reconstruct the chapel; however, ecclesiastical documents contain no mention of such a project. Both denominations had by that time been parochially united with Stromberg. The chapel is believed to have stood on the old churchyard, and for many years after it became a ruin, it is said that the Catholics still celebrated the anniversary of its consecration each year on the first Sunday in September, the Sunday after Saint Giles's Day (1 September). Directories from Rupertsberg Abbey show that in 1726, the monastery owned 79 Morgen, 1 Viertel and 22 Ruten in cropfields, 37 Morgen and 30 Ruten in meadows, and all together including gardens 121 Morgen, 2 Viertel and 17 Ruten of land. In 1785, the following Roth villagers are known to have paid levies to the abbey: Johann Scholler, Paul Feyer, Jacob Hartmann, Johann Jung, Blautzens, W. (W. Blautz?), Jacob Diehl, Peter Weber, Johann Blautz and Valentin Feyer. The following men also had to pay Obstgeld ("fruit money"): the Schultheiß Valentin Feyer, Joan Kraus, Johann Scholler and Johann Backes. Until 1770, it must still have been customary to yield up half the fruit harvest instead of paying rent. Moreover, Schultheiß Feyer, Jacob Diehl and Paul Feyer had to pay something called Wein-Zapfgeld ("winetap money"). Given what there is of documents from Rupertsberg Abbey, there would not seem to be much that is more specific about Roth. The Thirty Years' War and French King Louis XIV's wars of conquest must have destroyed many documents along with much else in the Palatinate. In the dale between Roth and the Schmittscher Hof (estate), which was built in 1929 by a rich aunt – known locally as die Dollartante, or "the dollar aunt" – who had made her fortune in the United States for her nephew, were likely once farms. It is said, although it is not actually known, that clearing work in the "Hufstadt" brought to light wall remnants. In 1816, after Napoleonic times had ended, Roth had 106 inhabitants. By 1876 this had grown to 193 inhabitants living in 27 households. The Amt of Stromberg was dissolved in 1798 and replaced with a French canton. After French rule had ended and the Congress of Vienna had delivered its terms in 1815, Roth passed to the Kingdom of Prussia and Stromberg once again became a Bürgermeisterei ("mayoralty"). In the 1930s, a local man named Peter Steyer II, who was quite old by this time, was still proudly boasting of his days in the Prussian Guard, and still had nothing but utter contempt for the "blind" Hessians. Roth was always one of the mayoralty's smaller municipalities. The chronicle even went so far as to say that it was nothing more than a hamlet belonging to the stronghold at Stromberg. The small municipal area defined the village's size and population in bygone times. The censuses of 1885, 1890 and 1895 yielded population figures of 176, 181 and 194 inhabitants respectively. Today's Ortsgemeinde of Roth has belonged since administrative restructuring in Rhineland-Palatinate in 1969 to the Verbandsgemeinde of Stromberg, as it once belonged to the Amt of Stromberg. With the amalgamation of Genheim with Waldalgesheim and the formation of the Mainz-Bingen district, Roth then lay with its 84 ha municipal area at the boundary between the Regierungsbezirke of Koblenz and Rheinhessen-Pfalz. With the dissolution of Rhineland-Palatinate's Regierungsbezirke in 2000, this is only a district boundary. Roth's other boundaries are formed by Landesstraße 214 and, roughly, by the Autobahn A 61 (Koblenz–Ludwigshafen).

==== 19th century ====
The oldest document on hand in the municipality itself is the chronicle mentioned above, which seems to begin in 1877, continuing with one interruption until 1912. It can be assumed that the chronicle was written by the village schoolteachers through the time when it was being kept. Municipal council's first protocol confirmed on 6 September 1888 Martin Heinrich's accession as reeve after having been elected on 1 August 1888. Mayor of Stromberg Hoßeus introduced the hitherto acting reeve into office in accordance with a decree from district chairman Agricola. "Decreed" councillors were Sturm, Piroth, Leinberger, Höning and Kruger. The council was then made up of the six Meistbeerbte (roughly "greatest heirs"). The most important issue cropped up as early as the second sessional protocol of 30 January 1889. in which municipal council refused to follow the "Decree of the Royal Government at Koblenz of 12 January 1872", which required the village to hire a night watchman. The grounds for this decision were that the village's safety would not be compromised and that its financial circumstances would not allow it to afford the 45 ℳ that this would have taken from the yearly budget. This seems understandable when one considers that in 1888, the municipality's yearly budget amounted to 3,539.19 ℳ. The populace earned its livelihood almost exclusively from agriculture. The grain and fruit harvests formed the regular, if low, income, dependent as they were on the weather's vagaries and freedom from agricultural pests. In times of drought, according to the relevant decisions from municipal council, some livestock had to be slaughtered and leaves were used instead of straw and grass as fodder, all of which was supplied from the Rother Wald (forest) beyond Warmsroth. Fruitgrowing seems to have played no unimportant role. In 1886 – a "good" year – 3,772 Zentner (a Zentner was roughly equivalent to 50 kg) of pomaceous and stone fruits were harvested by the 38 families living in Roth, by their own figures. This was reckoned to be worth 18,879 ℳ and more than 80% of the harvest was sold. The chronicler believed that these figures may have been understated "since the inhabitants, on the assumption that the yield might be used for taxation purposes, would rather declare less than more." Years in which there was no fruit harvest saw the villagers' income shrink noticeably. Today it is enough to take one look at the municipal area to see that the fruit harvest no longer plays any role. The extensive woodlands fell victim to agricultural machinery in the time following the Second World War. Scenes of the 18 members of the Roth Fruitgrowing and Gardening Club (founded in 1912) maintaining displays of no fewer than 27 varieties of apple for a whole week in a room at the Kasper Inn (owner: Adam Kasper) and even having local school groups come in to visit are no longer imaginable nowadays. Only hefty tax increases allowed the municipal budget to be balanced. The rental income from municipal land – in 1877 it was 328 ℳ – was low, and prices for tanbark were steadily sinking. Since Roth's forests were made up of trees that supplied tanbark to the tanning industry, this downturn in the market was keenly felt in the village. For the chronicler in 1896 it was a gleam of hope that many younger villagers were working at the mines in Waldalgesheim and Weiler, and that thus a "nicer earning" was coming into the village. Then, too, the concept of farms being run as a secondary occupation had subtly begun to work its way into the economic landscape, and was already having positive effects.

==== Early 20th century ====
Advancement kept on coming to the village. In July 1904, council decided, after a decree from the district board, to improve the way to the Trarbach-Bingen Provincial Road. Of the total cost of 1630 ℳ, the municipality bore 630 ℳ, which was raised in the form of compulsory work. Once the road had been improved, it passed into district ownership in 1906. In 1907, council granted the district waterworks leave to lay water pipes in the municipal streets, and in 1910, the never thoroughly unproblematic village water supply that had come through two wells with handpumps came to an end. The old well, which had been sunk before the parish hall, was supplemented in 1893 with another well, 18 m deep, near the new schoolhouse, but its yield was never very abundant. Only in the time just after the Second World War were these wells ever used again, when the centralized water supply had temporarily collapsed. At that time, a private well at the Ney household was also brought into service. In 1908 it was decided to link Roth to the telephone network, and to instal the first line at the reeve's house. After refusing to put up electric lighting in the streets in 1921 owing to the high cost, and continuing to use the old petroleum lamps, an application was made in 1927 to do just that after all, at a cost of 611.90 ℛℳ. Soon thereafter, the lights were shining, except on the street am Geißhübel.

==== World wars ====
One cannot speak of the earlier half of the 20th century without mentioning the world wars. In the First World War, five young men from Roth were lost, and in the Second, the toll was twelve. Against the other hardships that these wars brought along with them, however, the municipality came through the First World War relatively unscathed. It was only in the Second World War that any damage was done to the village itself, and that only slight. On 16 January 1945, some aerial bombs and phosphorus bombs were released too early by Allied fighter-bombers during a midday airstrike aimed at the Stromberg-Schweppenhausen railway line, striking the ground 70 m from the schoolhouse. Upon exploding, they burst some 30 windowpanes at the school and also damaged the roof and windows at the Reths house. It became dark in houses during the war, as cardboard for the time being had to replace glass. People got used to the, at first only nighttime but later also daytime, air raids. From the Christmas-tree-like bombing signals and the red glow on the horizon, locals could easily tell the direction to Frankfurt, Mainz, Koblenz or whatever other city was being bombed. Now and then, aerial bombs went astray and fell in Roth's municipal area, once in the "Betzheck" (rural cadastral area) and also near "Sonnets Scheune", a building (a barn, going by the name) where bricks were fired that stood where the Autobahn interchange can now be found. On Sunday 18 March 1945, American tank columns came rolling along Reichsstraße 50 from Stromberg as far as the turnoff towards Roth, and then trained their gun turrets on the village. For the prison camp billeted in various barns – among the inmates were three Americans – the retreat to the Rhine was over. A delegation from the prison camp bearing a white flag took to the roadway along with building councillor Wilhelm Claas, who had been bombed out in Essen and sought refuge in Roth – and who could speak some English – and they handed the camp over, along with the village. Thus did the war come to an end for Roth. The reeve, Peter Steyer I, who had served since 1916, was allowed to remain in office even under American occupation, which was a rare exception to what generally happened in that time.

==== Post-war era ====
Only the post-war era with its "Economic Miracle" and the introduction of technology into agriculture was to bring the village meaningful change. Already during the war, some young people from Roth had been studying at higher schools in Bingen am Rhein. The first to pass his Abitur was Josef Steyer, the miner Peter Steyer III's son. Ever more villagers sought livelihoods outside farming. While the number of full-time operations in agriculture had already shrunk to 12 by 1950, by 1987 there were only two left: Albrecht Ney and Rudi Sturm. The latter busied himself mainly as a winemaker, although all his vineyards lay outside Roth's municipal area in other municipalities. Even Mr. Ney, though, only worked 10% of the 100 ha that he owned within Roth's limits. The other 90% lay outside. This, by the way, made his lands bigger than the municipality, which is only 84 ha in size. The ore pit that had been so important during the war has been disused since 1971. The limeworks in Stromberg, too, is no longer an economic factor to the inhabitants of Roth. In 1980, 38.9% of the workforce commuted to Bingen, 13.2% to Mainz, 11% to Stromberg, 9.7% to Rümmelsheim (Pieroth), 6.6% to Rheinböllen (Tewes), 5.6% to Bad Kreuznach and the rest elsewhere. On the other hand, 27 workers now commute into the village where they have found jobs at two businesses. In connection with this, the road planned as Bundesstraße 400 and built as Autobahn 14 – and now called the A 61 – which brings Roth a great deal of noise and air pollution, has shown its positive side. With this highway, Roth is well linked to the road network. The best way to drive to Bingen, however, is still the former Bundesstraße 50, now called Landesstraße 214 (the same road along which the American tanks came to free the prisoners). After long and intensive efforts on the municipality's part, Roth was linked on 1 May 1970 to the Stromberg-Bingen bus route. From 1953 to 1978, there was a postal agency in Roth. The Gasthaus zur Alten Linde ("Inn at the Old Limetree"), owned by the Families Kasper and Orben, was closed in 1991, and thus vanished the village's social hub. Happily, however, Reinhold Sturm opened a Straußwirtschaft "in der Trift" (a street) on 8 August 2003, furnishing the village with a new social hub. Like all Straußwirtschaften, though, it is not open the year round, only for six or seven months out of the year. After the district extended the linking road to Bundesstraße 50 into the village centre in 1956, the municipality began to expand its village street step by step. Already by 1963, a mechanical sewage treatment plant had been built for DM 54,000, which still serves today as a retention basin. Since the building opportunities in the municipality were very limited, municipal council decided as early as 1965 to develop the "Im Hoppenacker"-"An dem Stemel" building plan so that, among other things, younger villagers would not be forced to build elsewhere. After the village streets had been updated in 1967, it became possible in the years that followed to begin work on the "An dem Stemel" phase of the building plan. As early as 1971, thoughts turned to satisfying the further demand for building land, and so, in the years that followed, a further building zone, called "In der Nonnenwies", was opened (this is actually a street's name, and it seems that until 1889, when the municipality gave up keeping cattle, it was a cow path called der Kuhweg, which means just that in German; its current name, however, means "in the nuns' meadow"). This new building zone drew quite a bit of interest from outside Roth, likely because of the favourable land prices and location. Roth's population figures, which for many years had been fairly constant, falling somewhere between 160 and 180 at any given time, had by 1987 risen to 286. From all records it is clear that the municipality was in great financial need. By 1955, Amtsbürgermeister Bogerts still believed that Roth would always be a "problem child" given its chronic poverty in assets and tax revenue. The municipal budget all too often ended up in the red. In the years from 1955 to 1971, the forest cost the municipality some DM 26,500; another DM 61,000 was spent in the years that followed, and in 1987, DM 12,000 more was spent. By selling plots of municipal land for the construction of the Autobahn in 1963, the municipality finally came into some money (so Mr. Bogerts declared – the same man who only eight years earlier had had such a grim forecast for Roth's financial future). The sales brought in DM 93,000. This seems to have been a turning point in the municipality's economic development. Higher population figures and a shift in livelihood circumstances have since considerably improved the municipality's economic power.

==== 21st century ====
Unfortunately, the municipality's financial situation worsened dramatically after building work on the old schoolhouse to convert it into a village community centre. The municipal budget in the years around the turn of the millennium was wholly unsatisfactory, marked as it was by deficits and other financial problems. Council, headed by mayor Helmut Höning, saw a solution to the problem in raising the municipality's population figures, but this would only be possible if more building land became available. Given the bad financial situation, this was not going to be easy. Nonetheless, a plan to do such a thing was developed. The landowners received a basic price for the land in advance, while the municipality took on the job of selling the lots. In 2006, the lots on the market were being offered for sale at a price of €99.50/m^{2}. After the 18 building lots had been sold and the appropriate measures had been undertaken, the accounting was done and the additional proceeds were paid out to the former landowners. On 9 July 2006, Roth's oldest inhabitant died at the age of 102. Mrs. Eva Hoch née Steyer (mayor Johann Steyer's sister) was born on 25 January 1904 and was married to Hans Hoch, whom she outlived by 35 years. They had two sons and one daughter. There is no record of anyone else in Roth ever having lived to such a great age. In 2009, the old bakehouse and former parish hall in the village centre was renovated from the ground up. A heating system was built in, the baking room was made state-of-the-art and on the upper floor, a mayor's room and an counselling room were made.

== Politics ==
=== Municipal council ===
The council is made up of 6 council members, who were elected by majority vote at the municipal election held on 7 June 2009, and the honorary mayor as chairman.

=== Mayors ===
Listed in the following table are the known heads of the village and municipality of Roth. Over the years they have borne such titles as Schultheiß, Vorsteher (both roughly meaning "reeve" or "village head"), Bürgermeister ("mayor") or Ortsbürgermeister ("village mayor", the currently customary title):

Date	Name	Remarks
1785	Valentin Feyer	—
1886-1887	Martin Partenheimer	had been reelected
1887-1888	Peter Piroth	died in 1888 after an accident
1888-1892	Martin Heinrich	—
1892-1898	Martin Partenheimer	—
1898-1904	Johann Eßner	—
1904-1916	Adam Sturm	—
1916-1946	Peter Steyer I	Johann Steyer's father
1946-1952	Adam Sturm	—
1952-1964	Johann Steyer	Peter Steyer I's son
1964-1999	Friedel Mehlig	—
1999-	Helmut Höning	current mayor

=== Mayor ===
Roth's mayor is Helmut Höning, and his deputies are Dr. Stefan Melinski and Georg Bootz.

=== Coat of arms ===
The municipality's arms might be described thus: Per bend sinister argent issuant from the line of partition an abbot's staff palewise gules and sable a lion's head erased Or langued and crowned of the second.

The municipality of Roth had its first documentary mention in a document from Rupertsberg Abbey near Bingen from the year 1187. This abbey later received harvests and other holdings in and near Roth. The charge on the dexter (armsbearer's right, viewer's left) side, the abbot's staff, is thus a reference to this abbey, which was led by an abbess. Two borderstones from 1726 likewise show an abbot's staff. The tinctures argent and gules (silver and red) are a reference to the Electorate of Mainz, whose archbishops were the abbey's lords protector. The charge on the sinister (armsbearer's left, viewer's right) side, the lion's head "erased" (that is, not showing any part of the neck) is a reduced form of the heraldic device once borne by Electoral Palatinate, and is thus a reference to the village's former allegiance to that state. It was as early as Friedrich I's time that Roth passed to the Counts Palatine of the Rhine, and it remained Electoral Palatinate domain until the 19th century.

=== Town partnerships ===
Roth fosters partnerships with the following places:

- Saint-Nicolas-lès-Cîteaux, Côte-d'Or, France since 1 June 1991

== Culture and sightseeing ==
=== Buildings ===
On Saturday 24 April 2010, the former schoolhouse became ready after its renovation. Sixty percent of the €110,000 cost of the job of converting it into a community centre was covered by a grant. A belltower had been built onto the nearby parish hall in 1935. The bell tolls the hour at 0700, 1200 and 1800, and also rings to announce a death in the village; until 1993 it also did so on the occasion of a burial. In this more recent round of renovations at the schoolhouse, the heating system was replaced with a heat pump, the stairway was renovated and made fireproof and the old schoolroom was made into a mayor's room and a bigger room for sessions. The building was given outer insulation and was painted, the windows and doors were renovated and the roof was newly slated. The parish hall was dedicated on this same Saturday at 1100 accompanied by the Roth/Seibersbach choir association and a picture exhibit. Handed out at the ceremony were some baked specialities from the old stone oven. The exhibit and the bakehouse can be visited until 1500, but beginning at 2000 at the new Alt Schul ("old school"), there is a picture show called Roth im 20. Jahrhundert ("Roth in the 20th Century"). On the renovated parish hall's end wall, Raimund Mehlig put the slogan Gott ward Mensch, Mensch bleib Mensch; die Zeit verrinnt, der Tod gewinnt ("God became man, man remain man; time trickles away, death wins"), framed in wrought-iron decoration done by his son Hans-Werner.

=== Clubs and events ===
The Roth men's singing club "Sangeslust", founded by the first village schoolteacher who lived in Roth, has existed since 1895. Its tuneful and community-promoting activities continue to form an important element in the municipality's life, whether they be for celebrations, jubilees or burials. After the bridge on the Autobahn offered its shelter from the rain, the club's Waldfest ("forest festival") became a much-loved Brückenfest ("bridge festival") held on the first weekend in May. Beginning in 1983, there was a women's club in the village that brought younger women together, and their activities became part of the kermis (church consecration festival, held in Roth on the first Sunday and Monday after 1 September, Saint Giles's day). On the occasion of Roth's 800th anniversary (of first documentary mention) in 1987, a cooking and baking book was published containing regional specialities. Unfortunately, the women's club folded in 1989. In 1982, municipal council dedicated the renovated Backes (standard German: Backhaus – bakehouse) with a hearty Backesfest. Ever since, this festival has been bringing locals and fanciers from the surrounding villages together on the first weekend in October with its Federweisser and Pellkartoffeln (potatoes boiled in their jackets) with liverwurst. The Backes also lays on fresh bread, Quetschenkuchen (a cake made with the variety of plum known as Quetsche or Zwetschge – Prunus domestica domestica) and Backeskrumbere ("bakehouse potatoes") made the old-fashioned way. Roth also has a local history club (Heimatverein Roth), a volunteer fire brigade, a German-French friendship club in connection with Roth's partnership with Saint-Nicolas-lès-Cîteaux (Deutsch-Französischer-Freundeskreis Roth e.V.) and a fire brigade promotional association (Feuerwehrförderverein Roth e.V.).

== Economy and infrastructure ==
=== Transport ===
Roth lies right at an interchange onto the Autobahn A 61 (Koblenz–Ludwigshafen). Running through the village itself is Kreisstraße 96, becoming Kreisstraße 48 when it crosses into the Mainz-Bingen district to the east. Running along the municipality's northern limit is Landesstraße 214, which going westwards leads into Stromberg just across the Autobahn, and going eastwards leads to Waldalgesheim, eventually joining with Bundesstraße 9/48 just across the Nahe from Bingen am Rhein. Indeed, it is also here, in Bingen's outlying centre of Bingerbrück, that the town's main railway station, Bingen (Rhein) Hauptbahnhof lies. It is served as a regional station by InterCity trains as well as one ICE line.

=== Education ===
According to the village chronicle, municipal council decided as early as 1880 to build a new schoolhouse. In the years that followed, though, the financing arrangements for it must have turned out to be impossible. The schoolchildren still had to attend the very poorly housed school at the parish hall, where the Catholic schoolteacher from Genheim held classes. In 1884, a problem arose with the schoolteacher Auerbach: he had "suddenly become flighty". The Schweppenhausen schoolteacher Weppler had to stand in for him in Roth. The Evangelical schoolchildren may well have gone to school in Stromberg. The "Royal Government" seems to have slowly come to see Roth's scholastic circumstances as unacceptable, and so in 1885, the government wanted to found a Genheim-Roth school association. The municipality, though, fought for its own school, and for a while, the people's petitions and their promise to accommodate the schoolchildren properly met with some success. Then, however, came the decree on 7 January 1887 that got the villagers up in arms: the Catholic schoolchildren were transferred to the Genheim Catholic school; the municipality also had to bear yearly school costs of 300 ℳ and also "for fire, 300 Wellen (standardized faggots) made free and small". The municipality found this sum unfair given the state "educational endowment" that had been transferred to the neighbouring village. Three hundred marks was a heavy burden on Roth's flimsy civic budget, for under the new schooling arrangement, the municipality was no longer allowed to levy the 45 ℳ that it had been customary to exact from Catholic parents for their children's schooling. The upshot was a long, drawn-out legal battle with Genheim; even the district chairman Agricola could not settle it. Possibly because of these circumstances, municipal council, headed by reeve Martin Heinrich and represented by councillors Partenheimer, Höning, Leinberger, Kruger, Piroth I and Sturm, with the prospect of certain aid, declared themselves ready on 30 October 1891 to plan specially the building of a "Catholic schoolhouse" in Roth. The plans to convert the parish hall were turned aside for lack of an acceptable means of housing the schoolteacher (it was only in 1938 that the old bakehouse was torn down and built anew, together with the oven). For 1,084 ℳ, the municipality acquired the land that it needed on the Geißhübel (a street). Roth bricklayer Eßner II's cost estimate was accepted. The chronicle says that the actual building cost was 17,000 ℳ, a sum to which the municipality itself only had to contribute some 1,500 ℳ. It had quite likely been cost-effective to make the bricks by firing earth that had been dug up right on the site. Nevertheless, the financing turned out to be anything but simple, for in 1893, grants that were not paid out in time made it necessary for Roth to seek a loan, at 4% interest, from the municipality of Schöneberg. After the building was finished, the Catholic schoolteacher from Genheim was transferred to Roth, and now Genheim's few Catholic schoolchildren had to walk to school in Roth (this "tradition" was also revived in the years after the Second World War when a Catholic denominational school was built in Roth). The Evangelical schoolchildren living in Roth seemingly also henceforth attended the new school in Roth. In 1966, a fire – believed to have been caused by arson – destroyed the schoolroom and other parts of the building. Irreplaceable was the village and school chronicle that had been being kept by successive schoolteachers. This was irretrievably lost in the fire. The building's instant reconstruction and the procurement of new school furniture, however, could not stand in the way of school politics, for the old one-room schoolhouses had already been sentenced to death. After the last village schoolteacher, Deptowicz, had been relocated, lessons at the Roth school were given only by stand-in teachers. Parents' and municipal council's petitions met with no success. Also unsuccessful was the petition against the directive to dissolve the village school on 1 August 1967 and bus the schoolchildren to either the Waldalgesheim Catholic denominational school or the Stromberg Christian interdenominational school that had been opened on 1 February 1966. So, the school at Roth, which had been dedicated in the autumn of 1894 shut its doors for good on 31 July 1967. Roth's schoolchildren were thereafter schooled in neighbouring Stromberg. The use of a school bus to get there, however, seemed to be cold comfort to the municipality against the loss of their school. Since 1972, however, the educational offerings for children from Roth have improved. Children aged 3 to 5 have since been attending the kindergarten in Stromberg sponsored by the Catholic Church. Although at first the parents had to arrange for their children's transportation to and from the kindergarten, state law has now mandated free transportation by bus. The municipality, however, must now pay the proportionate cost of this transportation.

== Famous people ==
=== Honorary citizens ===
- Friedel Mehlig (b. 29 April 1929 in Roth) since 1999

The first citizen to be so honoured by the municipality of Roth, for the many services done the community; former mayor (1964-1999).

=== Sons and daughters of the town ===
- Raimund Mehlig (b. 13 April 1925; d. 25 April 2010)

Local artist; his woodcarving craft was well known not only in Roth itself but throughout the area.
