= Stromberg (Verbandsgemeinde) =

Coordinates: 49.947°N 7.776°E

Stromberg is a former Verbandsgemeinde ("collective municipality") in the district of Bad Kreuznach, Rhineland-Palatinate, Germany. The seat of the Verbandsgemeinde was in Stromberg. On 1 January 2020 it was merged into the new Verbandsgemeinde Langenlonsheim-Stromberg.

The Verbandsgemeinde Stromberg consisted of the following Ortsgemeinden ("local municipalities"):

1. Daxweiler
2. Dörrebach
3. Eckenroth
4. Roth
5. Schöneberg
6. Schweppenhausen
7. Seibersbach
8. Stromberg
9. Waldlaubersheim
10. Warmsroth
