= Langenlonsheim (Verbandsgemeinde) =

Former municipality in Rhineland-Palatinate, Germany

Coordinates: 49.890°N 7.899°E

Langenlonsheim is a former Verbandsgemeinde ("collective municipality") in the district of Bad Kreuznach, Rhineland-Palatinate, Germany. The seat of the Verbandsgemeinde was in Langenlonsheim. On 1 January 2020, it was merged into the new Verbandsgemeinde Langenlonsheim-Stromberg.

== Municipalities ==
The Verbandsgemeinde Langenlonsheim consisted of the following Ortsgemeinden ("local municipalities"):

1. Bretzenheim
2. Dorsheim
3. Guldental
4. Langenlonsheim
5. Laubenheim
6. Rümmelsheim
7. Windesheim
