= Waldalgesheim =

- Municipality
- Coat of arms

- Location of Waldalgesheim within Mainz-Bingen district
- Interactive map of Waldalgesheim
- Location within Germany Location within Rhineland-Palatinate
- Coordinates: 49°57′04″N 7°50′11″E
- Country: Germany
- State: Rhineland-Palatinate
- District: Mainz-Bingen
- Municipal assoc.: Rhein-Nahe

Government
  - Mayor (2019–24): Stefan Reichert (CDU)

Area
  - Total: 16.01 km^{2} (6.18 sq mi)
- Elevation: 293 m (961 ft)

Population (2025-12-31)
  - Total: 3,968
  - Density: 247.8/km^{2} (641.9/sq mi)
- Time zone: UTC+01:00 (CET)
  - Summer (DST): UTC+02:00 (CEST)
- Postal codes: 55425
- Dialling codes: 06721
- Vehicle registration: MZ
- Website: www.waldalgesheim.de

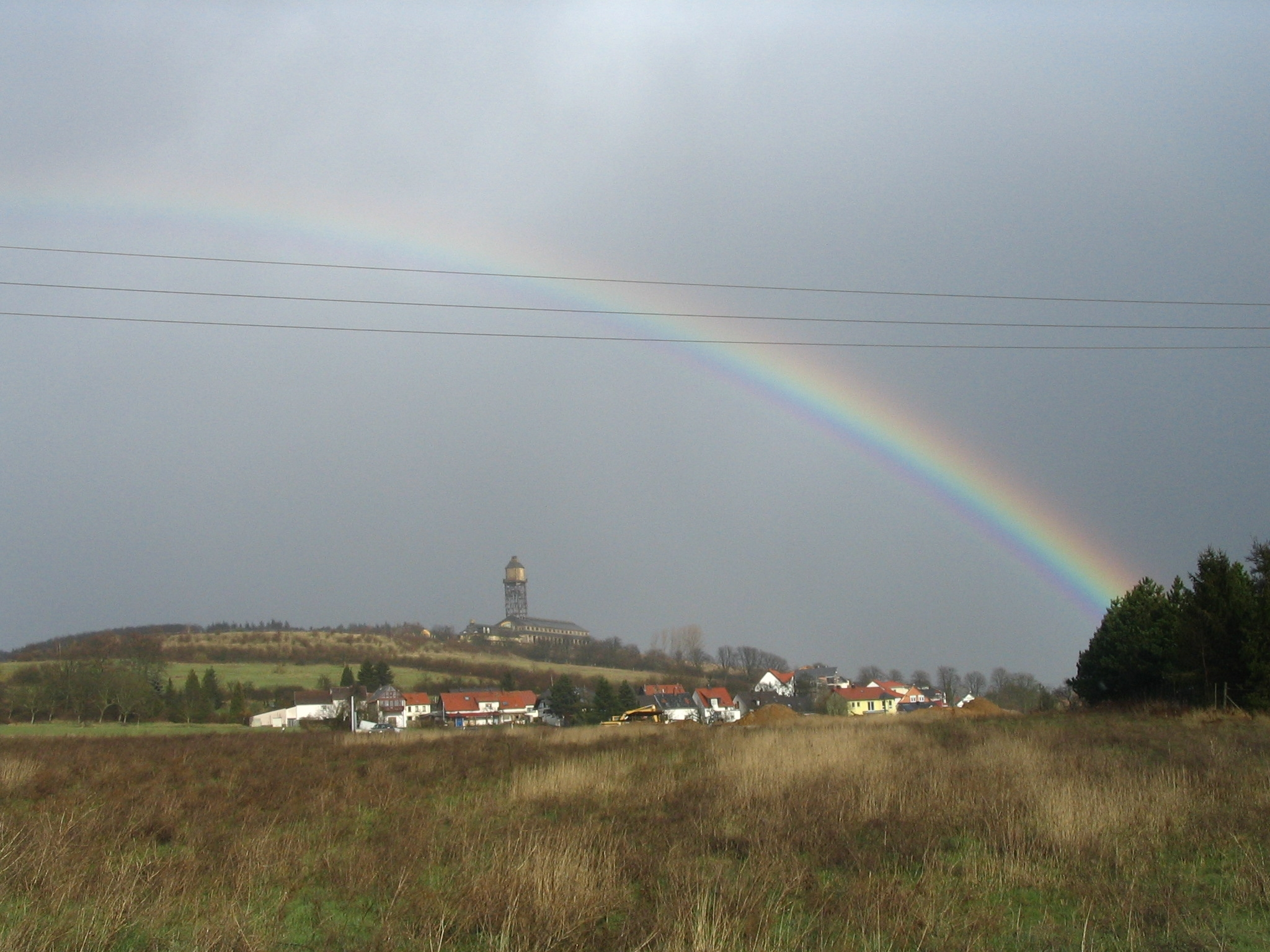
The Grube Amalienhöhe looms over Waldalgesheim

Waldalgesheim is an Ortsgemeinde – a municipality belonging to a Verbandsgemeinde, a kind of collective municipality – in the Mainz-Bingen district in Rhineland-Palatinate, Germany. It is best known as the site of the Iron Age Waldalgesheim chariot burial.

The winegrowing centre belongs to the Verbandsgemeinde of Rhein-Nahe, whose seat is in Bingen am Rhein, although that town is not within its bounds. Since 2003, Waldalgesheim has been part of the Rhine Gorge UNESCO World Heritage Site.

== Geography ==
=== Location ===
Waldalgesheim lies on the southeast edge of the Hunsrück between Koblenz and Bad Kreuznach, south of the Bingen Forest (Binger Wald) and west of the river Nahe, some 6 km west of Bingen.

=== Neighbouring municipalities ===
Waldalgesheim’s neighbours are Weiler, Rümmelsheim and Stromberg, and towards Genheim Waldlaubersheim, Roth and Schweppenhausen.

=== Constituent communities ===
Genheim is Waldalgesheim’s only outlying Ortsteil.

== History ==
The village is mainly famous as the site of the Waldalgesheim chariot burial (German: Waldalgesheimer Fürstengrab), a 4th-century BC Celtic princely chariot burial, discovered in 1869. The jewellery found in the burial has given its name to the "Waldalgesheim Style" of artifacts of the La Tène culture, a more fluid and confident style of decoration than early Celtic art, with Greek and Etruscan influences. The objects from the burial site were dug up by the farmer who found them on his land. The site was not investigated by archaeologists, and has recently been covered by a housing development.

In 784, Waldalgesheim had its first documentary mention in the Lorsch codex as Alagastesheim.

On 7 November 1970, the formerly self-administering municipality of Genheim was amalgamated.

== Politics ==
=== Municipal council ===
The council is made up of 21 council members, counting the part-time mayor, with seats apportioned thus:

	SPD	CDU	FDP	FWG	Total
2004	5	11	2	2	20 seats

(as at municipal election held on 13 June 2004)

=== Town partnerships ===
- Ratten, Weiz, Styria, Austria

== Culture and sightseeing ==
=== Buildings ===
There is a castlelike building complex at the “Dr. Geier” ore and manganese pit, built between 1917 and 1919, as well as a miners’ village.

The municipality is known for its vineyards, and as the site of a late 4th-century BC chariot burial that defines a stage in the La Tène culture that is generally known as "Waldalgesheim style". The lack of weapons recovered from the tomb and the fine gold torc, bracelets and anklets, have led archaeologists to infer that the deceased was a woman. The finds from this elite burial, stumbled upon by a farmer in 1869, are preserved in the Rheinisches Landesmuseum, Bonn.

=== Sport ===
The local sport club SV Alemannia Waldalgesheim was founded in 1910 and is made up of football, tennis, basketball, children’s gymnastics, aerobics, mother-and-child gymnastics and jazz dancing departments. The “flagship” department is the first-named one, whose first team in the 2007/08 season managed for the first time to advance from the Verbandsliga to the Oberliga Südwest.

== Economy and infrastructure ==
=== Transport ===
The Autobahn A 61 can be reached through the Waldlaubersheim interchange, roughly 4 km away. Alternatively, lying roughly the same distance away is the Stromberg interchange, also on the A 61.

== Famous people ==
- Stephan Lück (b. 9 January 1806 in Linz am Rhein, d. 3 November 1883 in Trier), theologian, Cathedral Music Director at Trier and publisher, worked from 1831 to 1835 as a clergyman in Waldalgesheim.

== Other ==
A new concept was opened with the Route der Industriekultur Rhein-Main (“Rhine-Main Industrial Culture Route”), along which industrial building works are to be brought together into an adventure route highlighting industrial culture in the Frankfurt Rhine Main Region, running the 160 km between Miltenberg and Bingen by way of Frankfurt am Main
