= Guldental =

- Municipality
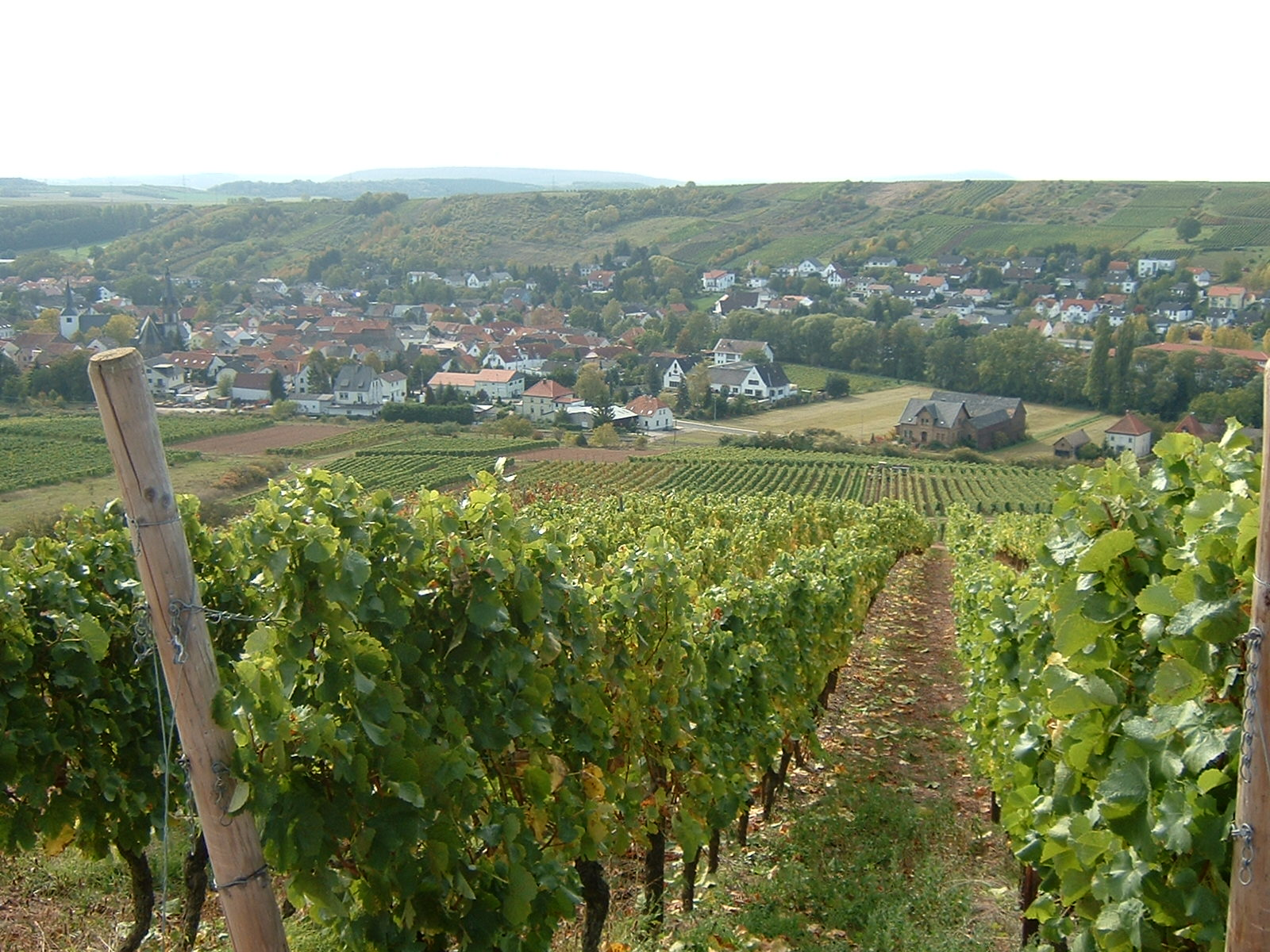

- Coat of arms

- Location of Guldental within Bad Kreuznach district
- Interactive map of Guldental
- Location within Germany Location within Rhineland-Palatinate
- Coordinates: 49°53′31″N 07°50′28″E
- Country: Germany
- State: Rhineland-Palatinate
- District: Bad Kreuznach
- Municipal assoc.: Langenlonsheim-Stromberg

Government
  - Mayor (2019–24): Elke Demele (SPD)

Area
  - Total: 12.99 km^{2} (5.02 sq mi)
- Elevation: 140 m (460 ft)

Population (2025-12-31)
  - Total: 2,500
  - Density: 190/km^{2} (500/sq mi)
- Time zone: UTC+01:00 (CET)
  - Summer (DST): UTC+02:00 (CEST)
- Postal codes: 55452
- Dialling codes: 06707
- Vehicle registration: KH
- Website: www.guldental.de

Guldental is an Ortsgemeinde – a municipality belonging to a Verbandsgemeinde, a kind of collective municipality – in the Bad Kreuznach district in Rhineland-Palatinate, Germany. It belongs to the Verbandsgemeinde Langenlonsheim-Stromberg, whose seat is in Langenlonsheim. With a population of some 2,900 inhabitants, Guldental is the biggest rural winegrowing community on the Nahe.

== Geography ==
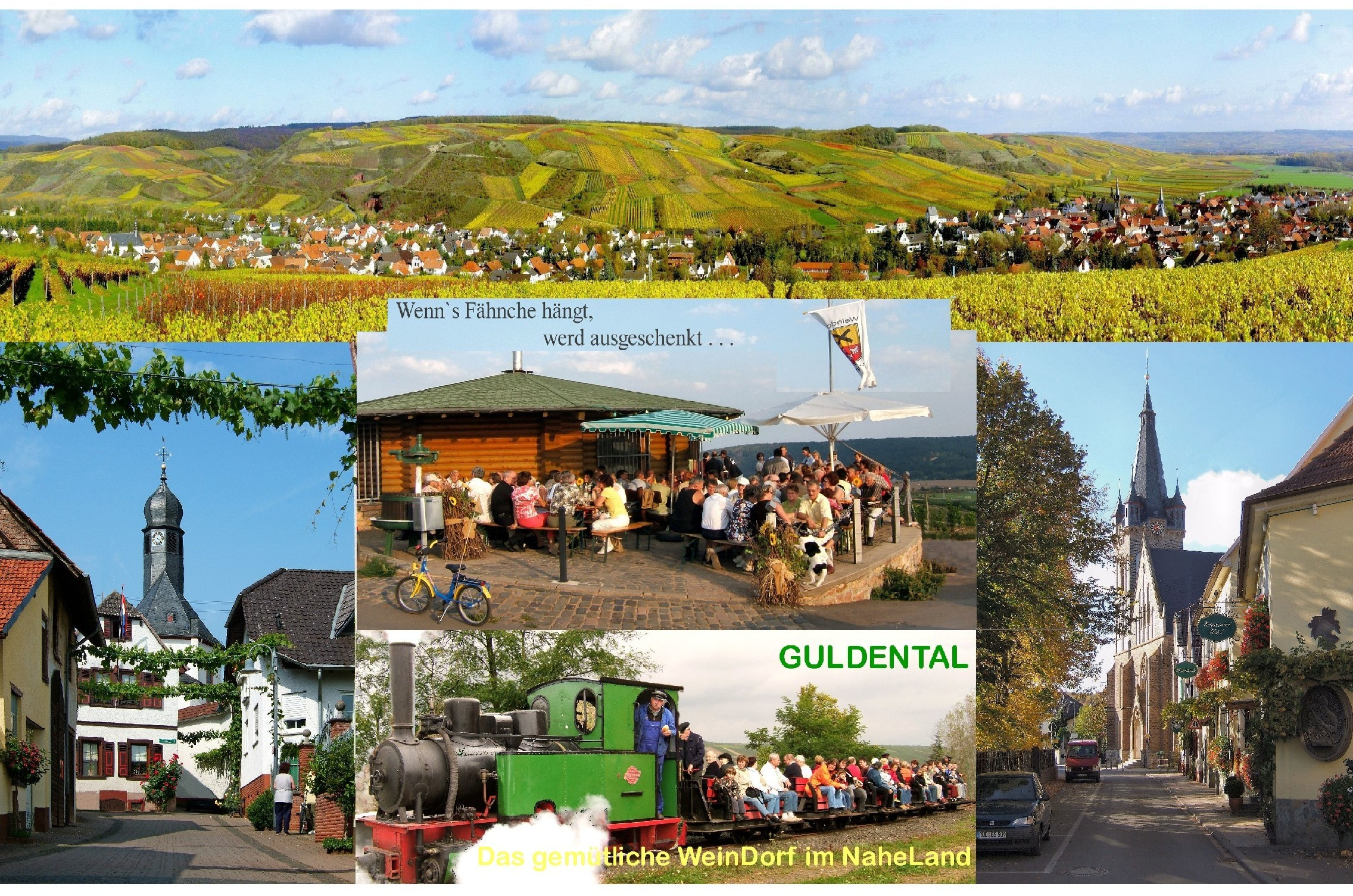
Guldental

=== Location ===
Guldental lies in the Naheland – the land lining each side of the Nahe – among the southern foothills of the Hunsrück, on the Guldenbach.

=== Neighbouring municipalities ===
Clockwise from the north, Guldental's neighbours are the municipality of Langenlonsheim, the municipality of Bretzenheim, the town of Bad Kreuznach, the municipality of Hargesheim, the municipality of Gutenberg and the municipality of Windesheim.

=== Constituent communities ===
Guldental's Ortsteile are Heddesheim and Waldhilbersheim. Also belonging to Guldental are the outlying homesteads of Breitenfelserhof and Ackermühle.

== History ==
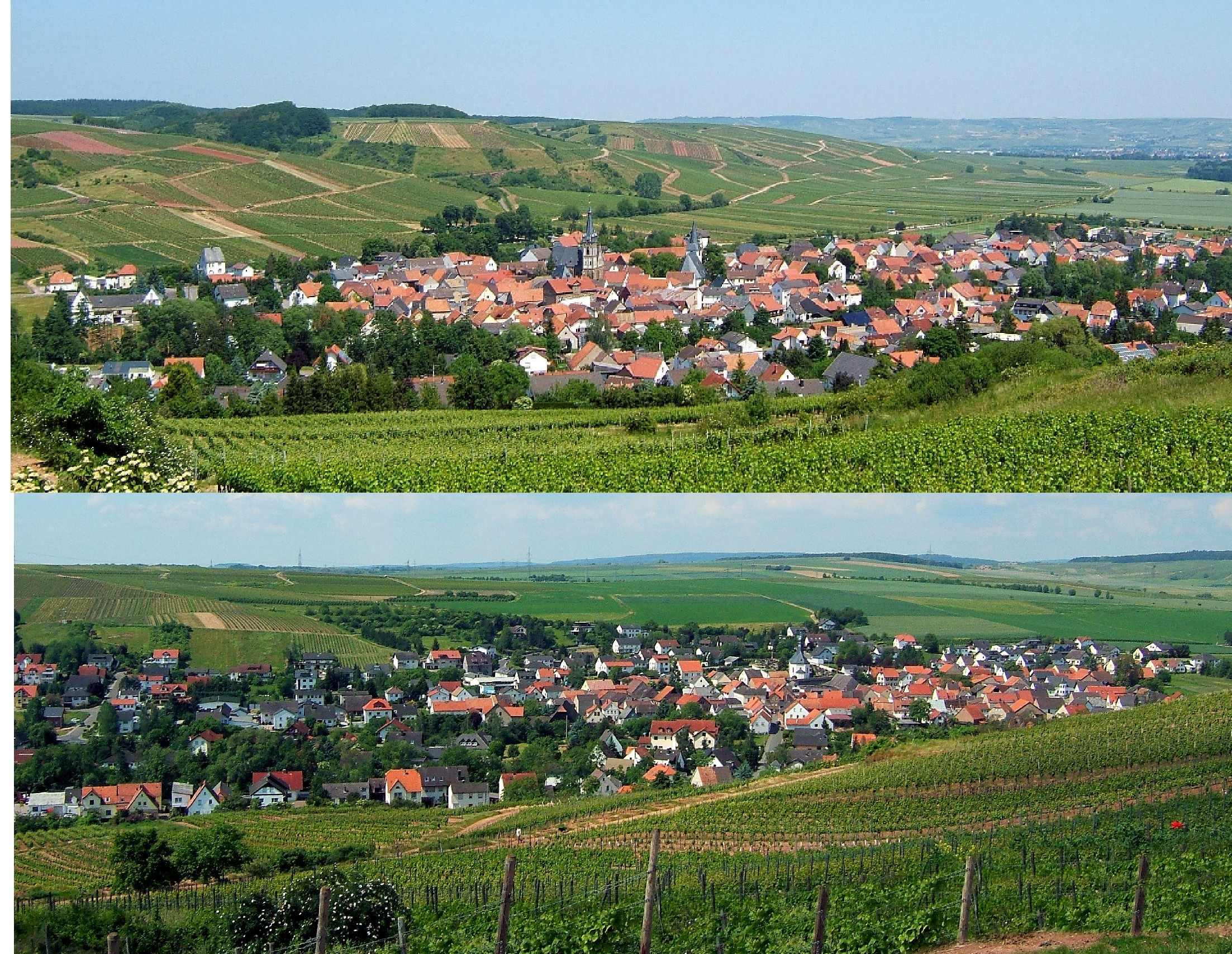
Constituent community of Heddesheim above Constituent community of Waldhilbersheim below

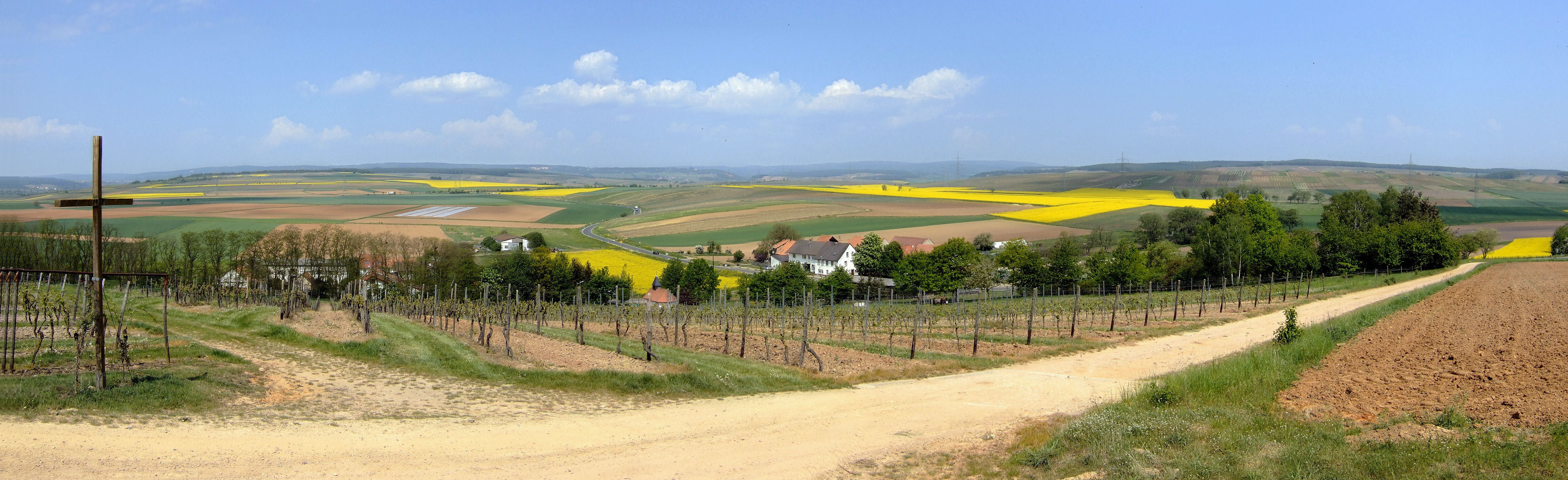
Breitenfelserhof

As early as 1163, the landhold of Hetdenesheim (Heddesheim) had its first documentary mention and already by 700 years ago it was one of the greater villages in what is now the Bad Kreuznach district. Under Revolutionary/Napoleonic French rule, Heddesheim was grouped into the Mairie ("Mayoralty") of Langenlonsheim in 1800. The village, now constituent community of Guldental, Waldhilbersheim is likewise very old. Beginning as long ago as 1200, it began to crop up in documents. In 1800, however, it was grouped into the Mairie of Windesheim, and in 1939 into the Amt of Langenlonsheim. Today's Ortsgemeinde of Guldental was formed in the course of administrative restructuring in Rhineland-Palatinate on 7 June 1969 through the merger of the hitherto self-administering municipalities of Heddesheim (Nahe) with its outlying centre of Breitenfelser Hof and Waldhilbersheim. Guldental thus became the biggest winegrowing community on the Nahe, with 417 ha of land given over to vineyards. The vineyards to the south run for 6 km along the Guldenbach. Winegrowing in this area is witnessed quite early on.

=== Jewish history ===
Until the 1930s, there was a small Jewish community in Waldhilbersheim to which Jews in Heddesheim – and thus in both villages that now make up Guldental – also belonged. It had come to be established at least as far back as the 18th century. In 1808, Waldhilbersheim counted 29 Jewish inhabitants. Living here about 1858 were 50 Jews in Waldhilbersheim and another 40 in Heddesheim, but thereafter the numbers began to shrink with emigration and depopulation. This small community also included the Jewish inhabitants in Laubenheim until 1895, when they became tied to the community in Langenlonsheim. By 1925, the Jewish population in Waldhilbersheim and Heddesheim had sunk to 8 and 29 respectively. In the mid 1920s, the head of the Jewish community was August Schneider. In the way of institutions, the Jewish community had a small synagogue, a religious school (believed to have been housed somewhere in the synagogue) and a graveyard. To supply the community's religious needs, a "worship official" was hired, at least temporarily, to do the jobs of religious teacher, prayer leader and shochet. According to the Gedenkbuch – Opfer der Verfolgung der Juden unter der nationalsozialistischen Gewaltherrschaft in Deutschland 1933-1945 ("Memorial Book – Victims of the Persecution of the Jews under National Socialist Tyranny") and Yad Vashem, of all Jews who either were born in Waldhilbersheim or Heddesheim or lived there for a long time, 50 died under Nazi rule (birthdates in brackets):

- From Waldhilbersheim:
1. Walter Aron (1894)
2. Moritz Grünewald (1886)
3. Hilde Hallgarten née Simon (1895)
4. Erna Marcus née Aron (1893)
5. Berta Schneider née Abraham (1854)
6. Rosa Schneider (1882)
7. Thekla Wolf née Schneider (1887, Rosa's sister)
- From Heddesheim:
1. Frieda (Friedel) Ansbacher née Stern (1896)
2. Max Ansbacher
3. Else Ansbacher
4. Willy Ansbacher
5. Leopold Bähr (1873)
6. Walter Benjamin (1910)
7. Adelheid (Adele) Brunner née Reinstein (1867)
8. Isidor Flörsheim (1870)
9. Ida Grünfeld née Benjamin (1901)
10. Jakob Grünwald (1885)
11. Berthold Halm (1884)
12. Friederike (Frieda) Heilbron née Stern (1870)
13. Erna Kahn née Stern (1899)
14. Moritz Kahn (1885)
15. Ida Kiefer née Wolf (1885)
16. Flora Meyer née Stern (1893)
17. Sally Meyer
18. Betty Moses née Stern (1901)
19. Willy Moses
20. Martha Müller née Benjamin (1895)
21. Dorothe Schneider (1895)
22. Johanna Schneider (1892)
23. Sally Schwab
24. Helene Schwarz née Benjamin (1884)
25. Bertha Stern née Hirschfeld
26. Auguste Stern née Lindauer
27. Emil Stern
28. David Stern (1878)
29. Heinrich Stern (1879)
30. Herbert Stern (1928)
31. Lina Stern née Kahn
32. Lothar Stern (1930)
33. Markus Stern (1866)
34. Moses Stern (1863)
35. Sally Stern (1893)
36. Rosa Strauß née Stern (1875)
37. Ella Wolf (1896)
38. Franz Wolf (1927)
39. Lotte Wolf (1921)
40. Moses Wolf (1855)
41. Selma Wolf née Benjamin (1886)
42. Walter Josef Wolf (1922)
43. Amalie Zack née Schneider (1891)

On a memorial at the community's Jewish cemetery are the names of 23 persons who were murdered in the Holocaust. In the 19th century, the Jewish community held its services in rented rooms until in 1910 a favourably located house was acquired that could be converted into a synagogue. On 16 September 1910, the synagogue was consecrated by the Kreuznach regional rabbi, Dr. Abraham Tawrogi. Also present were the mayors of both Windesheim and Langenlonsheim, along with Heddesheim's and Waldhilbersheim's municipal leaders, clergy and schoolteachers. The Allgemeine Zeitung des Judentums, a Jewish newspaper, reported the following on 7 October 1910:

Kreuznach, 28 September (1910). Last Thursday, the celebratory consecration of the newly built synagogue of the neighbouring municipalities of Heddesheim-Waldhilbersheim took place amidst participation of the citizenry of both villages. Also present were the Catholic and Evangelical pastors as well as all the schoolteachers of both church communities. Moreover, the Amt head and, from the surrounding area, the mayors of Windesheim and Langenlonsheim appeared. Mr. District Chairman von Nasse from Kreuznach, who was kept from attending the celebration by duty, had his wishes of luck to the Jewish community expressed by none other than Rabbi Dr. Tawrogi, who carried out the consecration of this House of God. After Mr. Cantor Marwit from Bingen had presented the liturgical songs with his tuneful voice, Rabbi Dr. Tawrogi lit the everlasting lamp. Thereupon, the magnificently adorned Torah scrolls found their way into the holy shrine to be kept there, whereupon Rabbi Dr. Tawrogi gave the festive speech. In this, the speaker remembered first all those who have contributed to the lovely synagogue's success through their work, thanked all who furthered the work through material support and spoke in an effective way about the purpose of the Jewish House of God. He exhorted the community to the right and assiduous use of this newly consecrated place. After the conclusion of this uplifting celebration, which ended with a prayer for the Kaiser and the Empire, the celebration participants accepted an invitation from the head of the Jewish community, Mr. August Schneider, to a comfortable get-together.

The synagogue itself was a simple aisleless building with round and round-arch windows. Corner lesenes and an ascending frieze were the outward decorative elements. On Kristallnacht (9–10 November 1938), the synagogue was wrecked and plundered. In the process, all the fittings and the ritual objects (two Torah scrolls, the silver menorah, silver beakers and plates, 75 prayer books, curtains and blankets), the pump organ, the stove, lamps and other useful things were stolen or destroyed by the Nazis. In January 1939, the building was sold and thereafter it was used as a storage building or a garage. On the street side, a gate was broken through, and the windows were walled up. Since 1994, the building has been under monumental protection. Its address in Waldhilbersheim is Naheweinstraße 83.

== Religion ==
As at 30 September 2013, there are 2,460 full-time residents in Guldental, and of those, 768 are Evangelical (31.22%), 1,272 are Catholic (51.707%), 1 belongs to the Free Evangelical Church (0.041%), 1 is Greek Orthodox (0.041%), 4 are Lutheran (0.163%), 53 (2.154%) belong to other religious groups and 361 (14.675%) either have no religion or will not reveal their religious affiliation.

== Politics ==
=== Municipal council ===
The council is made up of 20 council members, who were elected by proportional representation at the municipal election held on 7 June 2009, and the honorary mayor as chairman. The municipal election held on 7 June 2009 yielded the following results:

Year	SPD	CDU	Greens	FLG	Total
2009	4	9	2	5	20 seats
2004	4	10	1	5	20 seats

=== Mayor ===
Guldental's mayor is Elke Demele.

=== Coat of arms ===
The municipality's arms might be described thus: Per fess Or a saltire humetty sable and gules three wings argent.

The municipal arms are put together from two coats of arms, the ones formerly borne by the two villages of Heddesheim and Waldhilbersheim before they were merged as part of administrative restructuring in Rhineland-Palatinate. The charge in the upper field is Saint Andrew's Cross, a saltire (X-shaped cross) whose arms do not reach the field's outer edges ("humetty"). This was drawn from Waldhilbersheim's former arms. In the lower field stands a threefold charge, bird's wings. These were drawn from Heddesheim's former arms. The approval for the new, merged municipality of Guldental to bear these arms was granted some time after the actual 1969 merger, in 1971, by the now defunct Regierungsbezirk administration in Koblenz.

=== Town partnerships ===
Guldental fosters partnerships with the following places:

- (Germany) Kronberg im Taunus, Hochtaunuskreis, Hesse

This relationship is not a formalized partnership, amounting to more of a "friendship".

== Culture and sightseeing ==
=== Buildings ===
The following are listed buildings or sites in Rhineland-Palatinate's Directory of Cultural Monuments:

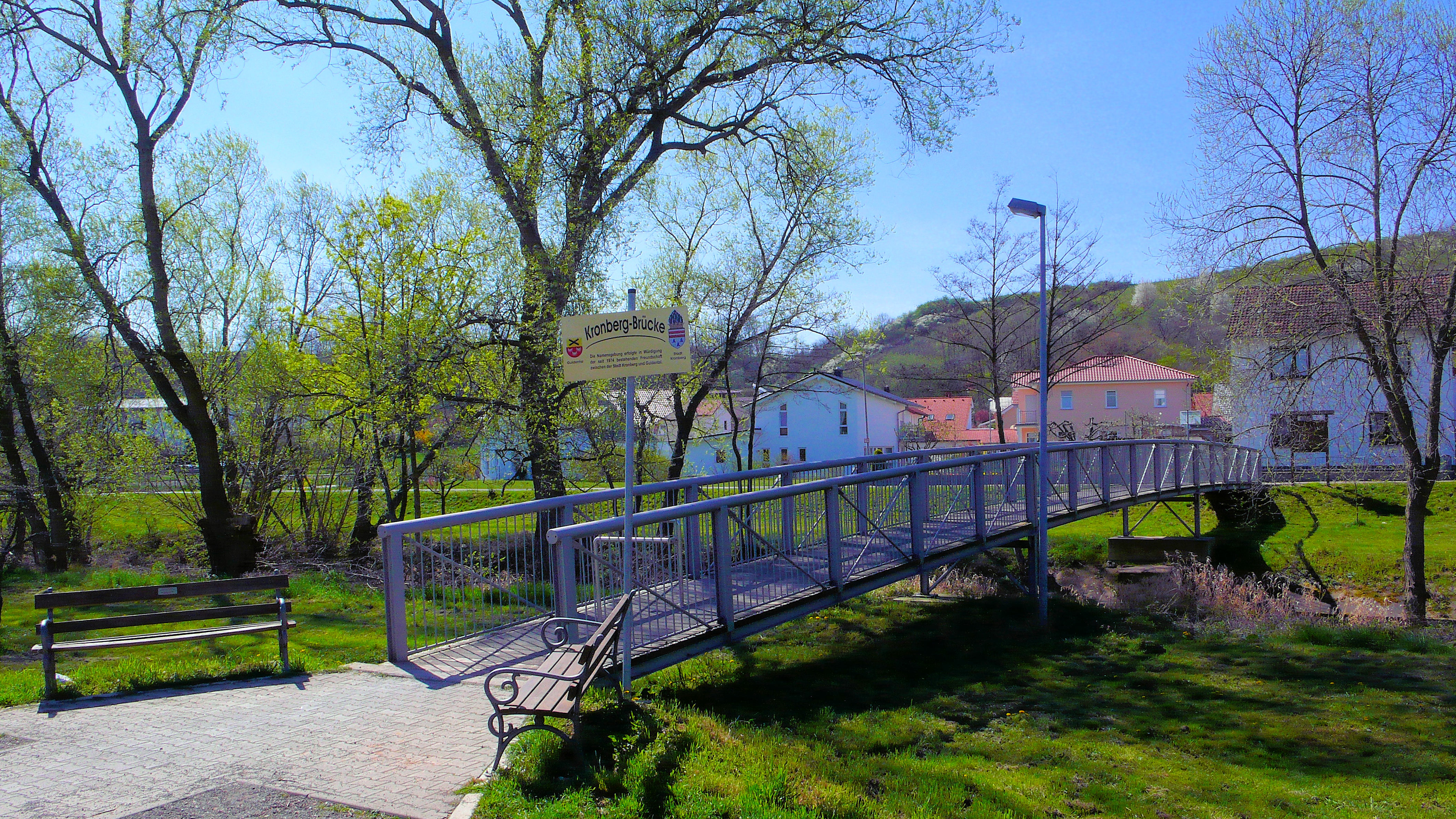
Kronbergbrücke (bridge)

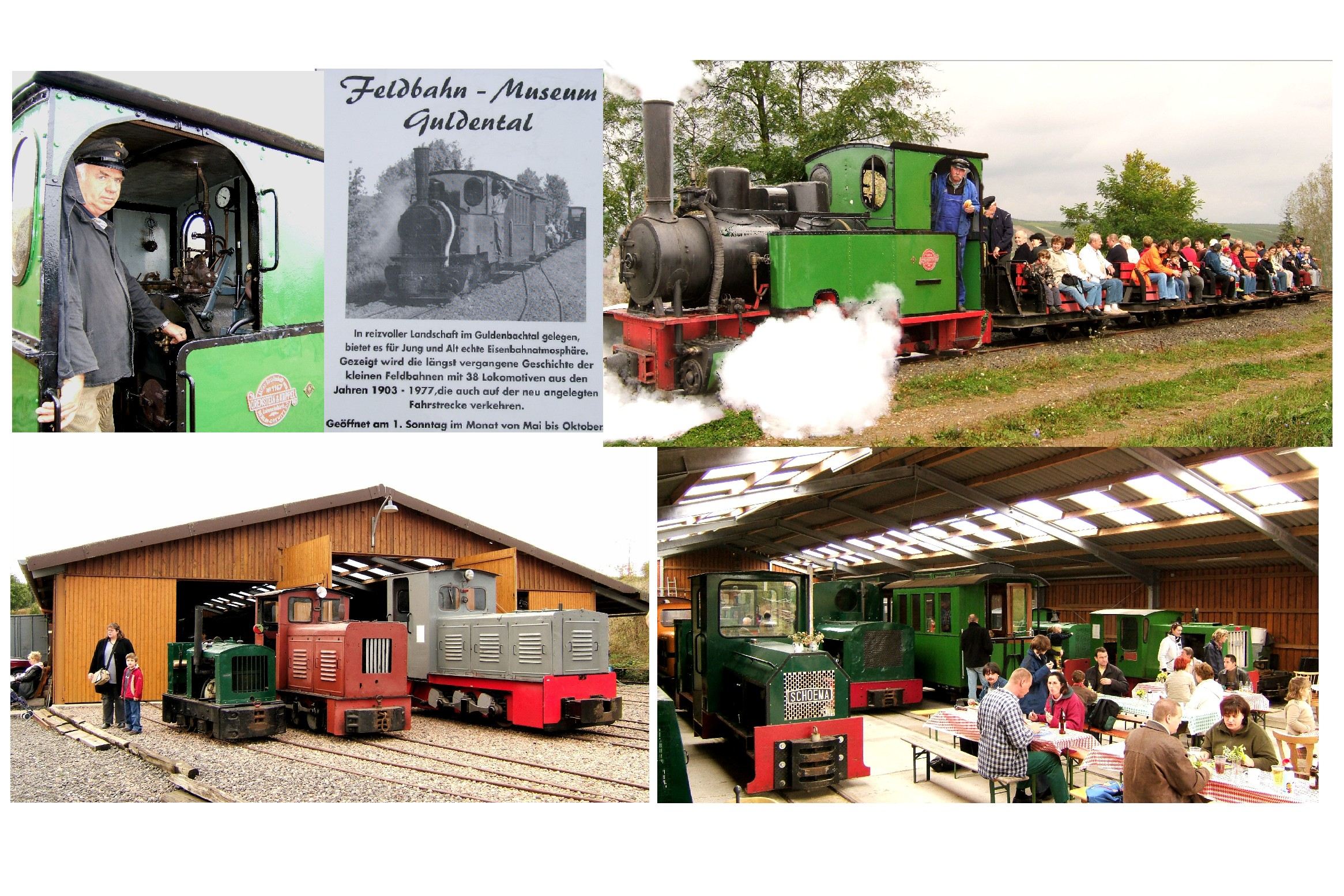
Feldbahn and museum

==== Heddesheim ====
- Evangelical church, Kirchstraße 1 – Romanesque quire tower, 12th or 13th century, Gothic alterations, Baroque spire, 1709; Late Gothic nave, 15th century
- Saint James the Greater's Catholic Parish Church (Pfarrkirche St. Jakobus), Hauptstraße 8 – Late Gothic Revival brick aisleless church, 1894, Cathedral Master builder Max Meckel
- Hauptstraße – Renaissance well, village coat of arms, marked 1584
- Hauptstraße 9 – estate complex along the street; Baroque timber-frame house, partly solid, possibly from the earlier half of the 18th century
- Hauptstraße 14 – former school; Late Classicist brick building, 1895/1896
- Kirchstraße 12 – Baroque timber-frame house, partly solid, earlier half of the 18th century
- Naheweinstraße 48 – house, Late Classicist building with half-hip roof, third fourth of the 19th century
- Pfarriusstraße 12 – Baroque timber-frame house, 18th century (?)
- Breitenfelserhof 4/5/6 – three-part row of small houses with a barn, early 19th century
- Remnants of the Notgotteskapelle (chapel), on der Kreisstraße 48 – cavelike niche in the red sandstone crag, in origin possibly mediaeval

==== Waldhilbersheim ====
- Saint Martin's Catholic Parish Church (Pfarrkirche St. Martin), Große Kirchgasse – aisleless church, 1774/1775, lengthened in 1923; in the churchyard wall gravestones, 18th and 19th centuries; on the quire a Late Baroque Crucifix, marked 1779; three priests' grave crosses, marked 1888, 1920 and 1927; warriors' memorial 1914-1918, Saint Martin relief, 1920s; graveyard cross, sandstone, about 1900; former church portal of the Baroque Catholic church, 1762
- Brückenstraße 1 – Classicist timber-frame house, plastered, earlier half of the 19th century, door leaf marked 1900
- At Brunnenplatz 1 – armorial stone, marked 1577
- Brunnenplatz 5 – former town hall and schoolhouse; Classicist plastered building, about 1850/1860, fountain
- Brunnenplatz 7 – timber-frame dwelling, two-part Baroque timber-frame house, plastered, possibly about 1700; characterizes square's appearance
- Im Baumgarten 2 – estate complex; Baroque timber-frame house, partly solid, 17th century
- Naheweinstraße 83 – former synagogue; brick building with round-arch windows, 1910
- Windesheimer Straße/corner of Flurweg – wayside chapel, 19th century
- Jewish graveyard, in the forest "Auf dem Engelroth" (monumental zone) – area with some 49 gravestones, 1840 to 1937

=== Jewish graveyard ===
The Jewish graveyard in Waldhilbersheim was documented up to about 1934, according to Alemannia Judaica. It has an area of 1 274 m². Also differing from the Directory of Cultural Monuments above is Alemannia Judaica's figure for the number of gravestones, which they give as 42.

=== Clubs ===
Guldental has a great number of clubs. Currently active in the municipality are the following:

- Angelsportverein Guldental e.V. — angling club
- Bauern- und Winzerverband Guldental — farmers' and winegrowers' association
- Chor kreuz und quer — choir
- Dorfladen Guldental w.V. — village shop (legally a "commercial club")
- EPG- Europäische Pfadfinderschaft St.Georg — scouting
- Evangelische Frauenhilfe Guldental — Evangelical women's aid
- Förderverein der Grundschule Guldental e.V. — primary school promotional association
- Freizeitreiter Guldenbachtal e.V. — "leisure riders"
- Fremdenverkehrs- und Verschönerungsverein Guldental — tourism and beautification club
- Freunde der fröhlichen Runde — "friends of the merry tour"
- Guldentaler Frauenstammtisch e.V. — women's Stammtisch
- Karateakademie G-Dojo Guldental e.V. — martial arts
- Karnevalverein Sunneblum 1928 Guldental e.V. — Shrovetide Carnival (Fastnacht) club
- Katholische Frauengemeinschaft "St. Jakobus" Guldental — Catholic women's association
- Katholische Frauengemeinschaft "St. Martin" Guldental — Catholic women's association
- Katholischer Kirchenchor "St. Jakobus" Guldental — Catholic church choir
- Katholischer Kirchenchor "St. Martin" Guldental — Catholic church choir
- Landfrauenverein Guldental — countrywomen's club
- Männergesangverein "Gute Laune" 1927 Guldental e.V. — men's singing club
- Männergesangverein 1923 Guldental e.V. — men's singing club
- Musikverein Guldental e.V. — music club
- Ortsvereinsring Guldental — association of clubs
- Sportgemeinschaft Guldental 07 — sporting association
- Theatergruppe Guldental 2005 e.V. — theatre
- TV 1909 Guldental e.V. — gymnastic club
- VdK Ortsverband Guldental — social advocacy group
- VSC "Spike" Guldental — volleyball club
- Winzerkapelle Guldental e.V. — "winemakers' orchestra"

=== Museums ===
- Feldbahn-Museum Guldental with 36 Feldbahnen and actual running
- Heimat- und Weinbaumuseum — local history and winegrowing museum

== Economy and infrastructure ==
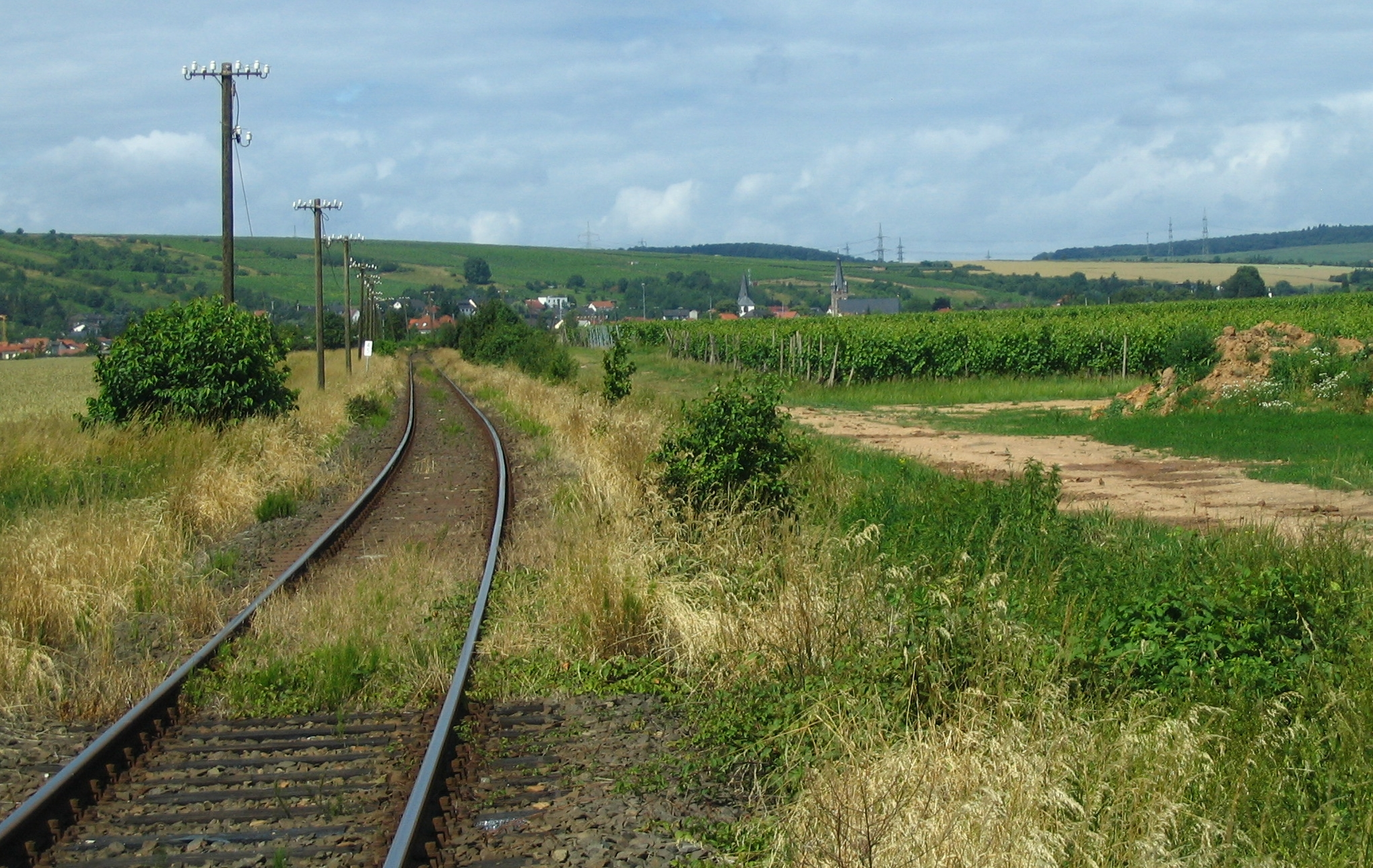
Disused section of the Hunsrückquerbahn near Guldental

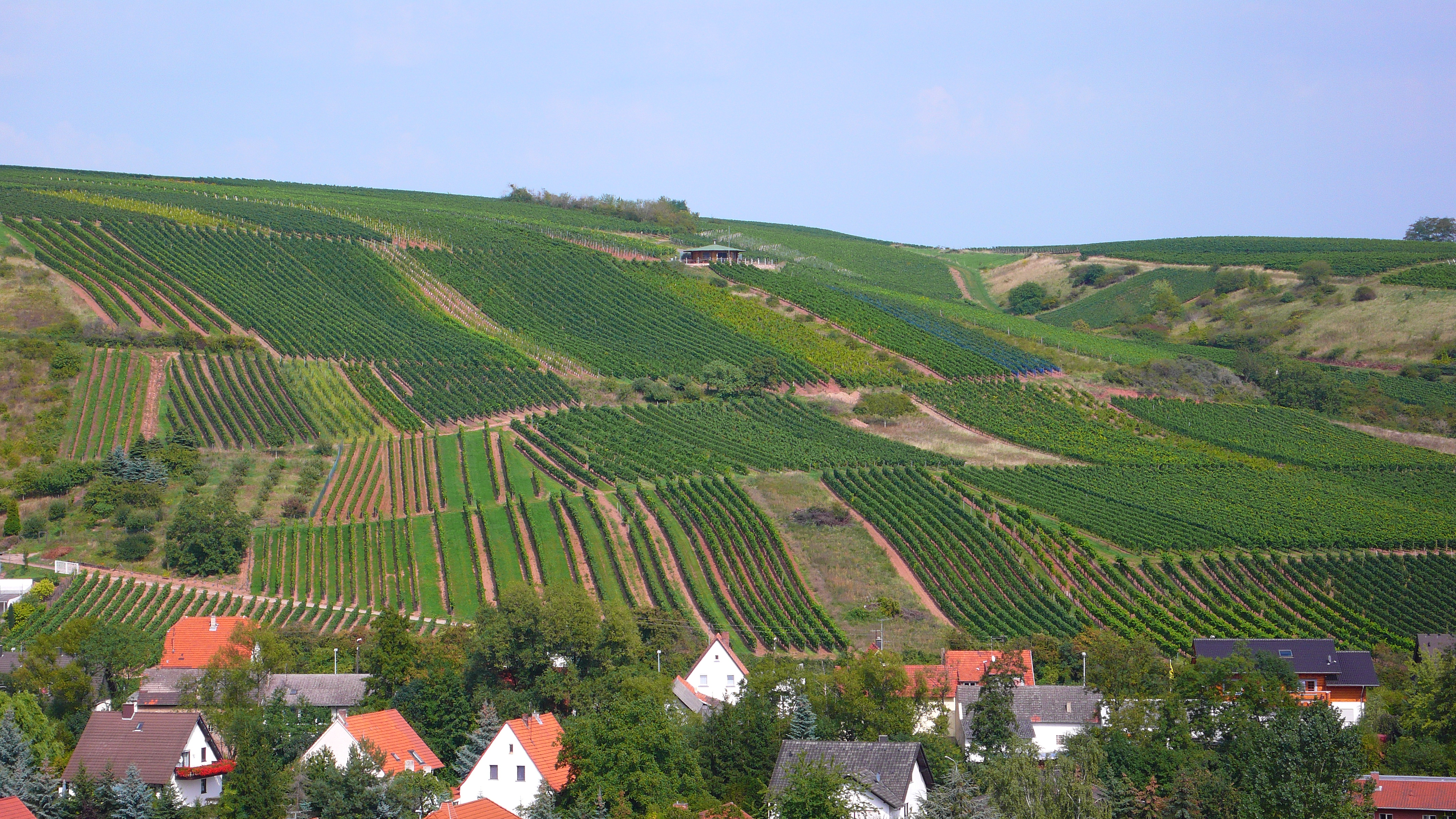
Sonnenberg, Appellation Guldental

=== Transport ===
Guldental lies within the Rhein-Nahe-Nahverkehrsverbund, a local public transport association whose fares therefore apply. Within the municipality is a railway station, Heddesheim (Nahe) on the Cross-Hunsrück Railway (Hunsrückquerbah; Langenlonsheim–Hermeskeil), although currently it has only goods service. The nearest place with passenger rail service is Langenlonsheim on the Alsenz Valley Railway (Alsenztalbahn; Pirmasens–Bingen) lying some 5 km east of Guldental. In Bad Kreuznach, some 8 km south of Guldental, this line crosses the Nahe Valley Railway (Bingen–Saarbrücken). Running daily at least every two hours to Bad Kreuznach is bus route 240, run by Omnibusverkehr Rhein-Nahe. The nearest Autobahn interchange is Waldlaubersheim on the A 61 (Koblenz–Ludwigshafen), some 5 km north of Guldental.

=== Winegrowing ===
Guldental is characterized to a considerable extent by winegrowing, and with 377 ha of vineyard planted it is second only to Bad Kreuznach among the Nahe wine region's biggest winegrowing centres.

== Famous people ==
=== Honorary citizens ===
- Jakob Maurer (former mayor), since 6 January 2002
- Günter Lukas (village chronicler), since 6 January 2002
- Josef Sonnet, since 21 January 2007
- Hubert Zimmermann (choirmaster and organist), since 2012

=== Sons and daughters of the town ===
- Guldental claims Michael von Obentraut (b. 1574; d. 25 October 1625 in Seelze) as one of its own, pointing out that although Castle Stromburg (also called the Fustenburg) near Stromberg may have been the Family Obentraut's seat (and furthermore, may be named in most sources as von Obentraut's birthplace), the family also had holdings in Heddesheim, among them a fortified house where Michael was actually born. Michael von Obentraut, upon whom history has bestowed the honorific Deutscher Michel, is thus said to have brought Heddesheim legendary renown through his exploits in the Thirty Years' War.
- Gustav Pfarrius (b. 31 December 1800; d. 15 August 1884 in Cologne), called the Sänger des Nahetals ("Singer of the Nahe Valley"), came into the world in 1800 in Heddesheim. Besides his many homeland poems he also wrote for the first printed guide book for the Nahe country.

=== Famous people associated with the municipality ===
- Manuel Friedrich (b. 13 September 1979 in Bad Kreuznach) began his football career at SG Guldental 07.
- Johann Lafer (b. 27 September 1957 in Sankt Stefan im Rosental, Styria, Austria), cook
- Julia Klöckner (b. 16 December 1972 in Bad Kreuznach), Member of the Landtag

== Sundry ==
The constituent community of Heddesheim has the same name as another village in the Rhein-Neckar-Kreis in Baden-Württemberg.
