= Dorsheim =

- Municipality
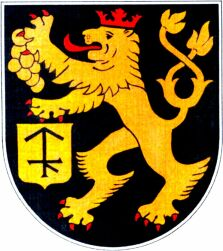
- Coat of arms

- Location of Dorsheim within Bad Kreuznach district
- Interactive map of Dorsheim
- Location within Germany Location within Rhineland-Palatinate
- Coordinates: 49°55′31″N 7°52′24″E
- Country: Germany
- State: Rhineland-Palatinate
- District: Bad Kreuznach
- Municipal assoc.: Langenlonsheim-Stromberg

Government
  - Mayor (2019–24): Marlene Hölz

Area
  - Total: 2.22 km^{2} (0.86 sq mi)
- Elevation: 200 m (660 ft)

Population (2025-12-31)
  - Total: 712
  - Density: 321/km^{2} (831/sq mi)
- Time zone: UTC+01:00 (CET)
  - Summer (DST): UTC+02:00 (CEST)
- Postal codes: 55452
- Dialling codes: 06721
- Vehicle registration: KH
- Website: www.dorsheim.de

Dorsheim is an Ortsgemeinde – a municipality belonging to a Verbandsgemeinde, a kind of collective municipality – in the Bad Kreuznach district in Rhineland-Palatinate, Germany. It belongs to the Verbandsgemeinde Langenlonsheim-Stromberg, whose seat is in Langenlonsheim. Dorsheim is a winegrowing centre.

== Geography ==
=== Location ===
Dorsheim lies on a slope in the Trollbach valley, west of the Nahe, shortly before it empties into the Rhine. The Trollbach valley is a place with extensive vineyards and marked hiking trails, and above it is the Naheblick, a lookout point that affords the visitor an outstanding view of the surrounding geography: Rhenish Hesse’s plains, the Rhine and the uplands beyond, namely the Taunus and the Hunsrück, and also the Donnersberg. To Dorsheim’s south lies Bad Kreuznach, while to the north lies Bingen am Rhein.

=== Neighbouring municipalities ===
Clockwise from the north, Dorsheim’s neighbours are the municipalities of Münster-Sarmsheim, Laubenheim, Langenlonsheim, Waldlaubersheim and Rümmelsheim. All but the first lie in the Bad Kreuznach district. Münster-Sarmsheim lies within the neighbouring Mainz-Bingen district.

== History ==
As archaeological finds show, the lands around what is now Dorsheim were settled quite early on. From the Old Stone Age (100,000–10,000 BC) comes a whole series of various artefacts, which are now in private ownership. Known to be from the New Stone Age (4000–1800 BC) are a great many small hatchets and points, the 12 flint blades from the hoard on the street “Am Rebstock” and Rössen finds (ceramic) from the countryside lying east of Dorsheim. Unearthed from the Hallstatt times that followed have been all kinds of bronze rings from former barrows on the Dorsheim Heath, as well as ceramics from not only the Hallstatt culture but also the Urnfield culture and the Hunsrück-Eifel culture, once again in the countryside lying east of Dorsheim. Roman finds (3rd century AD) have come to light at two sites in the municipality. Various archaeological objects that have been found are now in museums in Bad Kreuznach, Mainz, Bonn and Berlin, although many are in private ownership. It can be said with certainty that Dorsheim was one of the villages founded in Frankish times (500–750), bearing witness to which are finds from Merovingian graves unearthed right near the community centre. On 30 March 1349, Dorsheim had its first documentary mention in a document issued by Count Palatine Ruprecht. For almost 650 years, Dorsheim was a Comital-Palatine or Electoral Palatinate village. It is therefore not surprising that the main charge in the municipality’s coat of arms is the Palatine lion. From 1796 to 1814, the village lay under French rule, first Revolutionary French, and later Napoleonic. Dorsheim lay within the Department of Rhin-et-Moselle. After the Napoleonic Wars and the Congress of Vienna, the region passed to the Kingdom of Prussia in 1815. After the municipality had celebrated its 600th anniversary in 1986 based on the first mention of Dorsheim in documents from 1386, Dorsheim citizen Herrmann Gellweiler delved deeper into the local history and discovered that Dorsheim had already been mentioned in previous documentation from a few decades earlier, in 1349. Too late, the erratum was put to the commemorative plate made for the “600th anniversary” that depicted Count Palatine Ruprecht making a gift of a vineyard in the “Dorsheimer Berg” to his daughter Else. After the new information came to light, Dorsheim was able to mark its 650th anniversary in 1999 based on the now oldest documentation only 13 years after the 600th anniversary.

=== Municipality’s name ===
Nobody can say where the name Dorsheim comes from. Over the ages, the name has appeared in so many different forms, such as Dunrsheim and Donrsheim, that working out a derivation has proved impossible.

=== Population development ===
Dorsheim’s population development since Napoleonic times is shown in the table below. The figures for the years from 1871 to 1987 are drawn from census data:

Year	Inhabitants
1815	219
1835	262
1871	283
1905	359
1939	274

Year	Inhabitants
1950	327
1961	329
1970	381
1987	377
2005	686

== Religion ==
As at 31 August 2013, there are 730 full-time residents in Dorsheim, and of those, 226 are Evangelical (30.959%), 268 are Catholic (36.712%), 15 (2.055%) belong to other religious groups and 221 (30.274%) either have no religion or will not reveal their religious affiliation.

== Politics ==
=== Municipal council ===
The council is made up of 12 council members, who were elected by proportional representation at the municipal election held on 7 June 2009, and the honorary mayor as chairwoman. In the 2004 elections, council members were elected by majority vote. No parties vied for seats in the municipal election, but rather two voters’ groups. The municipal election held on 7 June 2009 yielded the following results:

Group	Share (%)	+/–	Seats	+/–
ULD	67.9	?	8	?
FWAD	32.1	?	4	?

The official figures for the 2004 municipal election rather unhelpfully lumped all voters’ groups’ results together into a single sum. Since they were the only bodies that fielded candidates in Dorsheim, the results simply show an uninformative figure of 100% and a seat count of 12. The two voters’ groups active in Dorsheim are the ULD (Unabhängige Liste Dorsheim e.V.), headed by mayor Marlene Hölz, and the FWAD (Freie Wählergemeinschaft Aktives Dorsheim e.V.), headed by council member Udo Wirth.

=== Mayor ===
Dorsheim’s mayor is Marlene Hölz, and her deputies are Rainer Nies, Rositha Mutter and Harald Schröder.

=== Coat of arms ===
The municipality’s arms might be described thus: Sable a lion rampant with tail fourché Or armed, langued and crowned gules, in his sinister paw a bunch of grapes of the second, in his dexter paw an inescutcheon of the same charged with the Dorsheim court seal symbol of the first.

The main charge is the Palatine Lion, the heraldic device once borne by Electoral Palatinate, which ruled Dorsheim up until French Revolutionary troops occupied the region in the late 18th century. The grapes represent Dorsheim’s winegrowing tradition, and the inescutcheon bears a symbol that once appeared in Dorsheim’s court seal, dating from 1653. The arms have been borne since 1974.

== Culture and sightseeing ==
=== Buildings ===
The following are listed buildings or sites in Rhineland-Palatinate’s Directory of Cultural Monuments:

- Saint Lawrence’s Catholic Church (Kirche St. Laurentius) and Evangelical church, Weinbergstraße – 1923, architect Algesheimer, Rümmelsheim; both parts of the building use the north wall of the former, Classicist building, about 1830 (see also below)
- Binger Straße 9 – plastered timber-frame house of a three-sided estate, early 19th century

==== More about the church ====
Standing in the middle of Dorsheim is the village church, which was originally a pilgrimage church. The church had its first documentary mention in 1481 in the Stromberg taxation register. After the Thirty Years' War, there is no further record of it. The old church ruin became municipal property in 1820. In 1833 and 1834, the municipality used the rubble and stones that were lying there to build a building containing two schoolrooms and a prayer room. The cost was 3,400 Reichsthaler. Since Evangelical fellow villagers had contributed to the funds to cover the building cost, they too were allowed the use of the prayer room. Nevertheless, time and again there was friction between them and the Catholics, leading to a governmental decision to declare a simultaneum at the village church. To this day, a wall down the middle of the nave cleaves it into two naves: one Catholic and the other Evangelical. The church is under monumental protection. Still found in the Catholic section are pews and carvings from the 17th century. The church stands on Weinbergstraße.

==== Municipal hall ====
The Bürgerhaus – the municipal hall – is housed in the building that was once used as the local Catholic school. The schoolroom was on the ground floor, and accommodated all grade levels up to year 8, while upstairs was the teacher’s dwelling. In 1915, the school got electric lighting, and in 1950 it was renovated, although there was no longer any money to pay for a furnace. In 1966, the school was dissolved, whereafter the schoolroom was used for events, singing rehearsals and municipal council meetings. In 1990 and 1991, a big event hall was built onto the old schoolhouse and this is now used for various public and private events. It is built in such a way that the old schoolroom has now become the stage, but this can be walled off with a retractable partition so that it can also be used for municipal council meetings and other meetings held by various boards, as well as such things as choir practice, theatrical productions, preschool play groups and flute instruction. The upper floor, where the teacher once lived, now houses the mayor’s office and rooms for clubs. The Bürgerhaus stands at the corner of Weinbergstraße and Lindenstraße, and indeed is called An den Linden.

=== Natural monuments ===
Several “bizarre” crags stand in the Trollbach valley.

=== Regular events ===
Each year in Dorsheim at the Feast of the Assumption of Mary (15 August), the mixed choir holds the Lindenfest. The kermis (church consecration festival) is always held on the second weekend in August. The event Von Tal zu Tal (“From Dale to Dale”) is a cycling event open to all in the Verbandsgemeinde of Langenlonsheim. It is held on the last Sunday in August. On the third Thursday of each month, a seniors’ coffeehouse (Seniorenkaffee) is held at 1530, with venue and theme announced beforehand.

=== Clubs ===
The following clubs are active in Dorsheim:

- Bauern- und Winzerverband — farmers’ and winegrowers’ association
- Dorsheim Highlanders e.V.
- Förderverein Floriansjünger e.V. — firefighters’ promotional association
- Freiwillige Feuerwehr — volunteer fire brigade
- Gemischter Chor Liederkranz e.V. — mixed choir
- Theatergruppe Schinderhannes e.V. — theatrical group (named after a notorious outlaw)

== Economy and infrastructure ==
=== Winegrowing ===
Dorsheim belongs to the “Nahetal Winegrowing Area” within the Nahe wine region. In business in the village are seven winegrowing operations, and the area of vineyard planted is 71 ha. Some 83% of the wine grown here (as at 2007) is white wine varieties. In 1979, there were still 24 winegrowing operations, and the vineyard area was slightly greater at 80 ha.

=== Public institutions ===
Dorsheim does not have its own daycare, but the centre in neighbouring Laubenheim is intended for children from both villages. Found in Dorsheim itself are a village square with an oversize chess set, a playground, a football pitch and an outdoor basketball court. Paragliding is common at the Naheblick, the local lookout point from the cliffs. The municipal hall (see above) is used for various events.

=== Transport ===
Dorsheim lies right near the Autobahn A 61 and has its own Autobahn interchange. The noise pollution rates an arithmetic mean according to measurements of roughly 63 dB/24 h.
