= Eckenroth =

- Municipality
- Coat of arms

- Location of Eckenroth within Bad Kreuznach district
- Interactive map of Eckenroth
- Location within Germany Location within Rhineland-Palatinate
- Coordinates: 49°55′30″N 7°46′56″E
- Country: Germany
- State: Rhineland-Palatinate
- District: Bad Kreuznach
- Municipal assoc.: Langenlonsheim-Stromberg

Government
  - Mayor (2025–29): Tim Sieper (PdF)

Area
  - Total: 1.08 km^{2} (0.42 sq mi)
- Elevation: 331 m (1,086 ft)

Population (2025-12-31)
  - Total: 226
  - Density: 209/km^{2} (542/sq mi)
- Time zone: UTC+01:00 (CET)
  - Summer (DST): UTC+02:00 (CEST)
- Postal codes: 55444
- Dialling codes: 06724
- Vehicle registration: KH

Eckenroth is an Ortsgemeinde – a municipality belonging to a Verbandsgemeinde, a kind of collective municipality – in the Bad Kreuznach district in Rhineland-Palatinate, Germany. It belongs to the Verbandsgemeinde Langenlonsheim-Stromberg, whose seat is in Langenlonsheim. The population is 225 as of May 2025.

== Geography ==
=== Location ===
Eckenroth lies below Schindeldorf, an outlying centre of Stromberg, on the opposite side of the dale from the Steyerberg. Bingen am Rhein lies roughly 10 km to the east-northeast, while Bad Kreuznach lies some 12 km to the south-southeast.

=== Neighbouring municipalities ===
Clockwise from the north, Eckenroth's neighbours are the town of Stromberg and the municipality of Schweppenhausen. Also lying right nearby, but not bordering on Eckenroth, is the municipality of Schöneberg to the west.

== History ==
Just when Eckenroth, the smallest village in the Verbandsgemeinde, came into being cannot be determined with any accuracy. It is assumed, however, that this happened about the year 900, when it was built on ruins left behind by the Romans after their centuries in the region. In 1156, it was one of the forest villages held by the counts palatine, and in 1190, it said in the directory of fiefs kept by the House of Bolanden that Ogelrode, as the village was then known, was a branch of the parish of Leibersheim (Waldlaubersheim), and that it was there that the villagers had to send their tithes. The parish itself was held by Count Werner of Bolanden as a fief from Count Lon. A half share of the right of patronage and a part of his tithes from the cropfields and vineyards were transferred by Werner of Bolanden in 1282 to the knight Sir Emilrich of Schonenburg as an enfeoffment. Repeatedly, the village's name has changed in spelling. One archaic spelling has already been mentioned, but then there were two – Ockenrait and Oeckenrod – in the Stromberg taxation register.

=== Population development ===
Eckenroth's population development since Napoleonic times is shown in the table below. The figures for the years from 1871 to 1987 are drawn from census data:

Year	Inhabitants
1815	152
1835	188
1871	201
1905	217
1939	184

Year	Inhabitants
1950	189
1961	192
1970	190
1987	217
2005	222

== Religion ==
As at 31 August 2013, there are 234 full-time residents in Eckenroth, and of those, 81 are Evangelical (34.615%), 86 are Catholic (36.752%), 1 is Lutheran (0.427%), 3 (1.282%) belong to other religious groups and 63 (26.923%) either have no religion or will not reveal their religious affiliation.

== Politics ==
=== Municipal council ===
The council is made up of 6 council members, who were elected by majority vote at the municipal election held on 7 June 2009, and the honorary mayor as chairman.

=== Mayor ===
As of June 2025 Eckenroth's mayor is Tim Sieper of the Party of Progress (PdF).

=== Coat of arms ===
The municipality's arms might be described thus: Sable a clearing hoe and a cramp in saltire Or.

The cramp, or crampon – a charge called a Doppelhaken (“double hook”) or Wolfsangel (“wolf hook”) in German – is an ancient market town symbol, and in German heraldry it is also a symbol for forestry. The other charge, the hoe, as a kind of tool for clearing land can be called a Rodhacke in German, thus making it canting for the last syllable in the village's name (both the D in the word for the tool and the last two letters in “Eckenroth” are pronounced [t]). The hoe, however, also stands for the village's traditional winegrowing. The tinctures, sable and Or (black and gold), are those formerly borne by the Electorate of the Palatinate, to which Eckenroth belonged for quite a long time. Municipal council chose the two charges with Eckenroth's traditional industries, forestry and winegrowing, in mind. The municipal banner also bears the municipal arms on a background of two vertical stripes of red and gold.

== Culture and sightseeing ==
=== Buildings ===
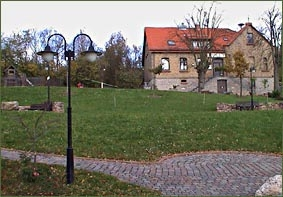
Inn Zur Linde

The following are listed buildings or sites in Rhineland-Palatinate’s Directory of Cultural Monuments:

- Evangelical church, Hauptstraße – Late Baroque aisleless church, marked 1782; tomb, 1887; warriors’ memorial 1914-1918, renovated 1932
- Hauptstraße, graveyard – Family Klein crypt, about 1879
- Near Krämerweg 1 – memorial stone, Gothic Revival, marked 1882
- Schulweg 2 – former school; one-and-a-half-floor Gründerzeit brick building, marked 1892, addition with teacher's dwelling (see also below)

The old 19th-century schoolhouse still stands in the village, but it is no longer used as such, having been converted into an inn, the Gasthaus “Zur Linde” (“Inn at the Limetree”). It has a community hall that can be hired for occasions and events.

=== Regular events ===
The traditional kermis (church consecration festival, locally known as the Kirmesfest) falls on the last Sunday in August and is held on the square before the old school, now an inn called Zur Linde.

== Economy and infrastructure ==
=== Transport ===
Currently, no railway serves Eckenroth or any of its neighbours, although the now disused Hunsrückquerbahn once served neighbouring Schweppenhausen and Stromberg. There is, however, talk of reactivating this railway as a quick transport link for Frankfurt-Hahn Airport, a former NATO military facility, Hahn Air Base, most of whose military functions ceased on 30 September 1993. However, as it stands, the nearest railway is the Nahe Valley Railway (Bingen–Saarbrücken) with stations in Bingen, Münster-Sarmsheim, Laubenheim, Langenlonsheim, Bretzenheim and Bad Kreuznach, all lying roughly to Eckenroth's east. Also running by Eckenroth to the east is the Autobahn A 61. The nearest interchange is in Waldlaubersheim.
