= Langenlonsheim-Stromberg =

Verbandsgemeinde in Rhineland-Palatinate, Germany

- Verbandsgemeinde
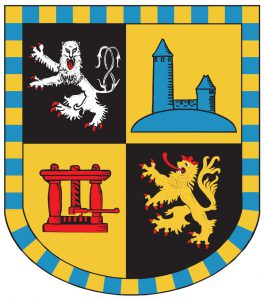
- Coat of arms

- Location of Langenlonsheim-Stromberg within Bad Kreuznach district
- Interactive map of Langenlonsheim-Stromberg
- Location within Germany Location within Rhineland-Palatinate
- Coordinates: 49°54′N 7°54′E
- Country: Germany
- State: Rhineland-Palatinate
- District: Bad Kreuznach
- Seat: Langenlonsheim
- Subdivisions: 17 municipalities

Area
  - Total: 128.98 km^{2} (49.80 sq mi)

Population (2025-12-31)
  - Total: 24,307
  - Density: 188.46/km^{2} (488.10/sq mi)
- Time zone: UTC+01:00 (CET)
  - Summer (DST): UTC+02:00 (CEST)
- Website: www.langenlonsheim-stromberg.de

Langenlonsheim-Stromberg is a Verbandsgemeinde ("collective municipality") in the district of Bad Kreuznach, Rhineland-Palatinate, Germany. The seat of the Verbandsgemeinde is in Langenlonsheim. It was formed on 1 January 2020 by the merger of the former Verbandsgemeinden Langenlonsheim and Stromberg.

The Verbandsgemeinde Langenlonsheim-Stromberg consists of the following Ortsgemeinden ("local municipalities"):

1. Bretzenheim
2. Daxweiler
3. Dörrebach
4. Dorsheim
5. Eckenroth
6. Guldental
7. Langenlonsheim
8. Laubenheim
9. Roth
10. Rümmelsheim
11. Schöneberg
12. Schweppenhausen
13. Seibersbach
14. Stromberg
15. Waldlaubersheim
16. Warmsroth
17. Windesheim
