= Windesheim, Germany =

Windesheim
- Municipality
- Coat of arms

- Location of Windesheim within Bad Kreuznach district
- Interactive map of Windesheim
- Location within Germany Location within Rhineland-Palatinate
- Coordinates: 49°54′21″N 7°48′55″E
- Country: Germany
- State: Rhineland-Palatinate
- District: Bad Kreuznach
- Municipal assoc.: Langenlonsheim-Stromberg

Government
  - Mayor (2019–24): Volker Stern

Area
  - Total: 10.17 km^{2} (3.93 sq mi)
- Elevation: 165 m (541 ft)

Population (2025-12-31)
  - Total: 1,830
  - Density: 180/km^{2} (466/sq mi)
- Time zone: UTC+01:00 (CET)
  - Summer (DST): UTC+02:00 (CEST)
- Postal codes: 55452
- Dialling codes: 06707
- Vehicle registration: KH
- Website: www.windesheim.de

Windesheim is a municipality in the district of Bad Kreuznach in Rhineland-Palatinate, in western Germany.
