= Warmsroth =

- Municipality
- Coat of arms

- Location of Warmsroth within Bad Kreuznach district
- Interactive map of Warmsroth
- Location within Germany Location within Rhineland-Palatinate
- Coordinates: 49°57′22.19″N 7°47′17.59″E
- Country: Germany
- State: Rhineland-Palatinate
- District: Bad Kreuznach
- Municipal assoc.: Langenlonsheim-Stromberg

Government
  - Mayor (2025–29): Sandra Seltmann

Area
  - Total: 5.91 km^{2} (2.28 sq mi)
- Elevation: 328 m (1,076 ft)

Population (2025-12-31)
  - Total: 553
  - Density: 93.6/km^{2} (242/sq mi)
- Time zone: UTC+01:00 (CET)
  - Summer (DST): UTC+02:00 (CEST)
- Postal codes: 55442
- Vehicle registration: KH

Warmsroth is a municipality in the district of Bad Kreuznach in Rhineland-Palatinate, in western Germany.
