= Laubenheim =

- Municipality
- Coat of arms

- Location of Laubenheim within Bad Kreuznach district
- Interactive map of Laubenheim
- Location within Germany Location within Rhineland-Palatinate
- Coordinates: 49°55′13″N 7°53′54″E
- Country: Germany
- State: Rhineland-Palatinate
- District: Bad Kreuznach
- Municipal assoc.: Langenlonsheim-Stromberg

Government
  - Mayor (2019–24): Barbara Sand

Area
  - Total: 3.34 km^{2} (1.29 sq mi)
- Elevation: 110 m (360 ft)

Population (2025-12-31)
  - Total: 826
  - Density: 247/km^{2} (641/sq mi)
- Time zone: UTC+01:00 (CET)
  - Summer (DST): UTC+02:00 (CEST)
- Postal codes: 55452
- Dialling codes: 06704
- Vehicle registration: KH

Laubenheim is an Ortsgemeinde – a municipality belonging to a Verbandsgemeinde, a kind of collective municipality – in the Bad Kreuznach district in Rhineland-Palatinate, Germany. It belongs to the Verbandsgemeinde Langenlonsheim-Stromberg, whose seat is in Langenlonsheim. Laubenheim is a winegrowing village.

== Geography ==
=== Location ===
Laubenheim, a village of some 900 inhabitants, lies between Bingen am Rhein to the north and Bad Kreuznach to the south, right on the Nahe just up from the place where it empties into the Rhine. Laubenheim lies alee of the Hunsrück and has a mild climate, which is favourable to the vineyards that are kept above the village.

=== Neighbouring municipalities ===
Clockwise from the north, Laubenheim's neighbours are the municipality of Münster-Sarmsheim, the town of Bingen am Rhein and the municipalities of Grolsheim (all three of which lie in the neighbouring Mainz-Bingen district), Langenlonsheim and Dorsheim (both of which likewise lie in the Bad Kreuznach district).

=== Constituent communities ===
Also belonging to Laubenheim is the outlying homestead of Laubenheimermühle.

== History ==
There is little doubt but that Laubenheim's beginnings go back to Celtic times. Roman watermains in the “Sandgrube” and many coin, pot, grave and sarcophagus finds from Roman times in the northern half of Laubenheim's municipal area also bear witness to people in the area at that time. It was also the Romans who brought grapevines to the Nahe valley in the 1st century AD. They were surely drawn to the valley's south-facing slopes as a good place to plant vineyards. As far back as the 9th century, a donation document from Charlemagne’s son Louis the Pious (814-843) reports of Laubenheim (829). In the State Archive at Koblenz, and furthermore in the Land Archive at Schloß Gracht (a moated château) near Liblar, a place called Luibenheim crops up often in documents as a winegrowing village, as it does too at the Count of Spree’s archive at Schloß Heltorf near Düsseldorf-Angermund, the so-called Reypoltzkirchensche Archiv. According to these records, the village was an appurtenance of the lordship of Reichenstein, held by the Lords of Hohenfels, lords at Reypoltzkirchen (Reipoltskirchen). In 1410, Duke Stephan of Palatinate-Simmern signed the village of Laubenheim over to his wife as a “proper morning gift”. According to a cadastral map from the time, this did not include a Carthusian monastery that was here then. From this comital-palatine time also comes the municipal coat of arms used today. It began as a court seal that bore the same composition today seen in the arms, and also a circumscription that read “Siegel von Laubenheim an der Nahe 1602” (“Seal of Laubenheim on the Nahe 1602”). The vine hung with three bunches of grapes show that winegrowing was already important to the village even then. In the Thirty Years' War, Laubenheim was often set ablaze by Spanish or Swedish troops. In the 17th century, it suffered greatly under French marauders’ atrocities during the Nine Years' War (known in Germany as the Pfälzischer Erbfolgekrieg, or War of the Palatine Succession). Laubenheim was almost utterly destroyed. Under French Revolutionary – and shortly thereafter Napoleonic – rule, Laubenheim was grouped in 1800 into the Mairie (“Mayoralty”) of Langenlonsheim. This body remained in force even after Napoleon's defeat and the assignment of the lands north of the River Nahe by the Congress of Vienna to the Kingdom of Prussia, although the German word Bürgermeisterei was now used.

=== Jewish history ===
Living in Laubenheim from the 18th to the 20th century were a few Jewish families, who until 1895 belonged to the Waldhilbersheim-Heddesheim Jewish community, and thereafter to the community in Langenlonsheim. In the 19th century, the number of Jewish inhabitants developed as follows: in 1843, there were 5; in 1858, 6; in 1895, 7; in 1925, 6. In 1808, at the time when Jewish families adopted surnames, two community members were named: Leser Mayer, who now became Lazarus Mayer, and his son Isaak Mayer. In the decades that followed, Jewish family names other than Mayer also cropped up in records, such as Kahn and Marx. In 1933, the year when Adolf Hitler and the Nazis seized power, there was still one Jewish family living in Laubenheim, salesman Moritz Kahn, his wife Erna née Stern from Heddesheim and their two sons, Erich (b. 1921) and Fritz (b. 1924). In 1939, they were forced to sell their property below market value. The family moved to Cologne. The elder son, Erich, managed to get out of Germany in time in 1940. Erich joined the American Air Force and fought against the Japanese. The other three, however, were deported 7 December 1941 to the Riga Ghetto. Moritz Kahn was murdered in Riga, Erna Stern Kahn did not survive the concentration camp Stutthof. Fritz (later Fred) Kahn survived several concentration camps and was freed by Soviet troops on 10 March 1945. Fred immigrated to the United States in 1950. According to the Gedenkbuch – Opfer der Verfolgung der Juden unter der nationalsozialistischen Gewaltherrschaft in Deutschland 1933-1945 (“Memorial Book – Victims of the Persecution of the Jews under National Socialist Tyranny”) and Yad Vashem, of all Jews who either were born in Laubenheim or lived there for a long time, 2 died in the time of the Third Reich (birthdates in brackets):

1. Moritz Kahn (1885)
2. Erna Kahn née Stern (1899)

== Religion ==
As at 30 September 2013, there are 803 full-time residents in Laubenheim, and of those, 329 are Evangelical (40.971%), 241 are Catholic (30.012%), 15 (1.868%) belong to other religious groups and 218 (27.148%) either have no religion or will not reveal their religious affiliation.

== Politics ==
=== Municipal council ===
The council is made up of 12 council members, who were elected by proportional representation at the municipal election held on 7 June 2009, and the honorary mayor as chairman. The municipal election held on 7 June 2009 yielded the following results:

Year	SPD	CDU	FBL	Total
2009	–	3	9	12 seats
2004	2	3	7	12 seats

=== Mayor ===
Laubenheim's mayor is Barbara Sand.

=== Coat of arms ===
The municipality's arms might be described thus: Per fess sable a lion passant Or armed, langed and crowned gules, and gules a vine leafed of five and fructed of three of the second.

The charge in the upper field is the Palatine Lion, recalling Laubenheim's history as an Electoral Palatinate landhold. The charge in the lower field, the vine with the grapes, stands for the all-important traditional industry of winegrowing. The composition of these arms appeared as early as 1602 in the village seal.

== Culture and sightseeing ==
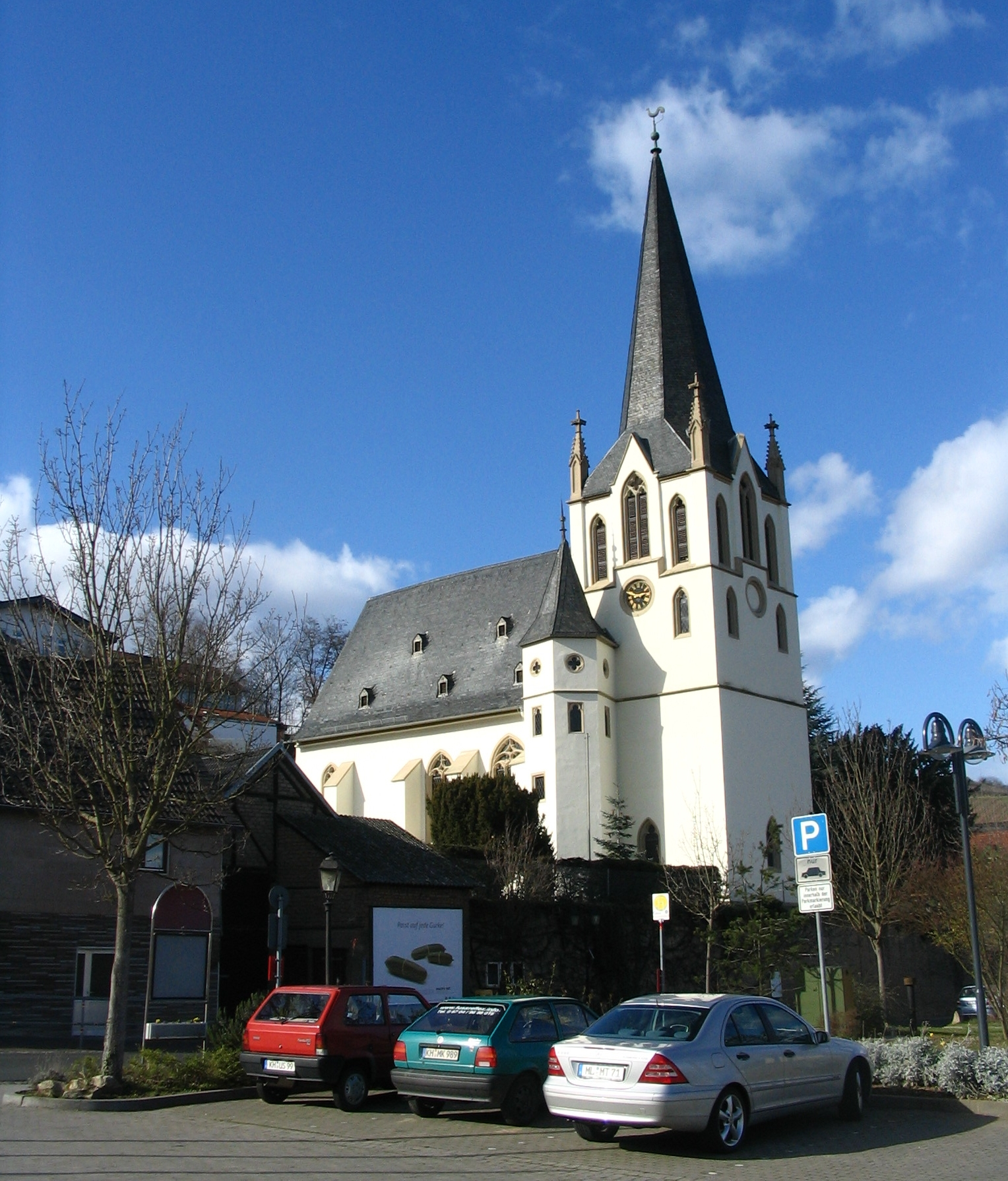
Naheweinstraße 42 – Evangelical parish church

=== Buildings ===
The following are listed buildings or sites in Rhineland-Palatinate’s Directory of Cultural Monuments:

- Evangelical parish church, Naheweinstraße 42 – Late Gothic aisleless church, latter half of the 15th century, quire tower with Gothic Revival upper level, 1864–1866, District Master Builder Conradi, Kreuznach; Evangelical rectory, Heimatstil, 1920s, parish garden, small complex with warriors’ memorials 1870-1871, 1914-1918 and 1939-1945
- Catholic Chapel of the Exaltation of the Holy Cross (Kapelle Kreuzerhöhung), Naheweinstraße 40 – small Late Baroque aisleless church, marked 1781
- Backhausgasse 10 – house with ground-floor stable, earlier half of the 19th century (?)
- At Naheweinstraße 30 – remnant of a Renaissance stairway tower, 16th or 17th century, cellar facilities
- Naheweinstraße 34 – estate complex; Late Baroque timber-frame house, plastered, possibly from the latter half of the 18th century
- Naheweinstraße 38 – former monastery estate, hook-shaped complex; Baroque timber-frame house, barrel-vaulted cellar marked 1560 (?), 1610 (?) and 1665; barn, partly timber-frame
- Naheweinstraße 46 – house, one-floor house with ground-floor stable, partly timber-frame, 18th century or early 19th century
- Laubenheimer Mühle (mill), on the Nahe, Bundesstraße 48, north of the village – Late Classicist house with knee wall, about 1850/1860; Gründerzeit clinker brick building with knee wall, late 19th century; Gründerzeit side building; storehouse, 1920s

== Economy and infrastructure ==
=== Winegrowing ===
Laubenheim belongs to the Nahetal Winegrowing Area within the Nahe wine region. Thirteen winegrowing operations are active within the municipality, and the area planted with vineyards is 114 ha. Some 76% of the wine grown here is white wine varieties (as at 2007). In 1979, there were still 30 active winegrowing operations, but the area planted with vineyards was quite a bit smaller at only 80 ha.

=== Transport ===
Laubenheim has its own railway station on the Nahe Valley Railway (Bingen–Saarbrücken), which affords it hourly connections in both directions, with Bingen (Rhein) Hauptbahnhof and Bad Kreuznach station both lying less than 10 km away. The Autobahnen A 60 and A 61 (Koblenz–Ludwigshafen) are also both nearby, although far enough away for traffic noise not to be a problem. Running through the village is Bundesstraße 48.
