= Münster-Sarmsheim =

- Municipality
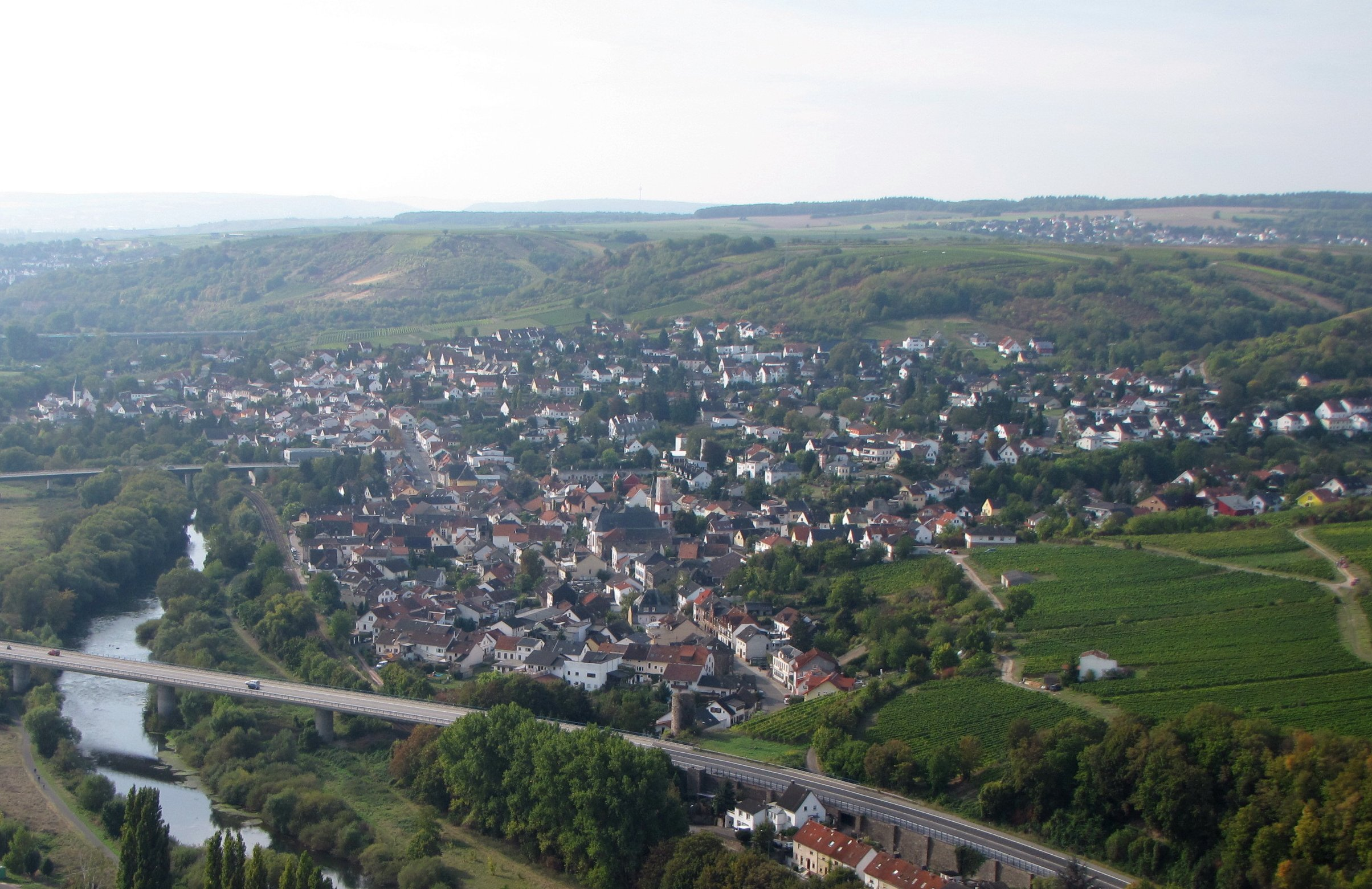

- Coat of arms

- Location of Münster-Sarmsheim within Mainz-Bingen district
- Interactive map of Münster-Sarmsheim
- Location within Germany Location within Rhineland-Palatinate
- Coordinates: 49°56′41″N 7°53′52″E
- Country: Germany
- State: Rhineland-Palatinate
- District: Mainz-Bingen
- Municipal assoc.: Rhein-Nahe

Government
  - Mayor (2019–24): Jürgen Dietz

Area
  - Total: 6.92 km^{2} (2.67 sq mi)
- Elevation: 92 m (302 ft)

Population (2025-12-31)
  - Total: 2,973
  - Density: 430/km^{2} (1,110/sq mi)
- Time zone: UTC+01:00 (CET)
  - Summer (DST): UTC+02:00 (CEST)
- Postal codes: 55424
- Dialling codes: 06721
- Vehicle registration: MZ
- Website: www.nahetor.com

Münster-Sarmsheim (German pronunciation: [ˈmʏnstɐ ˈzaʁmshaɪm]) is an Ortsgemeinde – a municipality belonging to a Verbandsgemeinde, a kind of collective municipality – in the Mainz-Bingen district in Rhineland-Palatinate, Germany.

== Geography ==
=== Location ===
Münster-Sarmsheim lies between Bingen and Bad Kreuznach, on the river Nahe some two kilometres upstream from where it empties into the Rhine. The winegrowing centre belongs to the Verbandsgemeinde of Rhein-Nahe, whose seat is in Bingen am Rhein, although that town is not within its bounds.

== Politics ==
=== Municipal council ===
The council is made up of 21 council members, counting the part-time mayor, with seats apportioned thus:

	SPD	CDU	Grüne	FWG	Total
2004	5	8	1	6	20 seats

(as at municipal election held on 13 June 2004)

=== Coat of arms ===
The municipality's arms might be described thus: Per fess, Or a minster with central block and wings on each side, each of the three with a gabled roof, each wing with a flanking buttress, and each roof ensigned with a cross, the one on the central block further ensigned with the head of an abbot's staff sinister sable, all windows, two in the central block and one each in the wings, and the door in the central block of the field, and gules two arrows in saltire of the first surmounted palewise by a bunch of grapes slipped vert, the grapes three, four, three, two and one.

== Culture and sightseeing ==
=== Buildings ===
- “Stumpfer Turm” (“Blunt Tower”) castle ruin from 1493
- Old Town Hall from 1520
- Saint Peter's and Saint Paul's Catholic Parish Church from 1189
- Evangelical church from 1810
- Saint Alban's Catholic Church from 1445
- Old Tollhouse from 1710
- Timber-frame house at Saarstraße 20 from 1517
- Kruger-Rumpf Winery (founded in 1708)

=== Natural monuments ===
The Trollbachtal Nature Conservation Area harbours cliff formations from 285,000,000 years ago.

=== Festivals ===
- Once a year, the kermis (church consecration festival, locally known as the Kerb) takes place in Münster-Sarmsheim. On the first weekend in August, there is celebrating, dancing and drinking. Against the backdrop of good music and Münster-Sarmsheim's local Nahe wine, the festival is each year a magnet for young and old. Traditionally, the Kerb begins on the Friday with services at Saint Peter's and Saint Paul's Church and the mayor's keg-tapping. The Kerb ends Monday evening.

== Economy and infrastructure ==
=== Vineyards ===
- Kapellenberg, Pittersberg, Dautenpflänzer, Rheinberg

=== Transport ===
- Running right through the municipality is Bundesstraße 48, which links Bad Kreuznach and Bingen am Rhein.
- Autobahn A 61 can be reached after a 3 km drive at the Bingen-Mitte interchange.

=== Education ===
Münster-Sarmsheim has two kindergartens and its own primary school.

== Famous people ==
=== Honorary citizens ===
- Prof. Theo Fischer
- Dr. Friedrich Werner
