= Schweppenhausen =

- Municipality
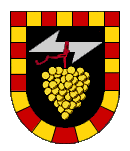
- Coat of arms

- Location of Schweppenhausen within Bad Kreuznach district
- Interactive map of Schweppenhausen
- Location within Germany Location within Rhineland-Palatinate
- Coordinates: 49°55′42″N 7°48′08″E
- Country: Germany
- State: Rhineland-Palatinate
- District: Bad Kreuznach
- Municipal assoc.: Langenlonsheim-Stromberg

Government
  - Mayor (2019–24): vacant (provisionally: Michael Heep, deputy mayor)

Area
  - Total: 3.05 km^{2} (1.18 sq mi)
- Elevation: 195 m (640 ft)

Population (2025-12-31)
  - Total: 895
  - Density: 293/km^{2} (760/sq mi)
- Time zone: UTC+01:00 (CET)
  - Summer (DST): UTC+02:00 (CEST)
- Postal codes: 55444
- Dialling codes: 06724
- Vehicle registration: KH
- Website: www.schweppenhausen.de

Schweppenhausen is a municipality in the district of Bad Kreuznach in Rhineland-Palatinate, in western Germany.
