= Waldlaubersheim =

- Municipality
- Coat of arms

- Location of Waldlaubersheim within Bad Kreuznach district
- Interactive map of Waldlaubersheim
- Location within Germany Location within Rhineland-Palatinate
- Coordinates: 49°55′50″N 7°49′58″E
- Country: Germany
- State: Rhineland-Palatinate
- District: Bad Kreuznach
- Municipal assoc.: Langenlonsheim-Stromberg

Government
  - Mayor (2019–24): Torsten Strauß

Area
  - Total: 8.05 km^{2} (3.11 sq mi)
- Elevation: 208 m (682 ft)

Population (2025-12-31)
  - Total: 902
  - Density: 112/km^{2} (290/sq mi)
- Time zone: UTC+01:00 (CET)
  - Summer (DST): UTC+02:00 (CEST)
- Postal codes: 55444
- Dialling codes: 06707
- Vehicle registration: KH
- Website: www.waldlaubersheim.de

Waldlaubersheim is a municipality in the district of Bad Kreuznach in Rhineland-Palatinate, in western Germany. As of the 2020 census it had a total population of 801. Waldlaubersheim's postal code is 55444.

== Geography and climate ==
Waldlaubersheim is located at (49.930556°, 7.832778°). It is located in the Hunsrück area. The Elevation is approximately 250 meters above sea level, which is much higher than either Bad Kreuznach or Mainz, due to its location at the southern end of the Hunsrück geological mountain range. The average temperature is 9 °C.

== Demographics ==
The Census of 2020 reported that Waldlaubersheim had a population of 801. The population density was 99,5 people per square kilometer. The sexual makeup of Waldlaubersheim was 405 (50,6%) women and 396 men (49,4%). The national makeup was 750 (93,6%) Germans and 51 (6,4%) Foreigners.

The census found 131 people (16,4%) under the age of 20, 106 people (13,2%) aged 20 to 34, 175 people (21.8%) aged 35 to 49, 200 people (25,0%) aged 50 to 64, and 198 people (23,6%) who were 65 years of age or older.

== Economy ==
Waldlaubersheim's economy is based on warehouse services. The town is frequently used as a stop for food and fuel by drivers on Bundesautobahn 61 between the Netherlands and Switzerland. It is the last town for those traveling on L236 north to Stromberg (Hunsrück) or south to Bad Kreuznach.

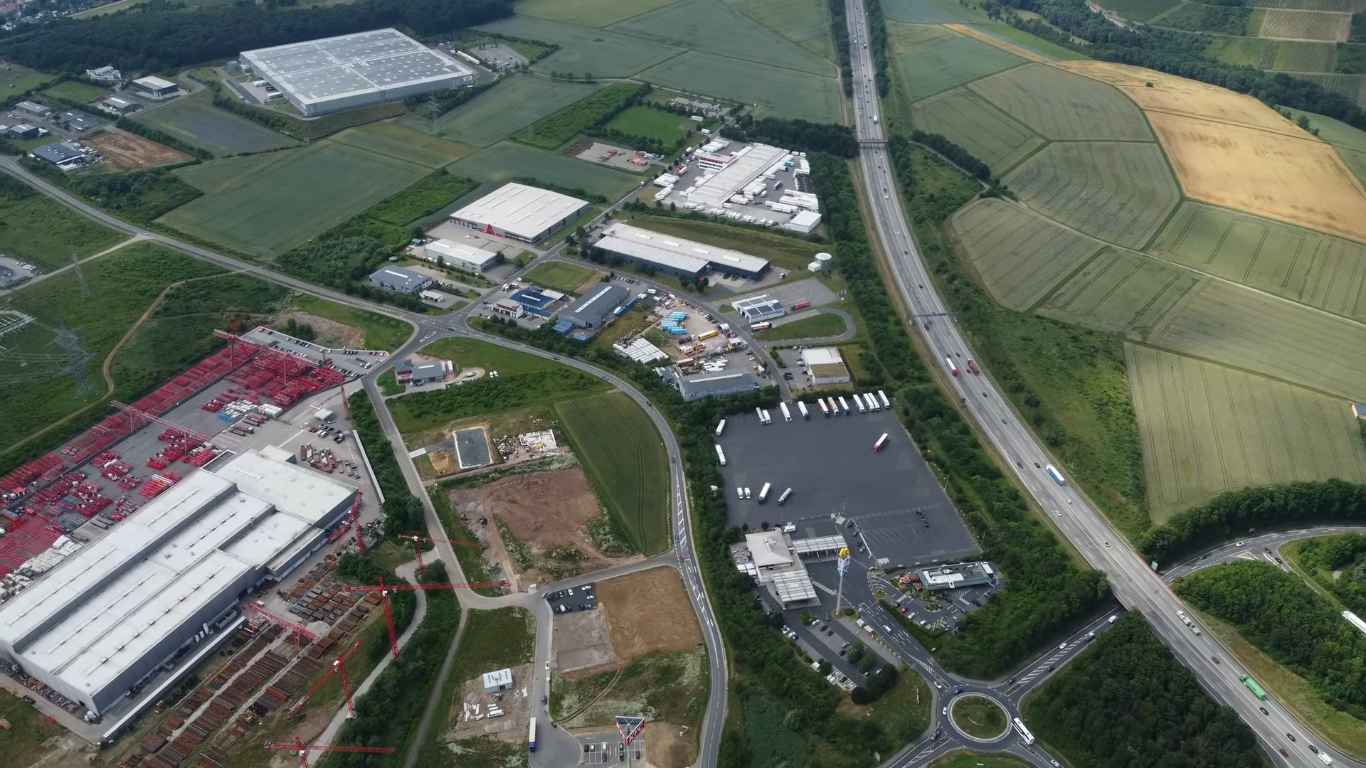
The industrial zone of Waldlaubersheim next to A61
