= Stromberg (Hunsrück) =

- Town
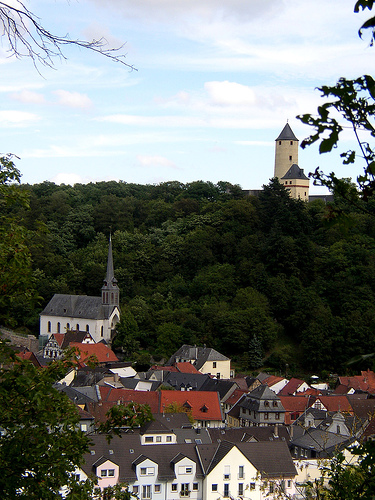

- Coat of arms

- Location of Stromberg within Bad Kreuznach district
- Interactive map of Stromberg
- Location within Germany Location within Rhineland-Palatinate
- Coordinates: 49°56′49″N 7°46′46″E
- Country: Germany
- State: Rhineland-Palatinate
- District: Bad Kreuznach
- Municipal assoc.: Langenlonsheim-Stromberg

Government
  - Mayor (2019–24): Claus-Werner Dapper

Area
  - Total: 9.02 km^{2} (3.48 sq mi)
- Elevation: 220 m (720 ft)

Population (2025-12-31)
  - Total: 3,500
  - Density: 390/km^{2} (1,000/sq mi)
- Time zone: UTC+01:00 (CET)
  - Summer (DST): UTC+02:00 (CEST)
- Postal codes: 55442
- Dialling codes: 06724
- Vehicle registration: KH
- Website: www.stadt-stromberg.de

Stromberg (German pronunciation: [ˈʃtʁoːmˌbɛʁk]) is a town in the district of Bad Kreuznach, in Rhineland-Palatinate, Germany. It is situated on the eastern edge of the Hunsrück, approximately 10 km west of Bingen.

Stromberg was the seat of the former Verbandsgemeinde ("collective municipality") Stromberg.
