= Braunweiler =

- Municipality
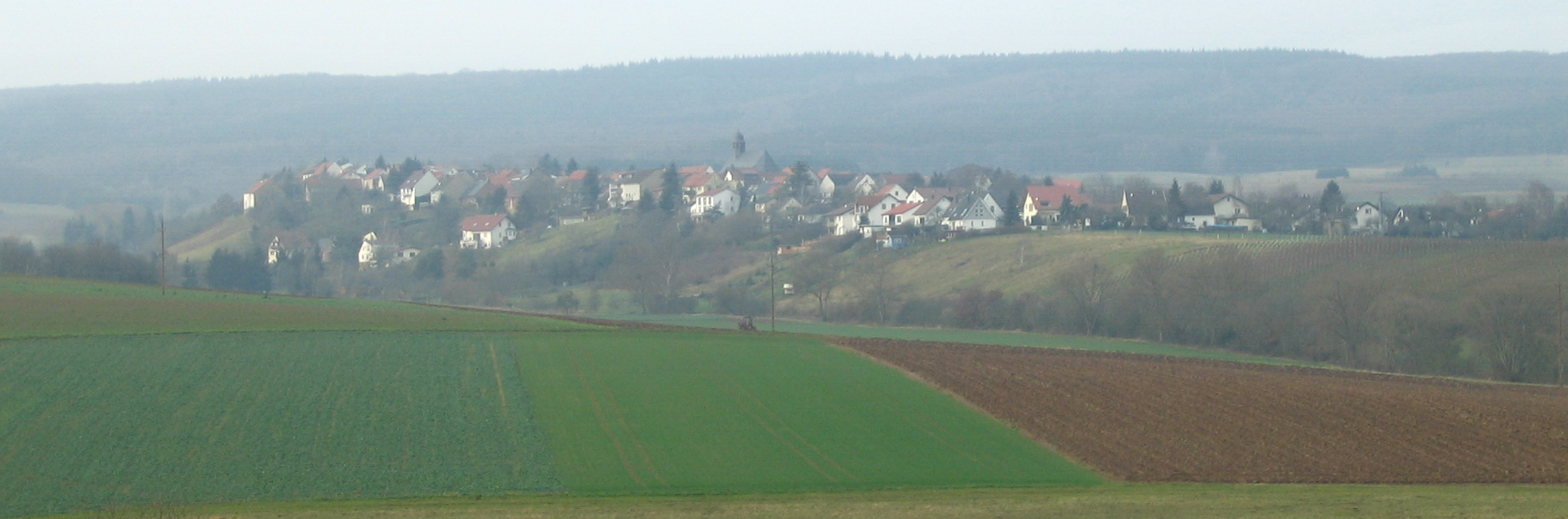

- Coat of arms

- Location of Braunweiler within Bad Kreuznach district
- Interactive map of Braunweiler
- Location within Germany Location within Rhineland-Palatinate
- Coordinates: 49°52′0″N 7°44′42″E
- Country: Germany
- State: Rhineland-Palatinate
- District: Bad Kreuznach
- Municipal assoc.: Rüdesheim

Government
  - Mayor (2019–24): Karlheinz Gellweiler

Area
  - Total: 4.68 km^{2} (1.81 sq mi)
- Elevation: 257 m (843 ft)

Population (2025-12-31)
  - Total: 621
  - Density: 133/km^{2} (344/sq mi)
- Time zone: UTC+01:00 (CET)
  - Summer (DST): UTC+02:00 (CEST)
- Postal codes: 55595
- Dialling codes: 06706
- Vehicle registration: KH
- Website: www.braunweiler.de

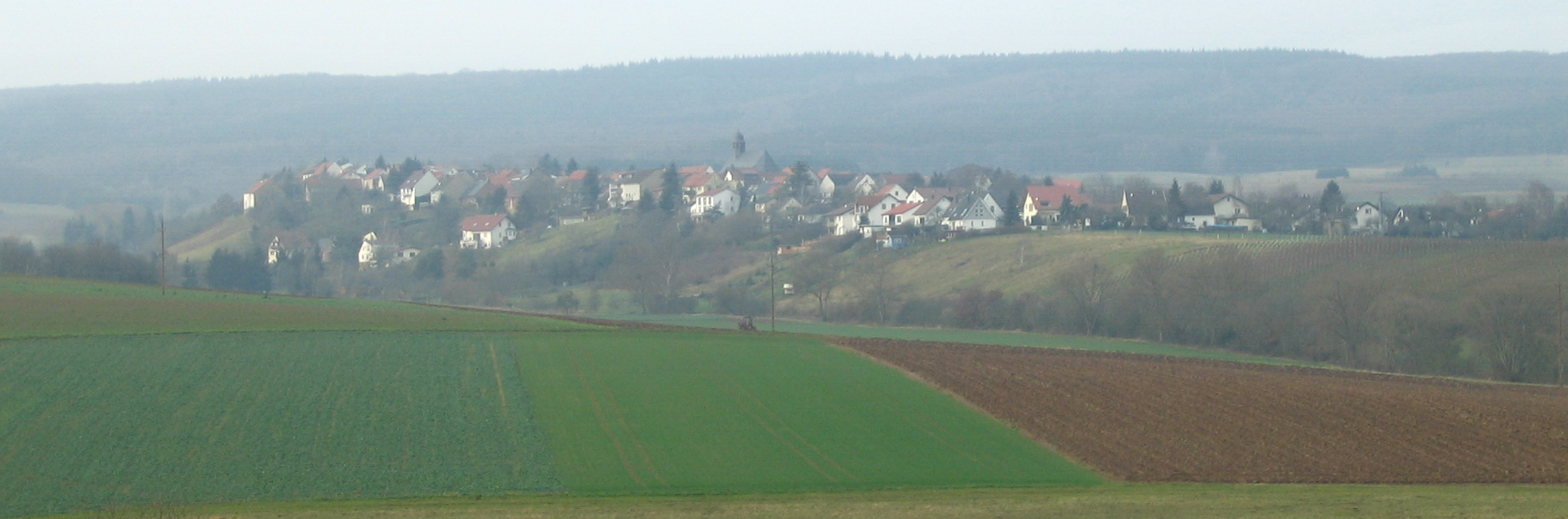
Braunweiler seen from the southeast, in the background the Gauchswald

Braunweiler is an Ortsgemeinde – a municipality belonging to a Verbandsgemeinde, a kind of collective municipality – in the Bad Kreuznach district in Rhineland-Palatinate, Germany. It belongs to the Verbandsgemeinde of Rüdesheim, whose seat is in the municipality of Rüdesheim an der Nahe. Braunweiler is a winegrowing village.

== Geography ==
=== Location ===
Braunweiler lies in the Naheland – the land lining both sides of the Nahe – right at the edge of the Gauchswald (forest) and therefore also the Hunsrück. It sits on a spur overlooking its vineyards. Braunweiler's elevation is 275 m above sea level and the municipal area measures 4.68 km^{2}.

=== Neighbouring municipalities ===
Clockwise from the north, Braunweiler's neighbours are the municipality of Wallhausen, the municipality of Sommerloch, the municipality of Sankt Katharinen, the municipality of Mandel, the municipality of Sponheim and the municipality of Argenschwang. However, of these places, only Sommerloch and Sankt Katharinen are linked to Braunweiler by road (Kreisstraße 51 in both cases).

=== Constituent communities ===
Also belonging to Braunweiler is the outlying homestead of Haus Bock.

== History ==
The earliest settlement at what is now Braunweiler is believed to go back to the 9th century, when the village was made a settled island within the forest by land clearing. The reason for this had not so much to do with cropraising and the clearing of ever further patches of wooded land as it did, above all else, with the settlers’ wish to use the forest that was available to them with its typical Soonwald glades. No later than 1100, the Counts of Sponheim held sovereignty and several times transferred to their house monastery, called Sponheim Abbey, properties and incomes in Braunweiler. From the time of its founding, the village was at first only called Wilre (Weiler in Modern High German, meaning simply “hamlet”). After the Sankt Katharinen monastery was founded in 1217, having been endowed by Godefried, Provost of Kreuznach, Udo, Archpriest at Mannendal (Mandel), Friedrich, State Dean of Hilbersheim and their fellow citizens (the members of the state chapter), Braunweiler was distinguished from other hamlets by having the tag by Sante Katherinen added to its name. In 1271, Braunweiler had its first documentary mention by Johannes Tritemus in Sponheim Abbey's chronicle. At that time, the abbey's abbot, Petrus von Sponheim, bought landholds for 200 Marks to build an estate with their help. Tritemus's writings, however, make it clear enough that this endeavour soon fell through and the lands that the abbot had bought were then yielded up to the villagers, against payment of certain fees.

During the centuries that followed, there was an ownership history that is still rather murky, but it can be assumed that the villagers went through a whole series of feudal lords, lessees and landowners to whom they had to, among other things, pay part of their harvest. As late as the 15th century, Braunweiler still belonged to the free villages in the Kreuznach state court region. Thus, in times of need, the villagers could flee to the town (now called Bad Kreuznach), where they would be safer behind the town's fortifications. This privilege, however, came at a price, for Braunweiler was also expected to contribute to the town's defence and, for example, send a Schöffe (roughly “lay jurist”) to the court. Braunweiler's municipal area was therefore part of the Kreuznach Imperial Estate in the Early Middle Ages.

Politically, Braunweiler belonged from 1350 to 1798 to the Amt, and later Oberamt, of Kreuznach. But for a few censuses, there is no information about Braunweiler's population figures. In 1580, though, it is known that the village had 153 inhabitants, living in 34 houses.

The building of the first chapel is believed to have come about sometime around the year 1475, but the chapel itself was only first mentioned in 1565. At this time, it was consecrated to Saint Quirinus, who was said to be the patron saint of livestock, particularly horses.

In 1604, the town hall burnt down; it is unknown when it had been built. It also served several purposes after it was built anew in 1700, housing not only the mayor's dwelling and “office” but also a sewing parlour, a bakery and a jail. The bakery was not a bakery as such so much as a communal bakehouse. There was no baker working there, only an oven to which anyone could bring his or her own dough to be baked into bread.

It has been passed down in the local lore that the village once lay at the foot of the Gauchsberg at a spring (or perhaps a well). After the great fire in 1604, according to this lore, it was not only the town hall that burnt down, but rather the whole village. Then, when the village rose from the ashes, it did so not at its old site, but up in the heights, at its current site. This would, however, seem to be rather unlikely, for there is no clue left of this former state of affairs. On the other hand, similarities can be seen in Mandel and Sankt Katharinen, which both lie right at wells. In Braunweiler, though, the old well lies somewhat outside the village, and at best had to be reached by the Brunnenweg (“well path”), which is still there today.

A Weistum (cognate with English wisdom, this was a legal pronouncement issued by men learned in law in the Middle Ages and early modern times) has been handed down from 1654. It is a so-called Hof- und Gutsweistum, that is to say, one that dealt with estates and property. The Lords of Koppenstein owned, according to this, cropfields, meadows and vineyards within Braunweiler's limits totalling an area of 40 Morgen, which were let to villagers. Against this, the Junker of Koppenstein was entitled to 8 Malter of corn (likely meaning either wheat or rye), 5 Malter of oats and 12 albus.

As early as 1665, history mentions the village's first schoolteacher, who came from the Amt of Stolberg in Saxony. Although at that time some of the schoolchildren were Catholic, Andreas Simon was presumably Protestant. Later, a Catholic school was established, and it was first mentioned in 1693. The schoolteacher there was also the church organist and sometimes even the church bookkeeper and court clerk. The pay kept rising over time and began with the schoolteacher's being allowed to use the disputed church meadow intensively, which in 1697 was converted into a cash payment of 5 Rhenish guilders. Soon, though, the landholders raised the salary from 5 to 20 guilders and 10 Malter of corn besides. In February 1689, the first Catholic church services in a long time were held, Braunweiler's mostly Protestant populace having gained a few Catholic families. In 1745, mainly through the Mannheim-based Electorate of the Palatinate government's efforts, a Catholic parish was once again established in Braunweiler.

Agriculture was the villagers’ economic mainstay until the mid 20th century. In the 19th century, there were few other jobs available, although there were some merchants, cobblers, carpenters and even locksmiths who could be named.

=== Municipality’s name ===
From the 15th century to the 18th, Braunweiler was also called Praumweiler or Prümweiler. The placename researcher H. Kaufmann derives this from the name Bruno, which is rather unlikely, as this name hearkens back to the Early Middle Ages, whereas Braunweiler arose only in the land-clearing phase of the High Middle Ages. It could also be that the name comes from Prüm Abbey (not the better known one) in Roxheim, but that only existed up to the 9th century.

== Religion ==
Braunweiler's first chapel, believed to have been built about 1475, was consecrated to Saint Quirinus. Braunweiler is traditionally of Catholic character. Saint Joseph’s Church (Kirche St. Josef) was until not too many years ago the parish church of the parish of Braunweiler-Sankt Katharinen. After a merger with the parish of St. Laurentius-Wallhausen, it is today part of the parish of Spabrücken. Braunweiler belongs to the Evangelical parish of Mandel. As at 31 August 2013, there are 621 fulltime residents in Braunweiler, and of those, 116 are Evangelical (18.68%), 429 are Catholic (69.082%), 3 (0.483%) belong to other religious groups and 73 (11.755%) either have no religion or will not reveal their religious affiliation.

== Politics ==
=== Municipal council ===
The council is made up of 12 council members, who were elected by proportional representation at the municipal election held on 7 June 2009, and the honorary mayor as chairman.

The municipal election held on 7 June 2009 yielded the following results:

Year	SPD	CDU	FWG	Total
2009	3	4	5	12 seats
2004	2	7	3	12 seats

=== Mayor ===
Braunweiler's mayor is Karlheinz Gellweiler.

=== Coat of arms ===
The municipality's arms might be described thus: Gules on ground vert Saint Quirinus of Neuss in full armour, in his sinister hand a lance with a forked pennon, in his dexter a shield, all argent.

The arms have been borne since 5 October 1950.

== Culture and sightseeing ==
=== Buildings ===
The following are listed buildings or sites in Rhineland-Palatinate’s Directory of Cultural Monuments:

- Saint Joseph’s Catholic Parish Church (Pfarrkirche St. Josef), Heegwaldstraße – Late Baroque aisleless church, 1758, expansion 1955/1956, architect Peter Thull, sacristy addition 1857; warriors’ memorial 1870/1871, Gothicized, last fourth of the 19th century
- Dietersgasse 10 – Baroque timber-frame house of an estate complex along the street, possibly from the late 18th century; barn marked 1806
- Heegwaldstraße – warriors’ memorial 1870/1871, Gothicized, last fourth of the 19th century
- Heegwaldstraße 2 – Catholic rectory; timber-frame, plastered, Classicist, about 1850
- Heegwaldstraße 4 – post-Baroque timber-frame house, marked 1806
- Heegwaldstraße 5 – three-sided estate, mid 19th century: timber-frame house, double barn, shed with stable lads’ parlour, marked 1893
- Heegwaldstraße 27 – building with half-hip roof, timber-frame, early 19th century, marked 1920
- Near Heegwaldstraße 38 – Late Baroque wayside cross, marked 1789
- Hermannsgasse 4 – Baroque timber-frame house of an estate complex, marked 1808, essentially possibly from the 18th century
- Near Lindenstraße 2 – Late Baroque wayside cross, sandstone, marked 1771
- Near Spabrücker Weg 5 – Late Baroque wayside cross, sandstone, marked 1792
- Wayside cross, Wallhäuser Weg – cast-iron corpus, about 1900

=== Regular events ===
Rooted fast in Braunweiler's village life are many festivals and events that are rich in tradition. There are, for example, the music club's Waldfest (“forest festival”), the Feuerwehrfest (“fire brigade festival”), the kermis (church consecration festival, staged by the Braunweiler sport club), regular dinners of the Bolivienkreis (an aid group for Bolivia) and concerts given by the church choir and the music club. Braunweiler is also well known for its Corpus Christi procession, with many visitors coming from throughout the region just to experience this ecclesiastical event. There is also a regular village festival (Dorffest) with many exhibitors.

== Economy and infrastructure ==
=== Public institutions ===
- Kindergarten Braunweiler
- Heegwaldhaus: This building housed until the 1960s the village school. After that was dissolved, the building was converted into a village community centre, and it is thus today used as an event venue.
- Public playground
- Public ballgame ground with goals, a goal wall and a playground ropeway
- Heegwald-Platz with a small skatepark
- Various signposted hiking trails through the neighbouring Gauchswald
- Nature teaching path leading through the municipal area

=== Transport ===
Running to Braunweiler's south is Bundesstraße 41. The nearest Autobahnen are the A 61 to the northeast and the A 60 to the east. The road links to the neighbouring villages of Sankt Katharinen and Sommerloch are by Kreisstraßen (K 51 in both cases).

== Famous people ==
=== Sons and daughters of the town ===
- Leo Schwarz (b. 9 October 1931), former auxiliary bishop in Trier (until 2006)
