= Rüdesheim =

Rüdesheim is the name of the following places:

- Rüdesheim am Rhein in Hesse, Germany
  - Rüdesheim (Rhein) station, in Rüdesheim am Rhein
- Rüdesheim an der Nahe in Rhineland-Palatinate, Germany
- Rüdesheim (Verbandsgemeinde), a collective municipality in Bad Kreuznach, Rhineland-Palatinate, Germany
