= Mandel, Germany =

Mandel
- Municipality
- Coat of arms

- Location of Mandel within Bad Kreuznach district
- Interactive map of Mandel
- Location within Germany Location within Rhineland-Palatinate
- Coordinates: 49°51′20″N 7°46′20″E
- Country: Germany
- State: Rhineland-Palatinate
- District: Bad Kreuznach
- Municipal assoc.: Rüdesheim

Government
  - Mayor (2019–24): Peter Schulz

Area
  - Total: 6.33 km^{2} (2.44 sq mi)
- Elevation: 200 m (660 ft)

Population (2025-12-31)
  - Total: 911
  - Density: 144/km^{2} (373/sq mi)
- Time zone: UTC+01:00 (CET)
  - Summer (DST): UTC+02:00 (CEST)
- Postal codes: 55595
- Dialling codes: 0671
- Vehicle registration: KH
- Website: www.gemeinde-mandel.de

Mandel (German pronunciation: [ˈmandl̩]) is an Ortsgemeinde – a municipality belonging to a Verbandsgemeinde, a kind of collective municipality – in the Bad Kreuznach district in Rhineland-Palatinate, Germany. It belongs to the Verbandsgemeinde of Rüdesheim, whose seat is in the municipality of Rüdesheim an der Nahe. Mandel is a winegrowing village.

== Geography ==
=== Location ===
Mandel lies in the Naheland (the region either side of the River Nahe), south of the Hunsrück, some 5 km west of Bad Kreuznach amidst vineyards, meadows and woodland. Mandel sits at an elevation of 200 m above sea level and its municipal area measures 6.33 km^{2}.

=== Neighbouring municipalities ===
Clockwise from the north, Mandel's neighbours are the municipalities of Sankt Katharinen, Roxheim, Rüdesheim an der Nahe, Weinsheim, Sponheim and Braunweiler, all of which likewise lie within the Bad Kreuznach district.

== History ==
Mandel (then Mannendal) had its first documentary mention in 962 as an Imperial fief of Saint Maximin's Abbey in Trier in a document purportedly from Emperor Otto I (although this document is known to be falsified). Given the job of Vögte over the holdings in Mandel by the abbey were the Waldgraves and Rhinegraves. A church, which may well have been consecrated to Saint Maximin himself, had its first documentary mention in 1140 in a document from Pope Innocent II. In 1196, independently from the abbey's holdings, Imperial ministerialis Werner von Bolanden was enfeoffed by the Empire with the jurisdiction, the right to appoint clergy and the tithes. Subsequently, split off from the jurisdiction, the right to appoint clergy and the tithes passed to the heirs of the Bolandens, the Counts of Sponheim-Dannenfels and the Princes of Nassau-Saarbrücken. The Counts of Sponheim enfeoffed their ministeriales with their share of the right to appoint clergy. In 1370, the fiefholder was the knight Sir Heinrich Zymar von Sponheim, called von Mannendal. Landholds in Mandel were also among the holdings made over to Sponheim Abbey in 1101 when the Counts endowed that institution. In 1439, the lordship over Mandel cropped up as a holding of the Family von Dalberg, who were the Chamberlains of Worms. They transferred the village as a fief to the Family von Koppenstein. This family had arisen from a liaison between Count Johann II of Sponheim-Kreuznach and the daughter of one of his Burgmannen, one not legitimized by wedlock. This Sponheim sideline named itself after their castle in the Hunsrück, Koppenstein. They were in the service of various territorial lords over time, as knights, clergy or officials, even Obermarschall in the Duchy of Saxe-Meiningen, and even under the Counts of Sponheim themselves. The Family von Koppenstein was split into two lines, the Kirchberg Line, which was Catholic, and the Mandel Line, which was Lutheran. The village of Mandel, however, was owned by all family members. The administrative seat – and at times also the residential seat – was the palace built by the von Koppensteins. Held in fief by the von Koppensteins from Nassau-Saarbrücken was a half share of the tithe. About the middle of the 16th century, the Lutheran faith was introduced into the village. Several members of the Family von Koppenstein were buried in the old church. Bearing witness to this is Michael von Koppenstein's still preserved tomb slab from the 16th century. When Jacob Adolf von Koppenstein died in 1768 with no heir, the Family von Koppenstein was no more, and the village of Mandel passed back to the overlords, the Barons of Dalberg. In 1786, they sold the village, along with all the rights, to Imperial Count Carl-August von Bretzenheim. In 1801, with the Treaty of Lunéville, Mandel too, along with all the German lands on the Rhine's left bank, was incorporated into the French state after having been overrun by French Revolutionary troops. From 1815, Mandel was part of the Kingdom of Prussia, and the Prussian Bürgermeisterei ("Mayoralty") of Mandel-Hüffelsheim was named after it and one other village. Mandel remained Prussian right through Imperial, Weimar and Nazi times, only becoming part of the then newly founded state of Rhineland-Palatinate after the Second World War.

=== Jewish history ===
Mandel had a Jewish community until sometime between 1938 and 1943. It arose sometime in the 18th century. The number of Jewish inhabitants in the 19th century developed as follows: in 1808, there were 25; in 1858, 75; in 1895, 48. From the mid-19th century, the Jews living in Weinsheim also belonged to the Jewish community in Mandel. In the way of institutions, there were a synagogue (see Synagogue below), a Jewish school (this was housed at the Jewish schoolhouse on Rathausstraße), a mikveh and a graveyard (see Jewish graveyard below). To provide for the community's religious needs, a schoolteacher was hired, who also busied himself as the hazzan and the shochet. An advertisement for homemade kosher wine for Passover in the magazine Der Israelit on 17 March 1884 referred to the community's "strictly religious religion teacher" whose name was Mr. Eppstein. One member of Mandel's Jewish community fell in the First World War, Leo Michel (b. 17 October 1895 in Mandel, d. 27 August 1918). Also, a former Mandel resident who had moved to Kreuznach by 1914, Isaak Rauner (b. 30 April 1884 in Mandel, d. 9 April 1918) fell in the Great War. In 1925, the Jewish community still had 22 members. In 1932, the community's head was Emil Marx. In 1933, there were still 23 Jews living in Mandel.

After 1933, the year when Adolf Hitler and the Nazis seized power, though, some of the Jews moved away or even emigrated in the face of the boycotting of their businesses, the progressive stripping of their rights and repression, all brought about by the Nazis. On Kristallnacht (9–10 November 1938), the synagogue's interior was utterly destroyed by Brownshirt thugs (their commander is believed to have been from Roxheim), and perhaps worse, several Jewish homes were also invaded and demolished (the Families Marx, Michel and Salomon). Some locals also eagerly participated in the destruction of Jewish property that night. Particularly bad was the effect on community head Marx's family (a butcher's shop on Hauptstraße). Marx had been left lame in the right arm in the First World War (for which he had been awarded the Iron Cross, First Class); Mr. and Mrs. Marx had four children, two of whom (Karola and Ernst) were deaf and dumb. The Family Marx's home and business were utterly destroyed. The parents and the two deaf children were later murdered after being deported. According to the Gedenkbuch – Opfer der Verfolgung der Juden unter der nationalsozialistischen Gewaltherrschaft in Deutschland 1933-1945 ("Memorial Book – Victims of the Persecution of the Jews under National Socialist Tyranny") and Yad Vashem, of all Jews who either were born in Mandel or lived there for a long time, 17 died in the time of the Third Reich (birthdates in brackets):

1. Rosalie Dreifuss née Rauner (1895)
2. Moses Hirsch (1882)
3. Otto Hirsch (1877)
4. Simon Hirsch (1875)
5. Jenny Kaufmann née Hirsch (1880)
6. Bertha Löb née Hirsch (1862)
7. Rosa Löb née Hirsch (1857)
8. Emil Marx (1876)
9. Ernst Marx (1913)
10. Eugenie Marx née Marx (1881)
11. Karola Marx (1910)
12. Rosa Marx (1873)
13. Berta Rauner (1886)
14. Moritz Salomon (1876)
15. Luise Schloss née Bärmann (1883)
16. Salomon Schloss (1878)
17. Siegbert Schloss

== Religion ==
As at 31 October 2013, there are 896 full-time residents in Mandel, and of those, 500 are Evangelical (55.804%), 242 are Catholic (27.009%), 10 (1.116%) belong to other religious groups and 144 (16.071%) either have no religion or will not reveal their religious affiliation.

== Politics ==
=== Municipal council ===
The council is made up of 12 council members, who were elected by personalized proportional representation at the municipal election held on 7 June 2009, and the honorary mayor as chairwoman. The 12 seats are shared between two voters' groups.

=== Mayor ===
Mandel's mayor is Peter Schulz.

=== Coat of arms ===
The German blazon reads: Das Wappen zeigt ein Schachbrett mit blau-gelben Feldern, oben rechts ein goldenes Freifeld, darin ein Rabe auf zwei grünen Mandeln.

The municipality's arms might in English heraldic language be described thus: Chequy azure and Or a quarter of the second in which a raven standing on two almonds, all proper.

At the wine festival in Mandel, the village was decked out with the municipal flag, giving rise to the question of what the coat of arms meant. The arms, approved by the now defunct Regierungsbezirk administration in 1959, is derived from the village's former court seal. This court seal in turn had its roots in the arms once borne by the former court lords of Mandel, the Lords of Koppenstein. Koppe is apparently a word that means "raven", which led the Koppensteins to adopt the raven as their heraldic device. In their arms, the raven charge stood on two mountaintops, but in Mandel's former court seal, these were changed to two almonds, almost certainly to serve as a canting charge, for Mandel also happens to be the German word for "almond". Since the Koppensteins had sprung from an illegitimate connection with the Counts of Sponheim, they also bore the Sponheims' blue and gold "chequy" pattern in their arms. The Koppensteins' arms are also part of those borne by the Verbandsgemeinde of Rüdesheim. This stems from the old Mairie ("Mayoralty") of Mandel, a body that existed under Revolutionary and Napoleonic French rule, later the Bürgermeisterei (also "Mayoralty") of Mandel under Prussian rule, which, as a union of Mandel and Hüffelsheim formed the basis of what later became the Verbandsgemeinde.

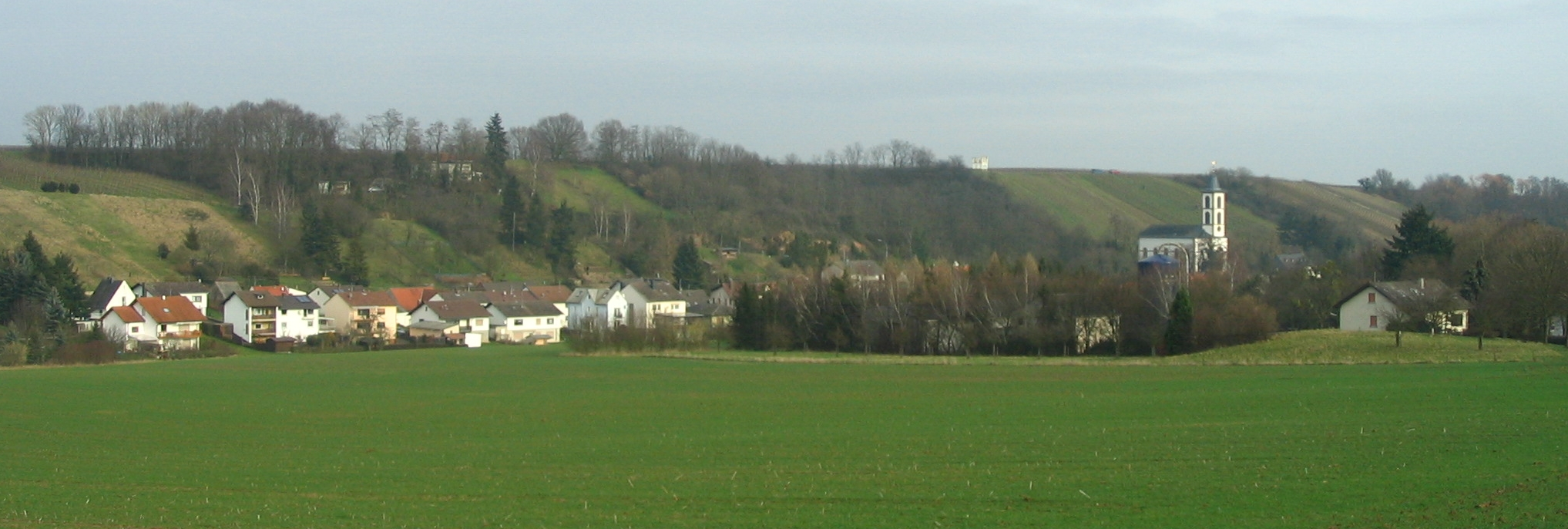
Panorama of Mandel

== Culture and sightseeing ==
=== Buildings ===
The following are listed buildings or sites in Rhineland-Palatinate's Directory of Cultural Monuments:

- Evangelical church, Schloßstraße 16 – Late Classicist aisleless church, 1829/1830, District Building Inspector Ludwig Behr, Bad Kreuznach
- Saint Anthony's Catholic Church (Kirche St. Antonius), Kreuznacher Straße 39 – Romanesquified brick building, 1897, architect Lambert von Fisenne, after fire in 1948 reconstruction
- Alte Rathausstraße 4 – timber-frame house, plastered, marked 1594
- Alte Rathausstraße 17 – former syrup factory; estate complex, 19th century; three-floor building with half-hip roof, marked 1815, essentially possibly older
- Alte Rathausstraße 25 – Baroque timber-frame house, partly solid, about 1700
- Schloßstraße 5 – estate complex; Baroque building with half-hip roof, timber framing plastered, mid-18th century; cast-iron pump well
- Schloßstraße 14 – Evangelical rectory; Early Classicist building with hip roof, 1789–1791, Building Inspector Schweitzer, Kirchheimbolanden; Baroque barn
- Schloßstraße 18 – former castle (Schloss) of the Knights of Koppenstein; Renaissance building with stairway tower, marked 1624, ringwall remnants with shell towers; armorial stone 1722
- Sponheimer Straße 1 – estate complex; Baroque building with half-hip roof, timber-frame, partly solid, marked 1746
- Sponheimer Straße 7 – estate complex; Baroque timber-frame house, partly solid, 18th century, timber-frame barn, partly solid, gateway complex marked 1775
- Sponheimer Straße 20, 22 – Catholic and Evangelical schoolhouse; cube-shaped buildings with tent roofs, mid-19th century
- At Zur alten Trift 1 – inscription tablet, wooden, marked 1730
- Jewish Graveyard (monumental zone) – two-part complex with some 40 gravestones from the 19th and early 20th centuries as well as three gravestones from about 1930
- signpost, on Kreisstraße 50 – sandstone obelisk, 19th century
- Vineyard house, Schlossberg – Gründerzeit brick building, belvedere, possibly from the late 19th century
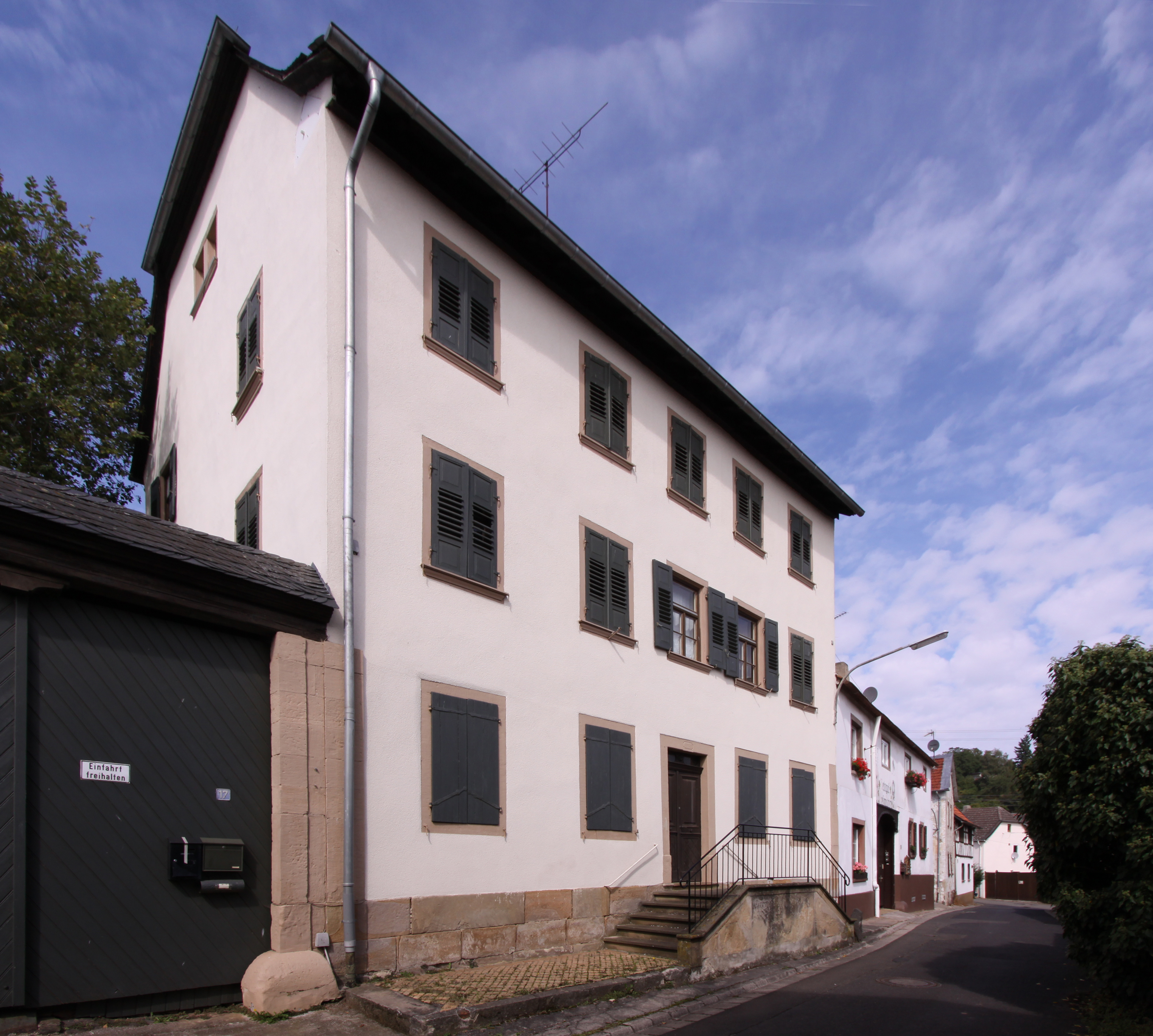
Alte Rathausstraße 17 – former syrup factory

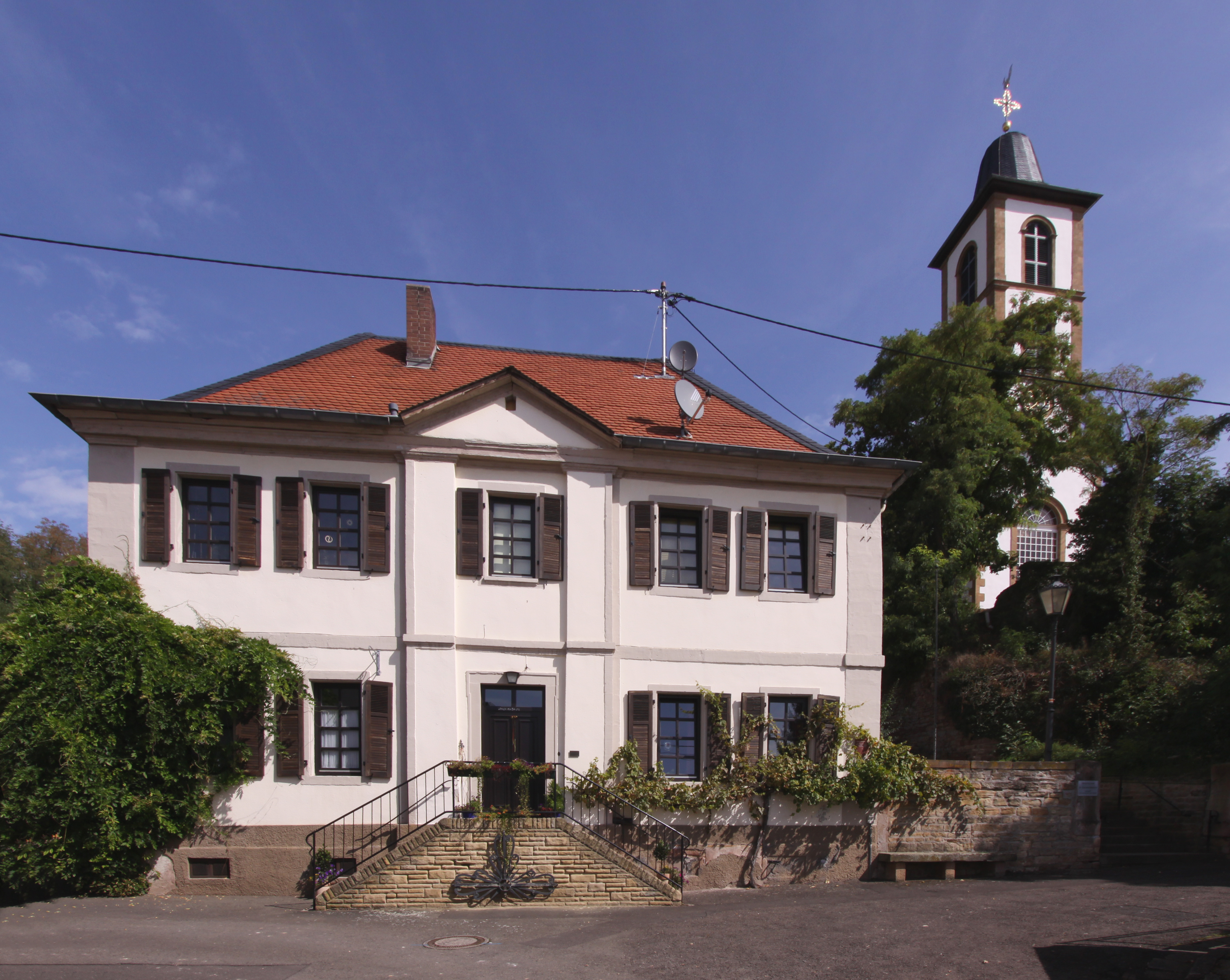
Schloßstraße 14 und 16 – Evangelical rectory and church

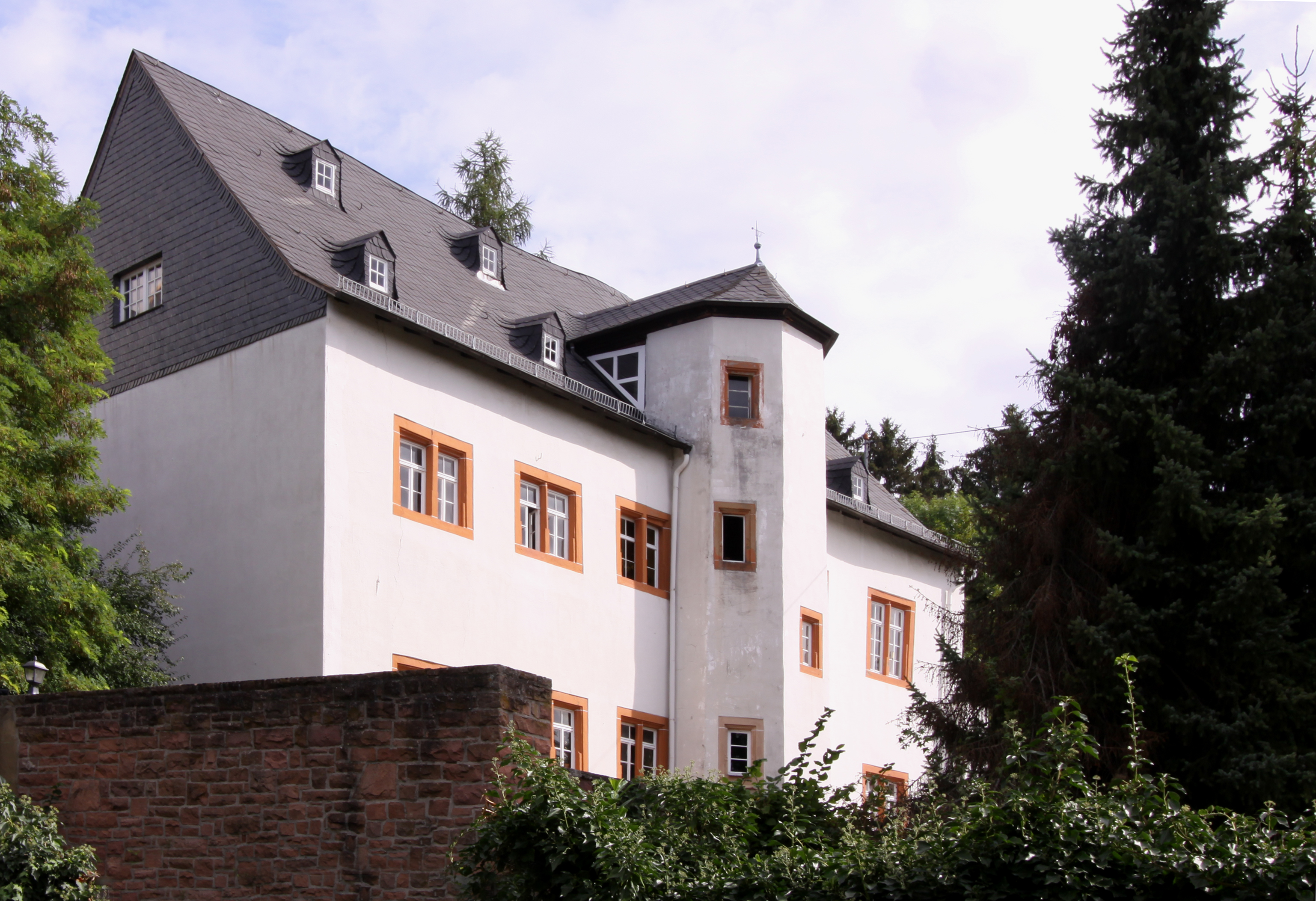
Schloßstraße 18 – former castle of the Knights of Koppenstein

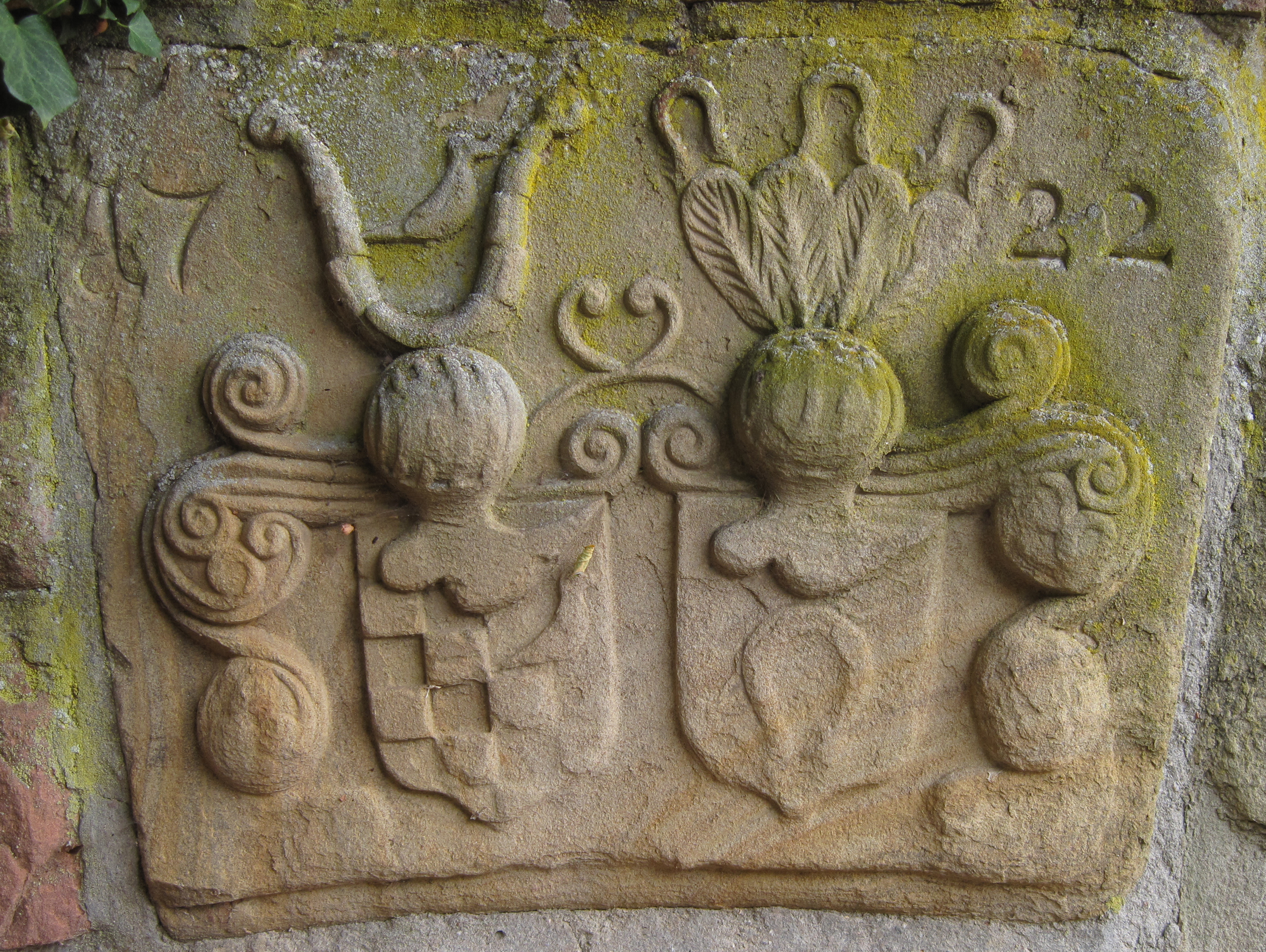
Schloßstraße 18 – armorial stone

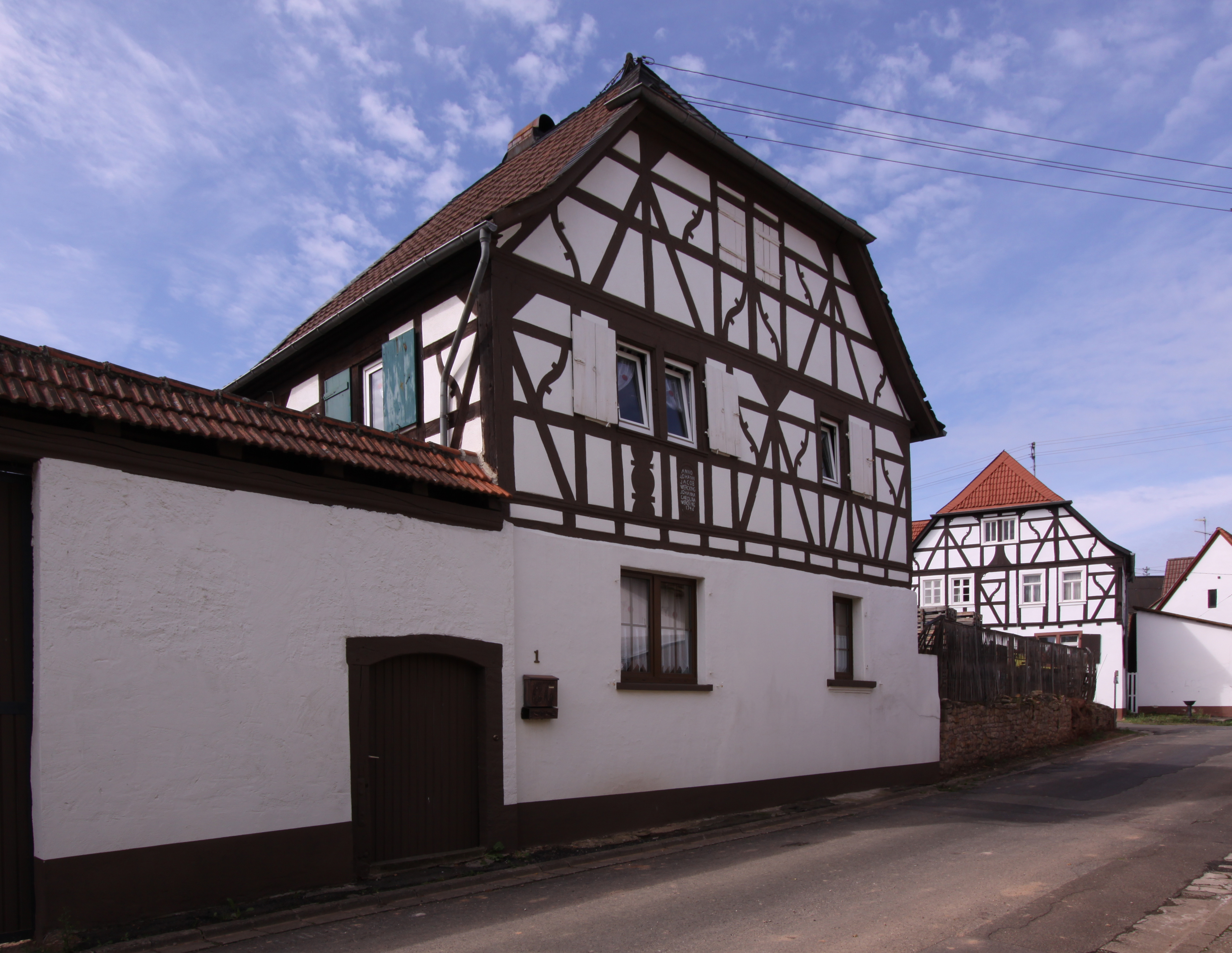
Sponheimer Straße 1 – estate complex

=== More about buildings ===
==== Synagogue ====
At first there was a Jewish prayer room in Mandel at one of the Jewish houses. In the mid-19th century, a synagogue was built. It was made out of red sandstone and had several round-arch windows and corner lesenes. On Kristallnacht (9–10 November 1938), the synagogue's interior was heavily damaged by Brownshirt thugs, leaving little more than a shell of a building. In 1959/1960, what was left of the building was torn down. In 1932, the synagogue stood at Hauptstraße 62.

==== Jewish graveyard ====
The Jewish graveyard (Judenkirchhof) in Mandel was laid out before 1821. There are an older graveyard with 43 graves recognizable as such and – lying apart from this some 10 m away – a newer graveyard with an area of only 25 m^{2} and three graves. The older part stands under monumental protection. The last burial at the newer part took place in 1933 (Julius Hirsch, d. 18 November 1933). The graveyard's area is 1,133 m^{2}. It lies on a hill north of the village in the cadastral area known as "Auf dem Judenkirchhof", field 5. From here there is a panoramic view of the village of Mandel.

=== Clubs ===
The following clubs are active in Mandel:

- Bauern- und Winzerverband — farmers' and winegrowers' association
- Kirchliches Blasorchester — church wind orchestra
- Landfrauenverein — countrywomen's club
- MGV Edelweiß 1931 e.V. — men's singing club
- Spielplatzteam — "playground team"
- TuS Mandel 1901 e.V. — gymnastic and sport club
- VdK Ortsverein — social advocacy group local chapter

== Economy and infrastructure ==
=== Wineries ===
Mandel's website lists five wineries (Weingüter) in the village:

- Weingut Manfred & Gernot Bamberger
- Weingut Arnold Baumberger
- Weingut Römerhof Ralf Baumberger
- Weingut Heinrich Brück
- Weingut Sonnenhof Michael Gräff

=== Transport ===
Running through Mandel is Landesstraße 237. Meeting it in the village are Kreisstraßen 50 (in the west end, at a four-way junction) and 52 (in the east end, at a three-way junction). Serving nearby Bad Kreuznach is a railway station with various connections. Branching off the Nahe Valley Railway (Bingen–Saarbrücken) here is the railway line to Gau Algesheim. From Bingen am Rhein, Regionalbahn trains run by way of the Alsenz Valley Railway, which branches off the Nahe Valley Railway in Bad Münster am Stein, to Kaiserslautern, reaching it in roughly 65 minutes. Running on the line to Saarbrücken and by way of Gau Algesheim and the West Rhine Railway to Mainz are Regional-Express and Regionalbahn trains. The travel time to Mainz lies between 25 and 40 minutes, with about 22 minutes for the direct buses to Bad Kreuznach and the connection time to be added, and to Saarbrücken between 1 hour and 40 minutes and 2 hours and 20 minutes.

=== Public institutions ===
Since 1986, Mandel has had the Schlossberghalle, a multipurpose hall.

=== Education ===
Beside the Schlossberghalle stands the municipal kindergarten. It opened in April 1971, has room for two groups and currently caters to 40 children.

== Famous people ==
=== Sons and daughters of the town ===
- Julius Hirsch (b. 30 October 1882; d. 14 August 1961 in New York)

Considered one of the foremost representatives of modern business science, Hirsch was awarded a Dr. phil. in 1909 after studies in national economics at the Technische Hochschule Aachen and the University of Bonn, later working as a docent at the business college in Cologne. Eventually he rose to be a full professor of private-sector economics at the University of Cologne in 1919. That same year he went to Berlin as the department head for questions relating to transition economics at the Imperial Ministry of Agriculture and also became a Secretary of State in the Imperial Ministry of Economics. In 1924 he began teaching at the Berlin Business College and beginning in 1926 was also honorary professor and leader of the Institute of Business Economics at that university, becoming in 1928 an honorary professor at the Business College and the College of Politics. In 1933 he was involuntarily retired because Jews were no longer welcome under the new Nazi régime, and Hirsch emigrated by way of the Netherlands to Denmark, working there until 1940 as a professor at the Copenhagen Business School. Hitler's forces then marched into Denmark and Hirsch was arrested. In 1941 he emigrated to the United States, teaching there at the New School for Social Research in New York until his death. He was well known as an adviser in politicoeconomic matters not only to private enterprise but even to the US government.

- Wolfgang Knauss (b. 12 December 1933)

Engineering scientist, professor at the California Institute of Technology

== See also ==
- Bad Kreuznach (district)
- Nahe (river)
- Soonwald
- The Holocaust in Germany
- Kristallnacht
- Stolperstein
- Memorial to the Murdered Jews of Europe
- Yad Vashem
