= Roxheim =

- Municipality
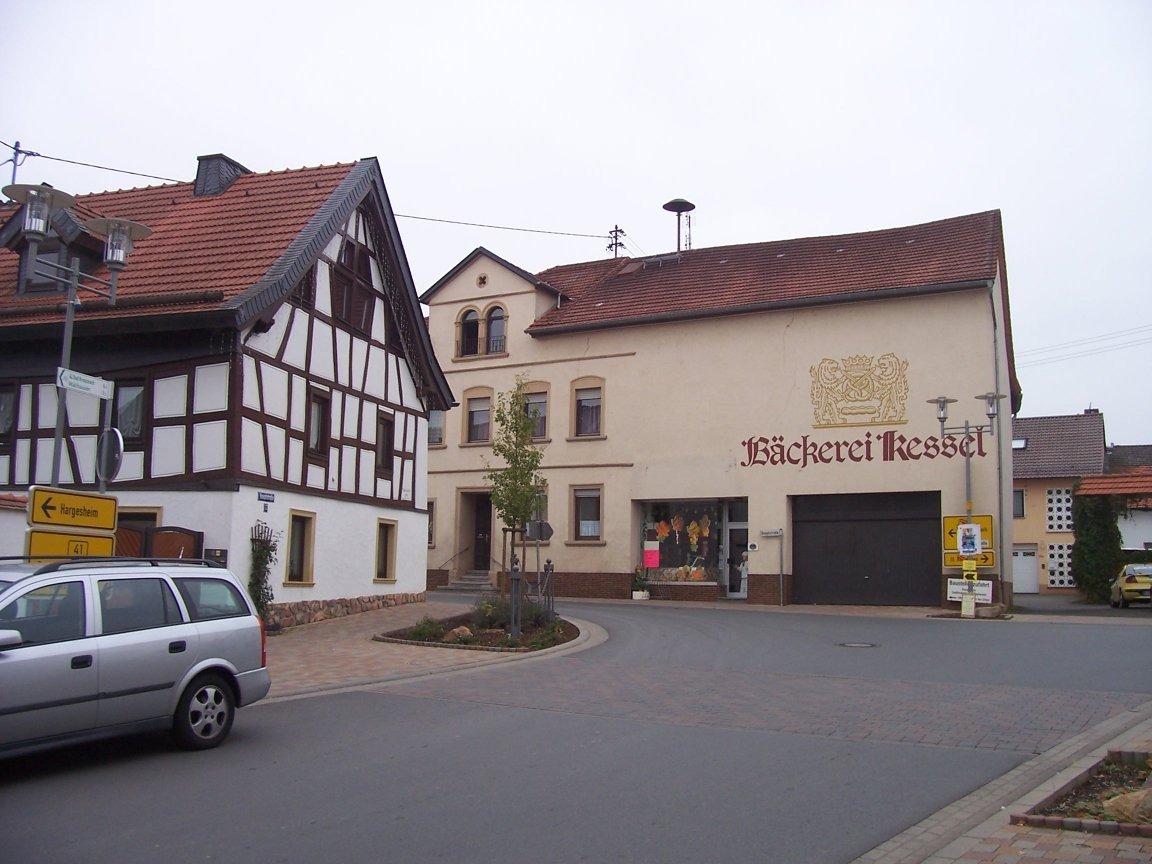
- Hauptstraße

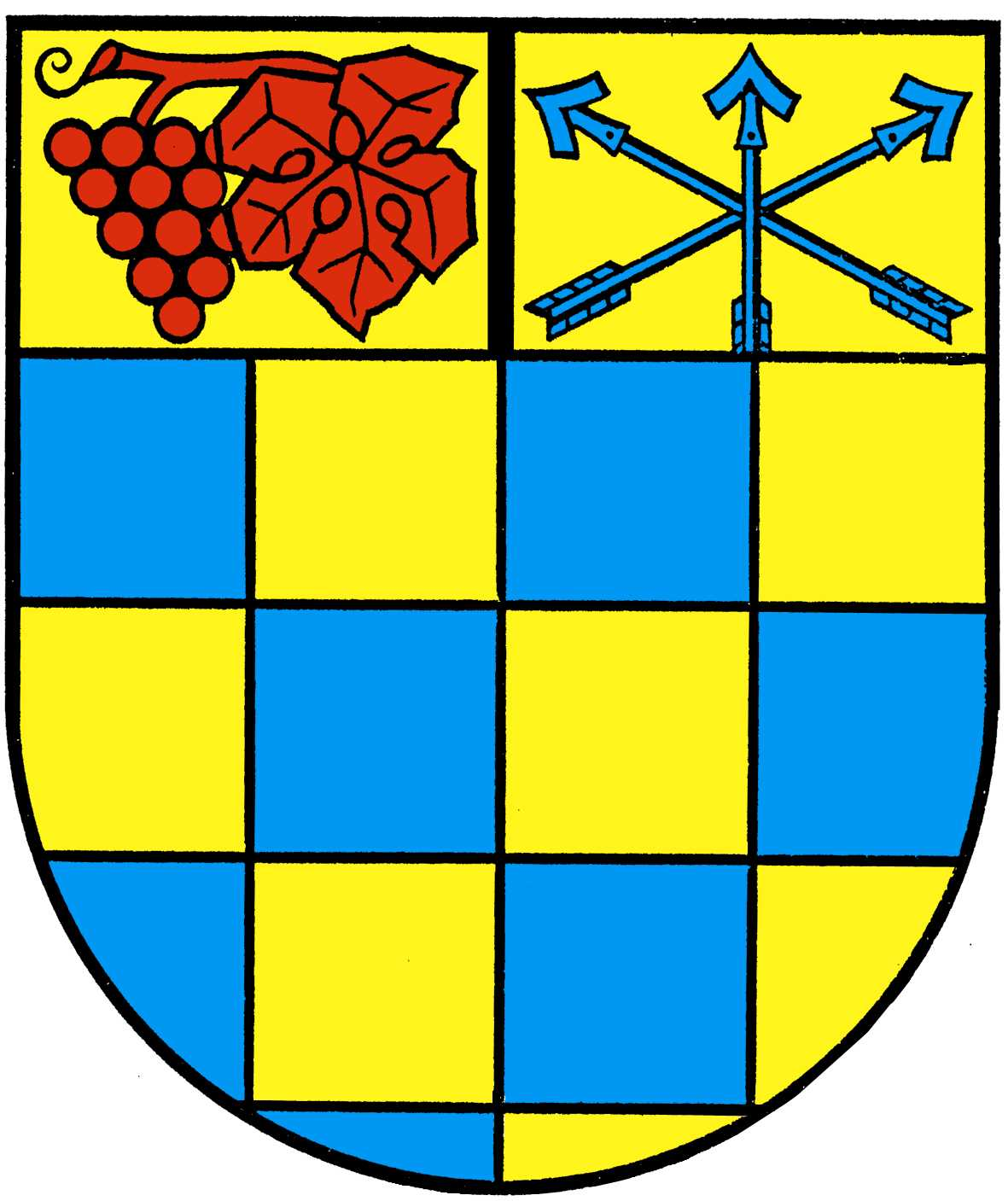
- Coat of arms

- Location of Roxheim within Bad Kreuznach district
- Interactive map of Roxheim
- Location within Germany Location within Rhineland-Palatinate
- Coordinates: 49°51′49.0″N 7°48′33.65″E
- Country: Germany
- State: Rhineland-Palatinate
- District: Bad Kreuznach
- Municipal assoc.: Rüdesheim

Government
  - Mayor (2019–24): Reinhold Bott

Area
  - Total: 5.94 km^{2} (2.29 sq mi)
- Elevation: 160 m (520 ft)

Population (2025-12-31)
  - Total: 2,797
  - Density: 471/km^{2} (1,220/sq mi)
- Time zone: UTC+01:00 (CET)
  - Summer (DST): UTC+02:00 (CEST)
- Postal codes: 55595
- Dialling codes: 0671
- Vehicle registration: KH
- Website: www.roxheim.de

Roxheim is an Ortsgemeinde – a municipality belonging to a Verbandsgemeinde, a kind of collective municipality – in the Bad Kreuznach district in Rhineland-Palatinate, Germany. It belongs to the Verbandsgemeinde of Rüdesheim, whose seat is in the municipality of Rüdesheim an der Nahe. Roxheim is a winegrowing village.

== Geography ==
=== Location ===
Roxheim lies on the Katzenbach north of the Nahe.

=== Neighbouring municipalities ===
Clockwise from the north, Roxheim's neighbours are the municipalities of Gutenberg and Hargesheim, the town of Bad Kreuznach and the municipalities of Rüdesheim an der Nahe, Mandel, Sankt Katharinen, Sommerloch and Wallhausen, all of which likewise lie within the Bad Kreuznach district.

=== Constituent communities ===
Also belonging to Roxheim are the outlying homesteads of Rollars Mühle and Schauß Mühle.

== History ==
In old documents from the 8th century, the village's name appears as Hrocchesheim (773, 781, 785, 790), Roghesheim (813) and later, in the 9th century, Rocchesheim. It contains the name Hrocus or Hroccus and is interpreted as meaning “The Frank Hrocculf’s Home”. In the 8th and 9th centuries, this village heaped up clues in its earliest records to many donations to Fulda Abbey. Prüm Abbey, too, held lands within what is now Roxheim according to those records.

It is mentioned in the Wormser wall-building ordinance from around 900 as one of the places that shared responsibility for maintaining the city wall of Worms.

In 1225, Rhinegrave and Knight Wolfram vom Stein transferred the church patronage that he held – presumably a fief held from the Counts of the Nahegau – to Saint Catherine's Abbey, which existed until the Reformation. Likewise, for 1282, evidence shows that a knight of the House of Dalberg had holdings in Roxheim, Braunweiler, Hargesheim and Gutenberg. Beginning in 1350, the village belonged to the small Sponheim Amt of Gutenberg. In 1369, the Counts of Sponheim were first mentioned as the ones who held Roxheim when Count Walram of Sponheim freed Eberbach Abbey’s holdings in Roxheim and elsewhere from lordly levies and taxes. Prüm Abbey’s holdings around Roxheim then ended up held by the monastery’s Vögte, who were the Imperial ministeriales, the Lords of Stein, and from them, they passed to the Counts of Sponheim. “Income books” kept by the Sponheims’ rightful successors name Roxheim in, for instance, 1476 and 1601. It then belonged to the Oberamt of Kreuznach. In a 15th-century court seal with the circumscription “GERICHT ROXHEIM” (“Roxheim Court”), Saint Sebastian is depicted. Another court seal from 1633 bears the circumscription “ROXHEIMER GERICHTSSIEGEL AO. 1633”. Originally, Roxheim belonged to an Imperial estate complex, for by the 15th century, the villagers were still allowed to bring themselves and their belongings to the town of Kreuznach for safety behind its walls, for which service they had to contribute to the town wall's upkeep, and sometimes even defend it. They also did not need to pay a toll at the town gates. The wars of the 16th to 18th centuries also affected Roxheim. At the time when the “Further” County of Sponheim was partitioned in 1707, Roxheim found itself in the Electorate of the Palatinate Oberamt of Kreuznach. In 1776, the church tithe was only being shared out in fifths. Napoleonic times brought the German lands on the Rhine’s left bank a time of French rule lasting 20 years. Roxheim lay in the Mairie (“Mayoralty”) of Mandel, the Canton of Creuznach, the Arrondissement of Simmern and the Department of Rhin-et-Moselle. The Congress of Vienna (1814-1815) imposed territorial changes of Europe-wide importance in the wake of the Napoleonic Wars. The Kingdom of Prussia was awarded great swathes of the Rhine's left bank. Roxheim was assigned to the Prussian Kreuznach district, formed on 14 May 1816, and together with Mandel, Braunweiler, Gutenberg, Hargesheim, Rüdesheim and Sankt Katharinen, it formed the Bürgermeisterei (“Mayoralty”) of Mandel. As early as 1820, there was a change to local administration under which the two Bürgermeistereien of Mandel and Hüffelsheim (with Hüffelsheim, Münster am Stein, Niederhausen, Norheim, Traisen and Weinsheim) were thrust together into a new, greater Bürgermeisterei of Hüffelsheim-Mandel. Although the administrative seat at first lay in Weinsheim, it was moved in 1853 to Rüdesheim. Apart from the transfer of Bad Münster am Stein out of the Bürgermeisterei in 1912, little about this administrative arrangement changed until administrative restructuring in Rhineland-Palatinate in 1969 and 1970. Especially after the Second World War, the originally purely agriculturally orientated municipality, like so many other villages in the district, grew into a modern residential community. It casts itself as a home community right near the district seat of Bad Kreuznach (on which it borders, and to which there are excellent road links) where the once so important agricultural activity (cropraising and livestock raising) have in recent years greatly lost their economic eminence. On the other hand, winegrowing has lately gained considerable importance with its bottled-wine marketing, its Straußwirtschaften and the winemaking estates that run them.

== Religion ==
As at 31 December 2013, there are 2,368 full-time residents in Roxheim, and of those, 1,086 are Evangelical (45.861%), 808 are Catholic (34.122%), 1 belongs to the Bad Kreuznach-Koblenz Jewish worship community (0.042%), 50 (2.111%) belong to other religious groups and 423 (17.863%) either have no religion or will not reveal their religious affiliation.

== Politics ==
=== Municipal council ===
The council is made up of 16 council members, who were elected by proportional representation at the municipal election held on 7 June 2009, and the honorary mayor as chairman. The municipal election held on 7 June 2009 yielded the following results:

Year	SPD	CDU	FWG	Total
2009	4	6	6	16 seats
2004	4	6	6	16 seats

=== Mayor ===
Roxheim's mayor is Reinhold Bott, and his deputies are Dietrich Braun (FWG), Klaus Niemann (CDU) and Alfred Heil (SPD).

=== Coat of arms ===
The municipality's arms might be described thus: Chequy of sixteen azure and Or, on a chief party per pale Or a bunch of grapes slipped and leafed of one gules and Or three arrows, two per saltire and the third surmounting them in pale of the first.

The bunch of grapes in dexter chief refers to the village's winegrowing and the “chequy” main field is a reference to the village's former allegiance to the Counts of Sponheim, while the three crossed arrows symbolize Saint Sebastian, who was martyred by being shot through with arrows. Indeed, this actual image can be found on Roxheim's old court seal with the circumscription Gericht Roxheim (“Roxheim Court”).

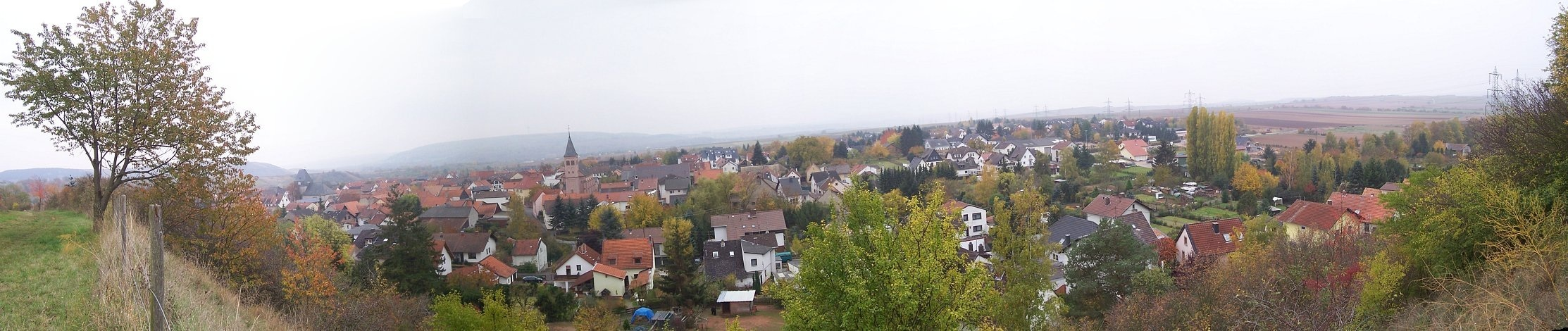
Panorama of Roxheim

== Culture and sightseeing ==
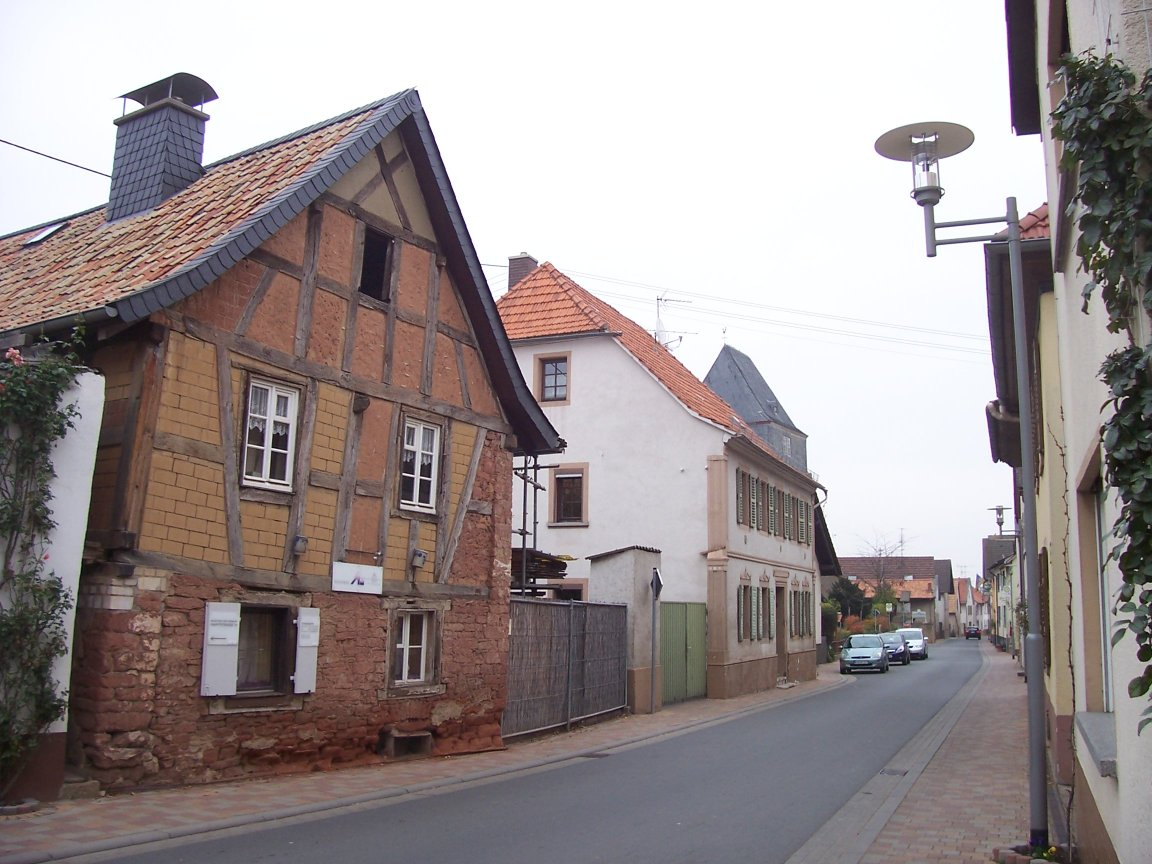
Hauptstraße

=== Buildings ===
The following are listed buildings or sites in Rhineland-Palatinate’s Directory of Cultural Monuments:

- Evangelical parish church, Hauptstraße 24 – quire tower towards 1300, belfry floor and hip roof possibly from the 18th century, Baroque nave, 1738
- Saint Sebastian’s Catholic Parish Church (Pfarrkirche St. Sebastian), Hauptstraße 71 – Romanesque Revival sandstone-block building, 1869–1871, Building Master Himpler, Wallerfangen
- Hauptstraße, graveyard – warriors’ memorial 1914-1918, steles, 1920s
- Hauptstraße 69 – Catholic rectory; Late Baroque building with hip roof, 1740; Late Baroque Crucifix, marked 1788
- Obere Kirchgasse 1 – Late Baroque timber-frame house, partly solid, late 18th century
- Untere Kirchgasse 2 – Evangelical rectory; Late Baroque plastered building, about 1750

=== Clubs ===
The following clubs are active in Roxheim:

- CDU Ortsverband — Christian Democratic Union of Germany local chapter
- Deutsches Rotes Kreuz — German Red Cross local chapter
- Drachen-und Gleitsegelclub Nahetal e.V. — hang gliding club
- Evangelische Zunft Von 1864 Roxheim — Evangelical “guild” (see below)
- Förderverein Roxheimer Kinder und Jugend e.V. — child and youth promotional association
- Freiwillige Feuerwehr — volunteer fire brigade
- FWG Freie Wählergemeinschaft — Free Voters association
- Katholische Zunft Von Roxheim — Catholic “guild” (see below)
- MGV “Frohsinn” — men's singing club
- Musikverein Musikfreunde — music club
- “Roxemer Theäterche” — amateur theatre group
- SPD Ortsverein — Social Democratic Party of Germany local chapter
- TUS 1906 Roxheim — gymnastic and sport club
- VfL 1976 Roxheim — exercise club

The two “guilds” mentioned in the list are associations that lend aid and comfort to the bereaved at their time of loss. The Evangelical one is in fact the village's oldest club or association of any kind, having been founded, as its name suggests, in 1864. It has stood at the ready without interruption since then, making it older than the modern, united German state itself (Unification came about seven years later, in 1871).

=== Sport and leisure ===
Roxheim has a municipal library., five playgrounds, one of which has a climbing wall, grilling pavilions in the nearby woods, a riding stable, a small ninepin bowling alley with two lanes, a hang gliding club, a beach volleyball court, a network of hiking trails, a cycling circuit built on an old narrow-gauge railway's right-of-way and a skatepark.

== Economy and infrastructure ==
=== Transport ===
Roxheim lies at the junction of Landesstraße 237 and Kreisstraße 51. The former also meets Landesstraße 236 in the village's east end. Both this road and Kreisstraße 51 lead southwards to a common interchange onto Bundesstraße 41, leading to Bad Kreuznach’s northeast end and the Autobahn A 61 (Koblenz–Ludwigshafen) not far beyond. Landesstraße 236 also leads northwards to meet the same Autobahn at Waldlaubersheim. Serving neighbouring Bad Kreuznach is a railway station. Branching off the Nahe Valley Railway (Bingen–Saarbrücken) here is the railway line to Gau Algesheim. From Bingen am Rhein, Regionalbahn trains run by way of the Alsenz Valley Railway, which branches off the Nahe Valley Railway in Bad Münster am Stein, to Kaiserslautern, reaching it in roughly 65 minutes. Running on the line to Saarbrücken and by way of Gau Algesheim and the West Rhine Railway to Mainz are Regional-Express and Regionalbahn trains. The travel time to Mainz lies between 25 and 40 minutes, and to Saarbrücken between 1 hour and 40 minutes and 2 hours and 20 minutes.

=== Education ===
Unlike many other villages, Roxheim has retained responsibility for its own primary school. With the exception of a few children who come from surrounding villages, all the pupils there are from the village itself. Hence, there is no school bus service. Roxheim also has a daycare centre and a municipal library.

=== Established businesses ===
Roxheim has a grocery shop, a butcher’s shop and a bakery. There are also two inns, one of which is at a winery.

=== Winegrowing ===
The following wineries can be found in Roxheim:

- Weingut Heil
- Weingut Karl Weiß
- Weingut Merz
- Weingut Werner Hartmann
- Weinhaus Weingut Siegmar Weinsheimer

== Notable people ==
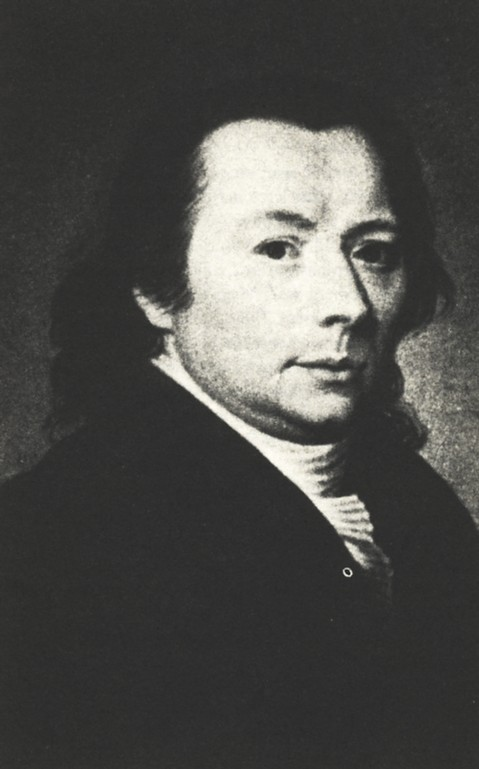
Johann Friedrich Abegg

- Johann Friedrich Abegg (b. 30 November 1765; d. 16 December 1840 in Heidelberg), theologian, professor in Heidelberg
