= Roxheim Synagogue =

Former synagogue in Bobenheim-Roxheim, Germany

- German: Roxheim Synagoge
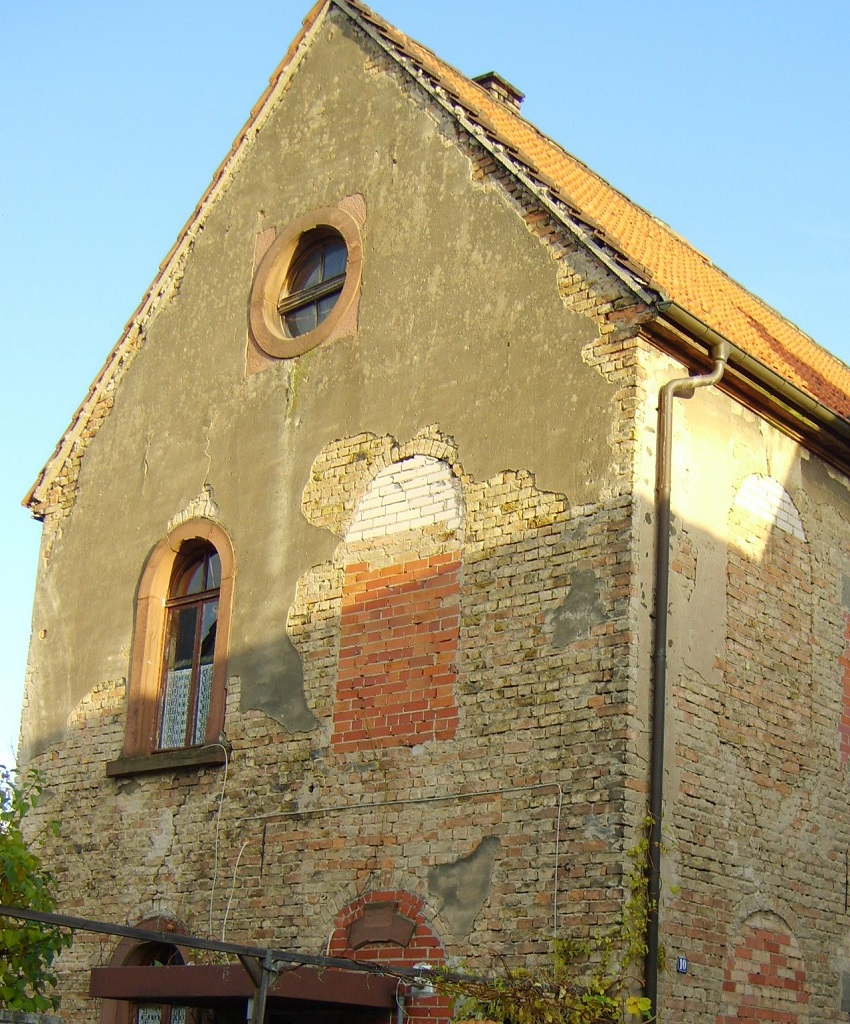
- The former synagogue, as a house, in 2008

- Location of the demolished synagogue in Rhineland-Palatinate

Religion
- Affiliation: Judaism (former)
- Rite: Nusach Ashkenaz
- Ecclesiastical or organisational status: Synagogue (1889–1930); Residence (1930–2017)
- Status: Abandoned (as a synagogue); Repurposed (as a dwelling); Demolished

Location
- Location: 10 Bobenheimer Strasse, Roxheim, Rhineland-Palatinate
- Country: Germany
- Coordinates: 49°34′48″N 8°21′53″E

Architecture
- Type: Synagogue architecture
- Completed: 1889
- Demolished: 2017
- Materials: Stone

The Roxheim Synagogue (German: Roxheim Synagoge) was a Jewish congregation and synagogue, that was located on Bobenheimer Strasse in Roxheim, in the state of Rhineland-Palatinate, Germany. The synagogue was built in 1889. The unrestored stone building was located and was demolished in 2017.

== History ==
The Jewish community in Roxheim used a smaller synagogue, which was destroyed in a heavy flood of the river Rhine in 1882. In 1889, a new building was consecrated in the same location. It was taller than the predecessor. There was a teacher's apartment on the ground floor and the prayer room upstairs. The documents report a painting "with rosettes, friezes and decorative lines". Parts of the Torah shrine were gilded.

After World War I, the Roxheim Jewish community had insufficient adult men to maintain a minyan. The community dissolved around 1930. The synagogue was sold and converted into a residential building. Because of the change of ownership, it was not damaged during the Nazi era.

The building, on Bobenheimer Strasse, was within sight of the Catholic parish church of St. Maria Magdalena from 1834. The building was not listed as a monument. The preservation status of the building ended in 1985. It was the last example of a synagogue in the northern Rhein-Pfalz-Kreis and in the eastern part of the former district of Frankenthal.

== See also ==
- History of the Jews in Germany
- List of synagogues in Germany (in German)
