= Sankt Katharinen, Bad Kreuznach =

Sankt Katharinen
- Municipality
- Coat of arms

- Location of Sankt Katharinen within Bad Kreuznach district
- Interactive map of Sankt Katharinen
- Location within Germany Location within Rhineland-Palatinate
- Coordinates: 49°52′04″N 7°46′13″E
- Country: Germany
- State: Rhineland-Palatinate
- District: Bad Kreuznach
- Municipal assoc.: Rüdesheim

Government
  - Mayor (2019–24): Manuel Schneider

Area
  - Total: 1.7 km^{2} (0.66 sq mi)
- Elevation: 217 m (712 ft)

Population (2025-12-31)
  - Total: 385
  - Density: 230/km^{2} (590/sq mi)
- Time zone: UTC+01:00 (CET)
  - Summer (DST): UTC+02:00 (CEST)
- Postal codes: 55595
- Dialling codes: 06706
- Vehicle registration: KH

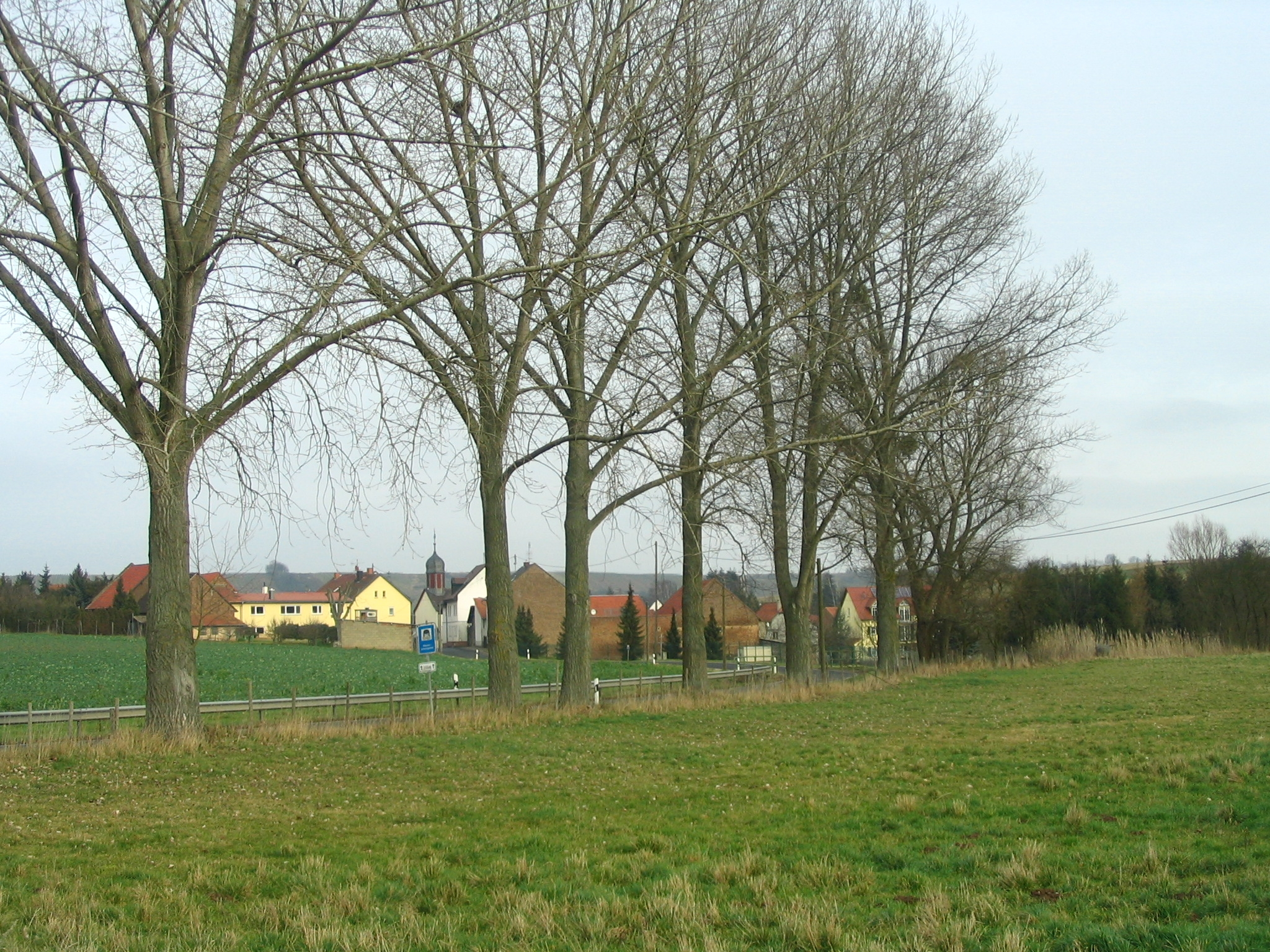
View of the village, 2007

Sankt Katharinen (German pronunciation: [zaŋkt kataˈʁiːnən]; official spelling until 25 November 1936: Sankt Catharinen) is an Ortsgemeinde – a municipality belonging to a Verbandsgemeinde, a kind of collective municipality – in the Bad Kreuznach district in Rhineland-Palatinate, Germany. It belongs to the Verbandsgemeinde of Rüdesheim, whose seat is in the municipality of Rüdesheim an der Nahe.

== Geography ==
=== Location ===
Sankt Katharinen lies in the Naheland at the southern edge of the Gauchswald (forest) and therefore the Hunsrück. Sankt Katharinen sits at an elevation of 217 m above sea level and its municipal area measures 1.70 km^{2}.

=== Neighbouring municipalities ===
Clockwise from the north, Sankt Katharinen’s neighbours are the municipalities of Sommerloch, Roxheim, Mandel and Braunweiler, all of which likewise lie within the Bad Kreuznach district.

== History ==
The village of Sankt Katharinen goes back to the Cistercian monastery of the same name that stood here from the early 13th century until 1574. This monastery was home to Cistercian nuns. In the early 13th century, it was founded by the nuns from Kumbd Abbey (Kloster Kumbd in German; the village there is still called Klosterkumbd), and in 1219, Archbishop of Mainz Siegfried II acknowledged the settlement. In 1574, however, the Electorate of the Palatinate put an end to its days as a monastic institution. Oversight was exercised by the Abbot of Eberbach Abbey in the Rheingau. Sankt Katharinen was among Eberbach’s incorporated monasteries. The founding story translated into German by Johann Christian von Stramberg and Heinrich Pröhle, farmer Adalbert’s epic poem, goes back to Johannes Trithemius’s Sponheim Chronicle, which was in Latin. Nothing now remains of the monastery, but the village that sprang up with it is still there.

== Religion ==
As at 31 December 2013, there are 367 full-time residents in Sankt Katharinen, and of those, 88 are Evangelical (23.978%), 208 are Catholic (56.676%) and 71 (19.346%) either have no religion or will not reveal their religious affiliation.

== Politics ==
=== Municipal council ===
The council is made up of 8 council members, who were elected by majority vote at the municipal election held on 7 June 2009, and the honorary mayor as chairman.

=== Mayor ===
Sankt Katharinen’s mayor is Manuel Schneider, and his deputies are Hans-Walter Nies and Markus Krieg.

=== Coat of arms ===
The municipality’s arms might be described thus: Argent in base an inescutcheon chequy of twenty azure and Or standing behind and above which Saint Catherine vested gules, crined and crowned of the third holding in her dexter hand a sword of the fourth hilted and pommelled of the third palewise point to base, and in her sinister hand half a wheel spoked of four sable.

== Culture and sightseeing ==
=== Buildings ===
The following are listed buildings or sites in Rhineland-Palatinate’s Directory of Cultural Monuments:

- Catholic Church of the Most Blessed Virgin (Kirche Allerseligste Jungfrau), Im Hopfengarten 1 – aisleless church, 1858
- Flurstraße 12 – former school; one-floor Heimatstil building built to standard plan, hipped mansard roof, about 1910
- Klosterstraße – wayside cross, Late Baroque, marked 1756
- Near Mühlenstraße 5 – wayside cross, Late Baroque, marked 1786
- Wayside cross, on Kreisstraße 51, west of the village – marked 1877, corpus possibly from about 1900

== Economy and infrastructure ==
=== Transport ===
Sankt Katharinen lies at the junction of Kreisstraßen 50 and 51, which in fact run concurrently for one block through the village centre as Klosterstraße (“Monastery Street”), a reference to the village’s monastic origins. The latter road leads eastwards to Roxheim, whence it runs to Bundesstraße 41, leading to Bad Kreuznach’s northeast end and the Autobahn A 61 (Koblenz–Ludwigshafen) not far beyond. Serving nearby Bad Kreuznach is a railway station. Branching off the Nahe Valley Railway (Bingen–Saarbrücken) here is the railway line to Gau Algesheim. From Bingen am Rhein, Regionalbahn trains run by way of the Alsenz Valley Railway, which branches off the Nahe Valley Railway in Bad Münster am Stein, to Kaiserslautern, reaching it in roughly 65 minutes. Running on the line to Saarbrücken and by way of Gau Algesheim and the West Rhine Railway to Mainz are Regional-Express and Regionalbahn trains. The travel time to Mainz lies between 25 and 40 minutes, and to Saarbrücken between 1 hour and 40 minutes and 2 hours and 20 minutes.
