= Allenfeld =

- Municipality
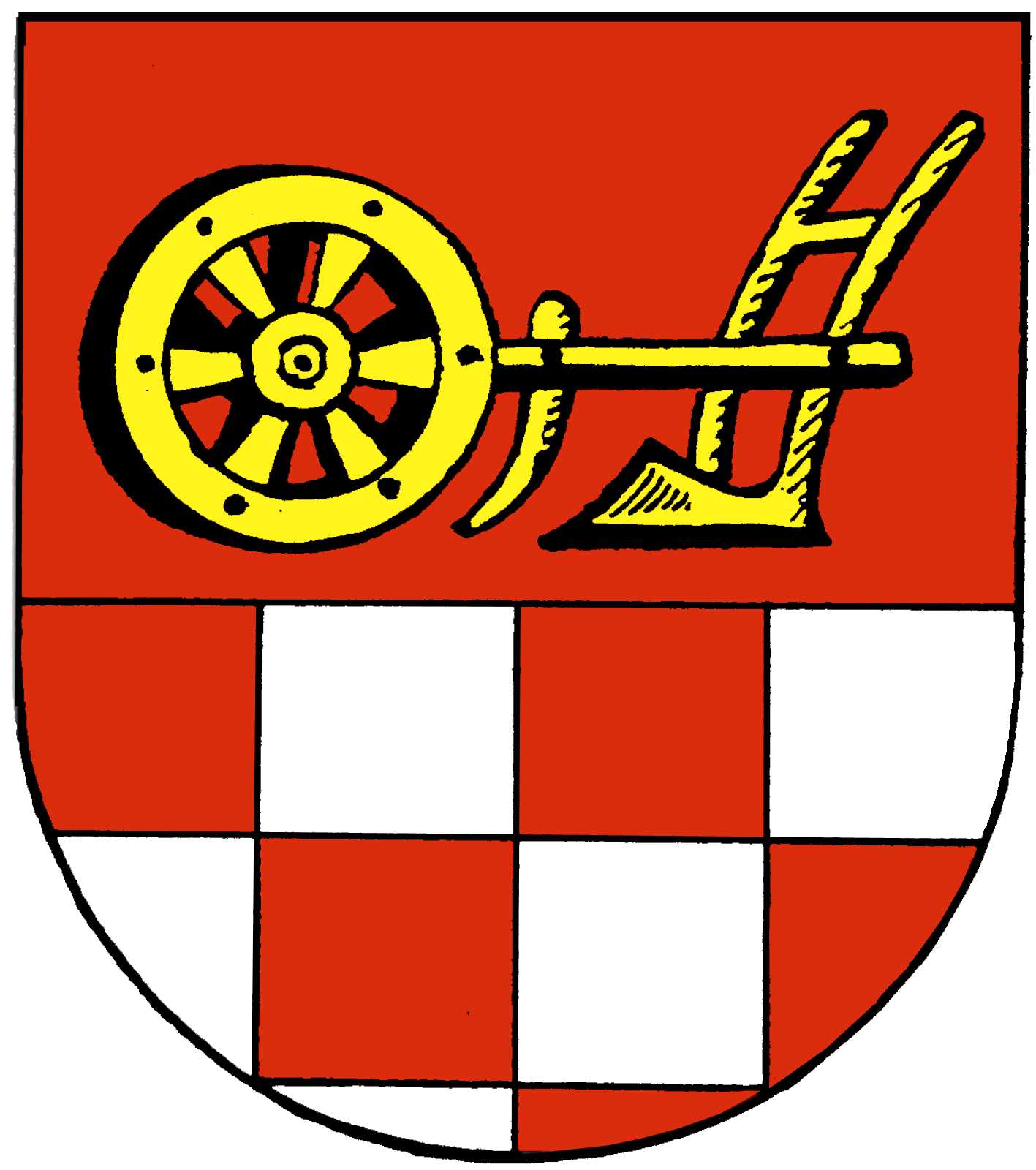
- Coat of arms

- Location of Allenfeld within Bad Kreuznach district
- Interactive map of Allenfeld
- Location within Germany Location within Rhineland-Palatinate
- Coordinates: 49°52′2″N 7°40′5″E
- Country: Germany
- State: Rhineland-Palatinate
- District: Bad Kreuznach
- Municipal assoc.: Rüdesheim

Government
  - Mayor (2019–24): Florian Keller

Area
  - Total: 2.98 km^{2} (1.15 sq mi)
- Elevation: 375 m (1,230 ft)

Population (2025-12-31)
  - Total: 228
  - Density: 76.5/km^{2} (198/sq mi)
- Time zone: UTC+01:00 (CET)
  - Summer (DST): UTC+02:00 (CEST)
- Postal codes: 55595
- Dialling codes: 06756
- Vehicle registration: KH

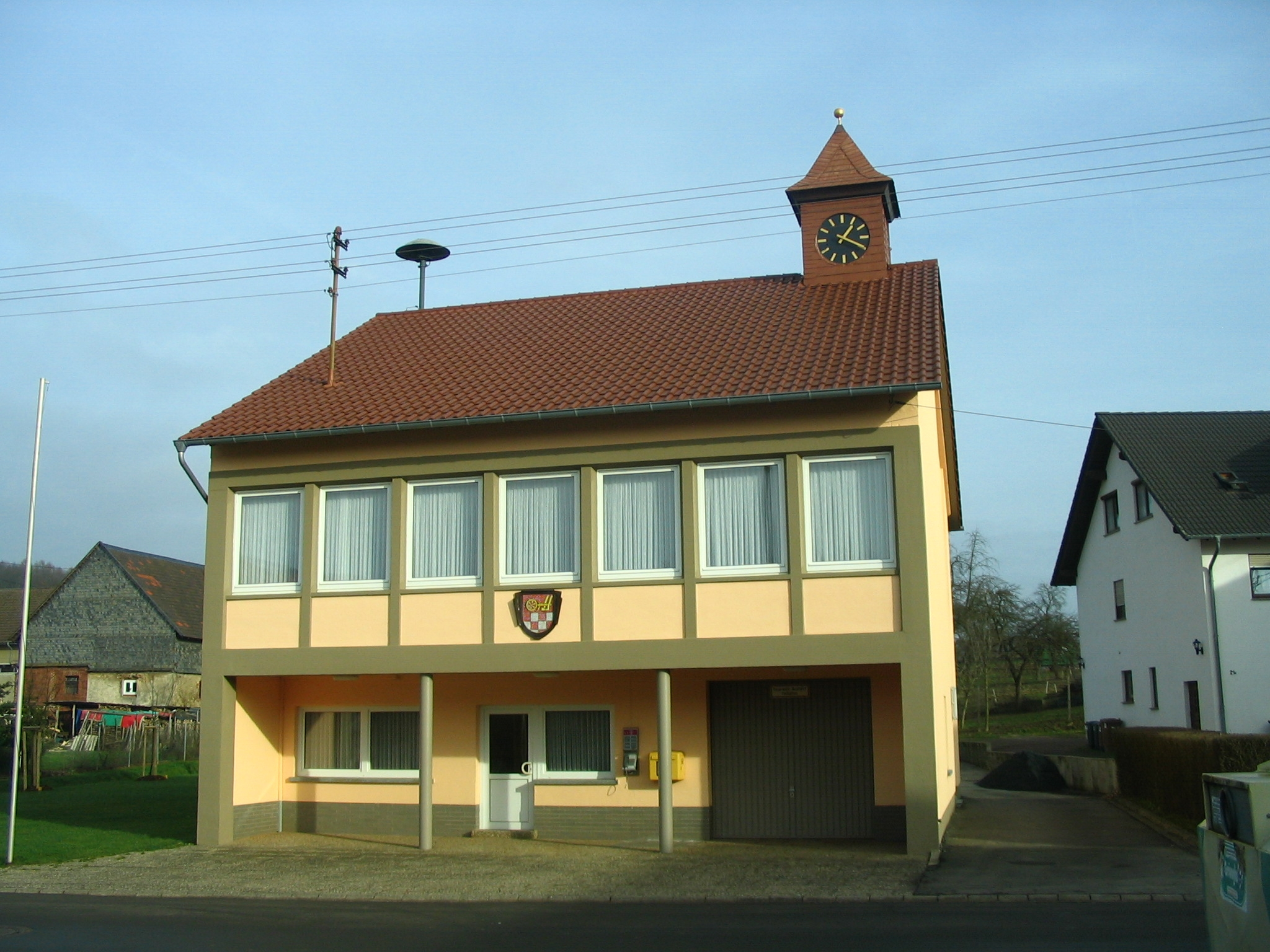
Municipal hall in the village core

Allenfeld is an Ortsgemeinde – a municipality belonging to a Verbandsgemeinde, a kind of collective municipality – in the Bad Kreuznach district in Rhineland-Palatinate, Germany. It belongs to the Verbandsgemeinde of Rüdesheim, whose seat is in the municipality of Rüdesheim an der Nahe.

== Geography ==
=== Location ===
Allenfeld lies in the southern Hunsrück, between the Soonwald and the Gauchswald. Its elevation is 375 m above sea level and its municipal area measures 2.98 km².

== History ==
The village’s name first cropped up in 1438 as Aldenfeld in the Sponheim taxation book. Beginning no later than the 12th century, Allenfeld belonged to the County of Sponheim and in the 13th century was grouped into the newly formed administrative entity called the Amt of Winterburg, which as of 1416 belonged to the so-called “Hinder” County of Sponheim-Starkenburg.

=== Population development ===
The table shows Allenfeld’s population development. The figures in the table from 1871 to 1987 are based on censuses:

Year	Inhabitants
1815	177
1835	204
1871	189
1905	175
1939	141

Year	Inhabitants
1950	149
1961	142
1970	149
1987	142
2005	193

== Religion ==
As at 31 August 2013, there are 195 full-time residents in Allenfeld, and of those, 106 are Evangelical (54.359%), 35 are Catholic (17.949%) and 54 (27.692%) either have no religion or will not reveal their religious affiliation.

== Politics ==
=== Municipal council ===
The council is made up of 6 council members, who were elected by majority vote at the municipal election held on 7 June 2009, and the honorary mayor as chairman.

=== Mayor ===
Allenfeld’s mayor is Florian Keller.

=== Coat of arms ===
The municipality’s arms might be described thus: Per fess gules a plough Or and chequy of twelve gules and argent.

== Culture and sightseeing ==
=== Buildings ===
The following are listed buildings or sites in Rhineland-Palatinate’s Directory of Cultural Monuments:

- Brunnenstraße 18 – timber-frame building with half-hipped roof, partly slated, marked 1833
- On Kreisstraße 28 – signpost, Classicist sandstone obelisk, about 1820
- On Landesstraße 238 – signpost, Classicist sandstone obelisk, about 1820
- On Landesstraße 238 – signpost, Classicist sandstone obelisk, about 1820

=== Sport and leisure ===
A particular highlight in Allenfeld is the cycle path that follows the old right-of-way once used by the former Kreuznacher Kleinbahnen, a narrow gauge railway network that closed in 1936. The path snakes its way along one side of the Gräfenbach, coming back along the other side of the Ellerbach valley. The path reaches its highest point in Allenfeld at some 370 m above sea level. Also found here is the old Allenfeld winepress, which was once used to press the fruit from the meadow orchards, which was then made into must.
