= Johann Friedrich Abegg =

German theologian (1765-1840)

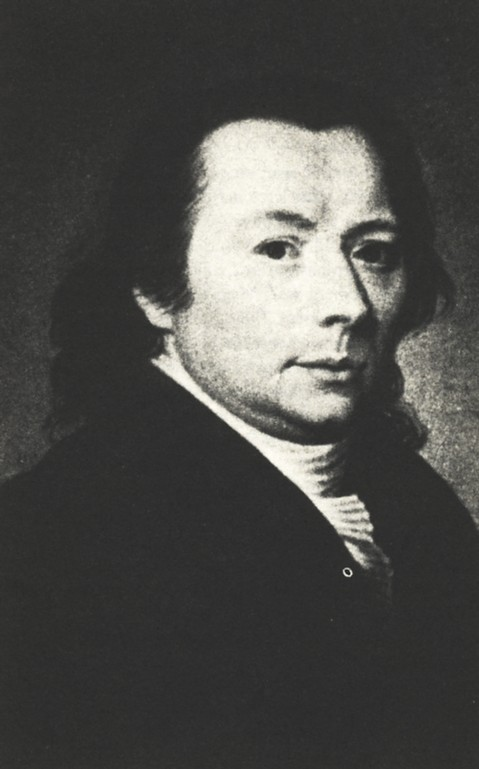
- Born: 30 November 1765; Roxheim, near Kreuznach
- Died: December 16, 1840 (aged 75); Heidelberg
- Occupation: theologian

Johann Friedrich Abegg (November 30, 1765 in Roxheim near Kreuznach – December 16, 1840 in Heidelberg) was a German theologian.

He was the brother of many siblings in a family of preachers, and was adopted in 1786 as candidate for the preacher office in the Electorate of the Palatinate. He visited the college in Heidelberg from 1789 to 1794 and also worked as extraordinary professor of philology since 1791. In 1794 he started to practise as priest, first in Boxberg, then in Leimen (1799) and Heidelberg (1808) in the parishes St. Peter and Heiliggeist.

Beginning in 1807 he was member of the Grand-Ducal Higher Clergy Council of Baden. In 1819 he was appointed professor of practical theology at the University of Heidelberg, where he also acquired his doctorate in theology.

Only few written works exist of Abegg, as he always saw his duty more in the application of his studies than in the theory. However, he held an important place in Heidelberg's society of the time, being an intimate friend of romantic personalities like Anton Friedrich Justus Thibaut, Friedrich Creuzer, Carl Daub and Friedrich Wilhelm Carl Umbreit.

== Sources ==
- Allgemeine Deutsche Biographie - online version
