= Wallhausen, Rhineland-Palatinate =

Wallhausen
- Municipality
- Coat of arms

- Location of Wallhausen within Bad Kreuznach district
- Interactive map of Wallhausen
- Location within Germany Location within Rhineland-Palatinate
- Coordinates: 49°53′17.48″N 7°45′56.16″E
- Country: Germany
- State: Rhineland-Palatinate
- District: Bad Kreuznach
- Municipal assoc.: Rüdesheim

Government
  - Mayor (2019–24): Franz-Josef Jost (CDU)

Area
  - Total: 10.30 km^{2} (3.98 sq mi)
- Elevation: 200 m (660 ft)

Population (2025-12-31)
  - Total: 1,645
  - Density: 159.7/km^{2} (413.6/sq mi)
- Time zone: UTC+01:00 (CET)
  - Summer (DST): UTC+02:00 (CEST)
- Postal codes: 55595
- Dialling codes: 06706
- Vehicle registration: KH

Wallhausen (German pronunciation: [ˈvalˌhaʊzn̩]) is a municipality in the district of Bad Kreuznach in Rhineland-Palatinate, in western Germany.

The town is known for quaint, family-operated, wineries and its connectivity to walking paths around the Nahe wine region.

== Location ==
Wallhausen lies 14 km northwest of Bad Kreuznach in the vicinity of the Nahe Valley, on the edge of the Soonwalds. The village is surrounded by vineyards. This wine region is not far from the "middle" Rhine River, just 24 km from Bingen am Rhein or 32 km from Ingelheim am Rhein.

Nearby villages include Sankt Katharinen, Spabrücken, Braunweiler and Sommerloch.

== History ==
From various sources the initial mentions in the documentation is either in the year 1195 by the Bishopric of Speyer, or in the year 1021 after which a Frankish compatriot built a "Waldhus" (forest house).

A church of in Wallhausen was mentioned in 1219.

On the May 1, 1219 the mayor and the municipality to Wallhausen was authorized by the Godebold of Weyerbach. Today the Roman Catholic Church is named St. Lawrence. It was built in 1792. The church has branches in the two nearby villages of Dalberg and Sommerloch.

A school teacher in Wallhausen was first mentioned in a report on a church visitation from 1790. His annual salary was 15 bushels of corn and 30 guilders.

In Wallhausen is the castle of the Dalberg family, the former treasurer (Kämmerer) of Worms. Today the castle is owned by the Prince of Salm-Salm. This family of Wallhausen are members of the Rheinische Ritterschaft (Rhenish knights).

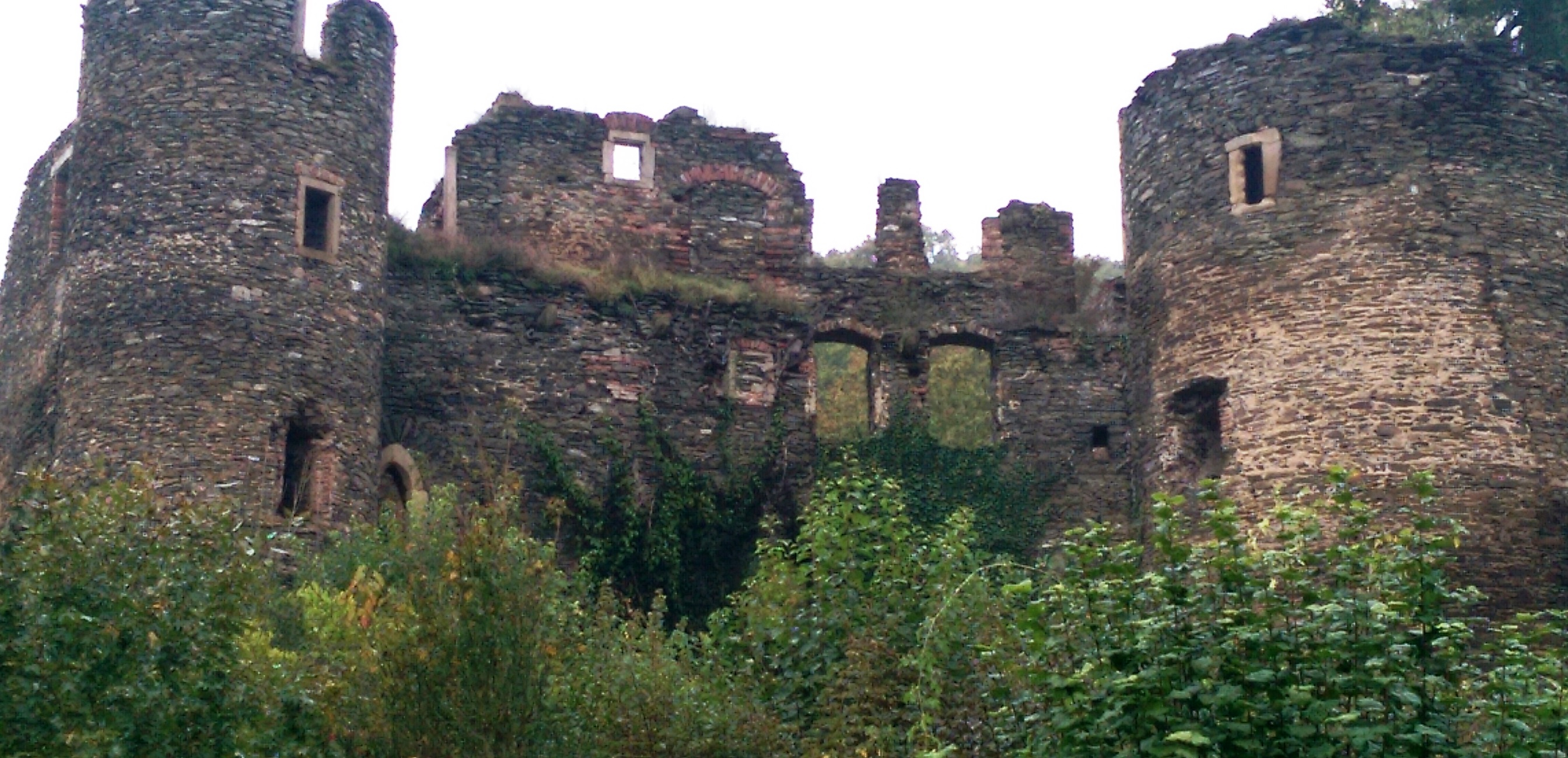
The former Dalberg castle is an easy walk from Wallhausen

== Wine culture ==
Wallhausen has significant activity in the wine business, including 226 hectares (558 acres) of vines as of 2007. This is one of the most active wine towns in the large Nahe wine-producing region.

As of 2014, 11 firms are noted in the Wallhausen wine business directory; these include Weingut Eckes, Richard u Herman Datz, Weingut Rudolf Mindnich, Weingut Schmitt-Peitz, Alfred Barthelmeh, Edwin Schott, Paul Newmann, Ludwig Schild, Josef Puth, Weingut Franz Jaeckel, and Alfred Wilbert.

== Notable people ==
- Frédéric Prinz von Anhalt (born 1943)
- Josef Knichel, Priest, Concentration camp prisoner in Dachau
- August Wilhelm Schynse, Priest
- Franz-Karl Prince of Salm-Salm (1917–2011), Of the Castle Wallhausen
- Michael, Prince of Salm-Salm (born 1953)
- Rudolf Mindnich, wine producer and wine ambassador
- Johann Jacobi von Wallhausen, Military writer, born about. 1581, died 1627
