= August Schynse =

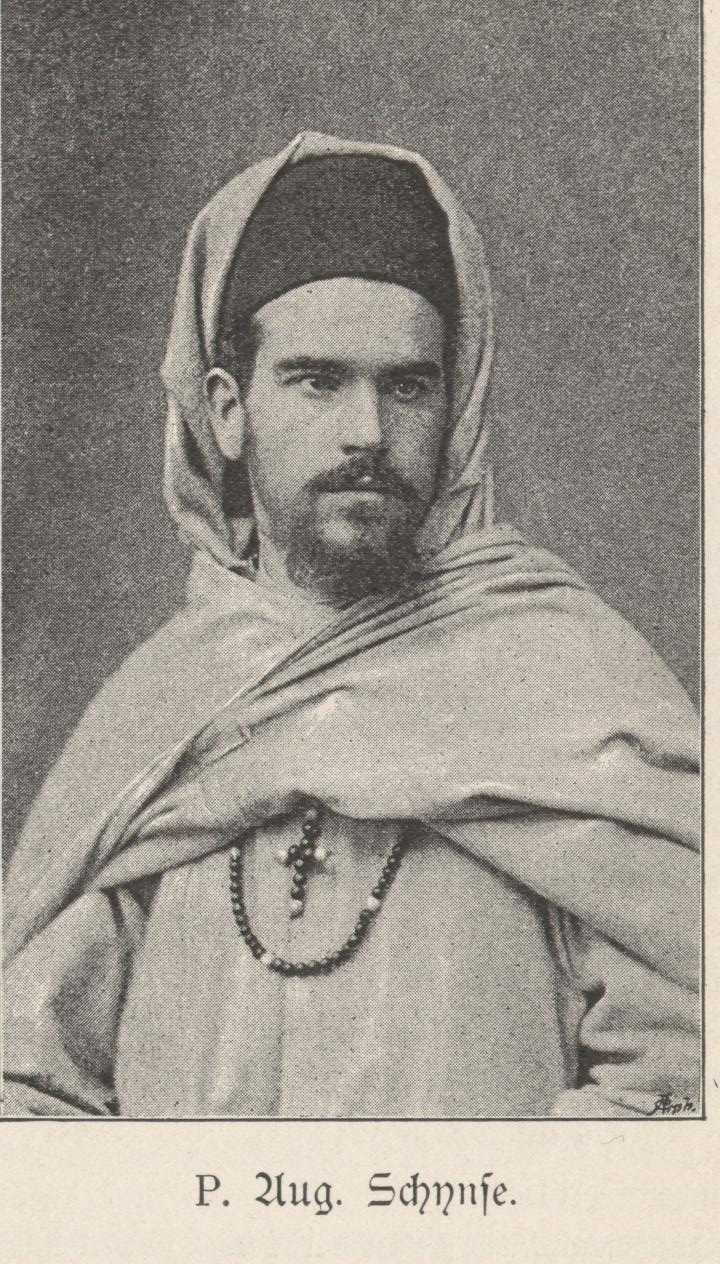
Fr. August Schynse, M.Afr.

August Schynse (1857–1891) was a German Catholic missionary and African explorer born at Wallhausen, near Kreuznach, and educated at Bonn. He attended the seminary at Speyer, became a priest in 1880, and in 1882 entered the service of the African Missions (Fathers of the Missions d'Afrique or White Fathers) and was active in work in French Algeria. He was part of an expedition to the Congo in 1885. In 1888 he made a trip to East Africa and from there accompanied Stanley and Emin Pasha to the coast. With Emin he went to the Victoria Nyanza, and then spent almost a year in explorations between that lake and Uganda. He wrote: Zwei Jahre am Kongo (1889) and Mit Stanley und Emin Pascha durch Deutsch Ost-Afrika (1890).

== Publications ==
- Hespers, Pater Schynses letzte Reisen (Cologne, 1892)
- Hespers, Pater August Schynse und seine Missionsreisen in Afrika (Strassburg, 1894)
