= Sommerloch =

- Municipality
- Coat of arms

- Location of Sommerloch within Bad Kreuznach district
- Interactive map of Sommerloch
- Location within Germany Location within Rhineland-Palatinate
- Coordinates: 49°53′N 07°46′E
- Country: Germany
- State: Rhineland-Palatinate
- District: Bad Kreuznach
- Municipal assoc.: Rüdesheim

Government
  - Mayor (2019–24): Thomas Haßlinger

Area
  - Total: 2.53 km^{2} (0.98 sq mi)
- Elevation: 246 m (807 ft)

Population (2025-12-31)
  - Total: 401
  - Density: 158/km^{2} (411/sq mi)
- Time zone: UTC+01:00 (CET)
  - Summer (DST): UTC+02:00 (CEST)
- Postal codes: 55595
- Dialling codes: 06706
- Vehicle registration: KH
- Website: www.vg-ruedesheim.de

Sommerloch is a municipality in the district of Bad Kreuznach administrative region in Rhineland-Palatinate, in western Germany.

Greeting Sign at Sommerloch

== Geography ==
=== Location ===
Sommerloch lies 12 km northwest of Bad Kreuznach in the vicinity of the Nahe Valley, on the edge of the Soonwalds. The village is surrounded by vineyards. Seven wineries grow about 100 hectares of vines, primarily Riesling grapes. This wine region is not far from the "middle" Rhine River, just 25 km from Bingen am Rhein or 33 km from Ingelheim am Rhein.

In the town on Weinbergstraße (Wine Mountain Street) is Saint Aegidius Roman Catholic church built in 1789.

Nearby villages include Sankt Katharinen, Braunweiler and Wallhausen.

== History ==
=== A valley, not a summer hole ===
In the 1158 Sommerloch was mentioned as managed by the Rupert Monastery of Bingen. In the first documents, the area was noted as "Sumerlachen". Later the location was ruled by the Herrschaft Dalberg.

The name originally referred to the location as being a wet basin or a wet valley. Today the village is situated in the pleasant Nahe valley surrounded by hills planted with rows of grapes.

The Schünemann house also belongs to Sommerloch.

The German newsmedia term Sommerloch refers to a boring time in the summer when news is lacking.

Alternatively, the popular translation of the German word Sommerloch is in English "silly season".

Year	Population
1815	175
1835	268
1871	233
1905	261
1939	264

Year	Population
1950	319
1961	331
1970	349
1987	386
2005	434
2011	430
2017	417
2023	388

=== Religion ===
The population of Sommerloch is mostly Roman Catholic. Saint Aegidius is the only church in the village; built in 1789. The church is managed by the church staff of nearby Wallhausen.

St Aegidius Church Interior

=== Council and Mayor ===
The Sommerloch council consists of eight council members. The members are voluntary; the mayor is the council chairman.

Local mayor is Bernard Boos since 2024.

== Business and infrastructure ==
In the south is the Federal Highway 41. In the nearby town of Bad Kreuznach is a station of the railway Bingen-Saarbrücken.

The largest employer of Sommerloch is HUM-Festerbau.

Industrial Park - includes HUM-Festerbau

== Literature ==
- K. Eckes: The history of the village of Sommerloch and its church. In: 200 years St. Ägidius. Sommerloch 1789 to 1989. Sommerloch 1989, pp. 9–36.

== See also ==
- A list of Cultural Monuments in Sommerloch (German language)
