= Rüdesheim (Verbandsgemeinde) =

- Verbandsgemeinde
- Location of Rüdesheim within Bad Kreuznach district
- Interactive map of Rüdesheim
- Location within Germany Location within Rhineland-Palatinate
- Coordinates: 49°51′N 7°49′E
- Country: Germany
- State: Rhineland-Palatinate
- District: Bad Kreuznach
- Seat: Rüdesheim an der Nahe
- Subdivisions: 32 municipalities

Area
  - Total: 197.31 km^{2} (76.18 sq mi)

Population (2025-12-31)
  - Total: 29,114
  - Density: 147.55/km^{2} (382.16/sq mi)
- Time zone: UTC+01:00 (CET)
  - Summer (DST): UTC+02:00 (CEST)
- Website: www.vg-ruedesheim.de

Rüdesheim is a Verbandsgemeinde ("collective municipality") in the district of Bad Kreuznach, Rhineland-Palatinate, Germany. The seat of the Verbandsgemeinde is in Rüdesheim an der Nahe.

The Verbandsgemeinde Rüdesheim consists of the following Ortsgemeinden ("local municipalities"):

1. Allenfeld
2. Argenschwang
3. Bockenau
4. Boos
5. Braunweiler
6. Burgsponheim
7. Dalberg
8. Duchroth
9. Gebroth
10. Gutenberg
11. Hargesheim
12. Hergenfeld
13. Hüffelsheim
14. Mandel
15. Münchwald
16. Niederhausen
17. Norheim
18. Oberhausen an der Nahe
19. Oberstreit
20. Roxheim
21. Rüdesheim an der Nahe
22. Sankt Katharinen
23. Schloßböckelheim
24. Sommerloch
25. Spabrücken
26. Spall
27. Sponheim
28. Traisen
29. Waldböckelheim
30. Wallhausen
31. Weinsheim
32. Winterbach
