= Weinsheim, Bad Kreuznach =

Weinsheim
- Municipality
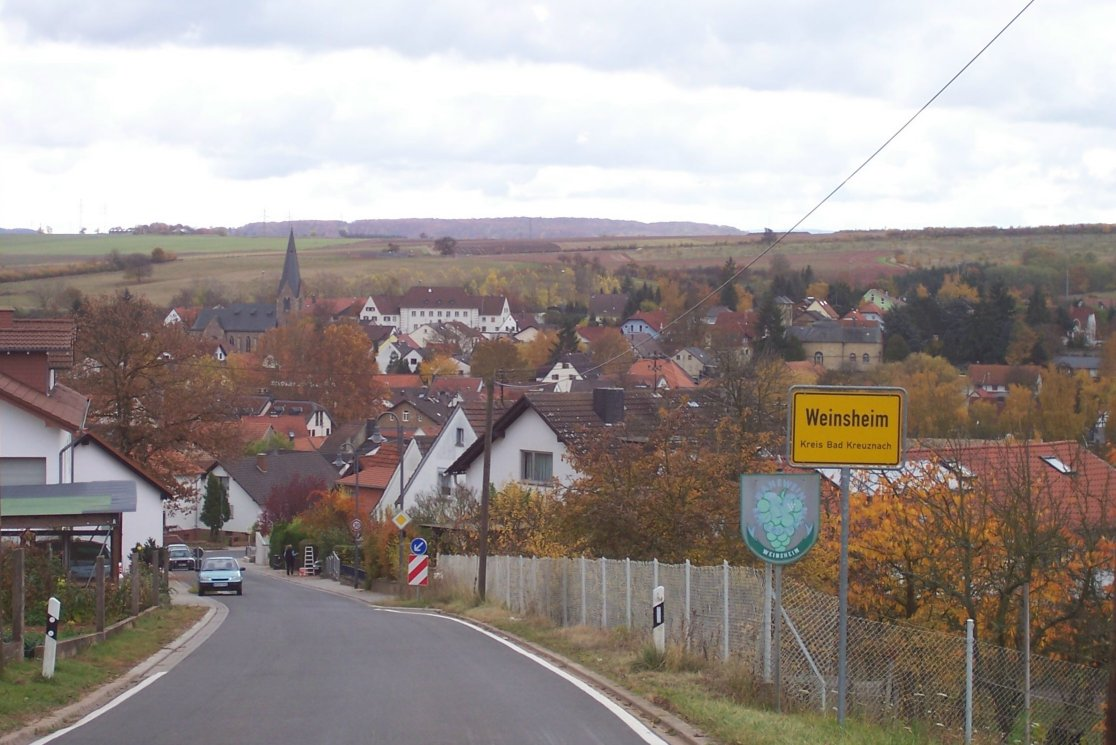

- Coat of arms

- Location of Weinsheim within Bad Kreuznach district
- Interactive map of Weinsheim
- Location within Germany Location within Rhineland-Palatinate
- Coordinates: 49°50′15″N 7°46′01″E
- Country: Germany
- State: Rhineland-Palatinate
- District: Bad Kreuznach
- Municipal assoc.: Rüdesheim

Government
  - Mayor (2019–24): Heiko Schmitt (CDU)

Area
  - Total: 9.29 km^{2} (3.59 sq mi)
- Elevation: 189 m (620 ft)

Population (2025-12-31)
  - Total: 1,734
  - Density: 187/km^{2} (483/sq mi)
- Time zone: UTC+01:00 (CET)
  - Summer (DST): UTC+02:00 (CEST)
- Postal codes: 55595
- Dialling codes: 06758
- Vehicle registration: KH
- Website: www.weinsheim.de

Weinsheim (German pronunciation: [ˈvaɪnshaɪm]) is a municipality in the district of Bad Kreuznach in Rhineland-Palatinate, in western Germany.

== Notable people ==
- Schnuckenack Reinhardt, gypsy jazz musician
- Angelina Vogt, German Wine Queen 2019/2020
