= Rüdesheim an der Nahe =

Rüdesheim
- Municipality
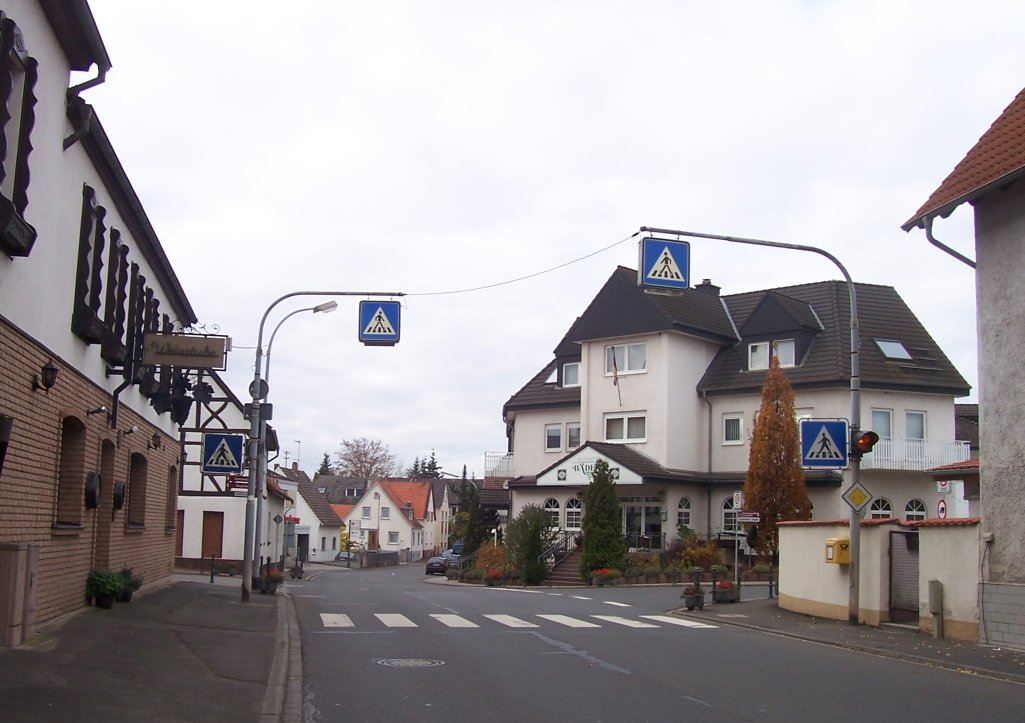
- Rüdesheim an der Nahe in November 2007

- Coat of arms

- Location of Rüdesheim within Bad Kreuznach district
- Interactive map of Rüdesheim
- Location within Germany Location within Rhineland-Palatinate
- Coordinates: 49°50′42.64″N 7°48′50.86″E
- Country: Germany
- State: Rhineland-Palatinate
- District: Bad Kreuznach
- Municipal assoc.: Rüdesheim

Government
  - Mayor (2019–24): Jürgen Poppitz

Area
  - Total: 3.49 km^{2} (1.35 sq mi)
- Elevation: 135 m (443 ft)

Population (2025-12-31)
  - Total: 2,736
  - Density: 784/km^{2} (2,030/sq mi)
- Time zone: UTC+01:00 (CET)
  - Summer (DST): UTC+02:00 (CEST)
- Postal codes: 55593
- Dialling codes: 0671
- Vehicle registration: KH
- Website: ruedesheim-nahe.de

Rüdesheim an der Nahe, or simply Rüdesheim (German pronunciation: [ˈʁyːdəshaɪm]), is an Ortsgemeinde – a municipality belonging to a Verbandsgemeinde, a kind of collective municipality – in the Bad Kreuznach district in Rhineland-Palatinate, Germany. It belongs to the Verbandsgemeinde of Rüdesheim, and is also its seat. Rüdesheim customarily takes the tag “an der Nahe” to distinguish itself from nearby Rüdesheim am Rhein. Rüdesheim is laid out in state planning as a lower centre. Rüdesheim is a winegrowing village.

== Geography ==
=== Location ===
Rüdesheim lies in the transitional zone between Rhenish Hesse and the Hunsrück at the mouth of the Katzenbach, where it empties into the Ellerbach, itself a tributary to the Nahe. Although that river lies a short way outside Rüdesheim, the municipality still styles itself “an der Nahe” (“on the Nahe”) and claims that it lies im Herzen des wunderschönen Nahetals (“in the heart of the wonderfully lovely Nahe valley”). The village is found some 4 km west of the district seat of Bad Kreuznach, with which it has all but grown together into one built-up area. The village sits at an elevation of 135 m above sea level. The municipal area measures 3.47 km^{2}.

=== Neighbouring municipalities ===
Clockwise from the north, Rüdesheim an der Nahe's neighbours are the municipality of Roxheim, the town of Bad Kreuznach and the municipalities of Hüffelsheim, Weinsheim and Mandel, all of which likewise lie within the Bad Kreuznach district.

=== Constituent communities ===
Also belonging to Rüdesheim are the outlying homesteads of Lohrer Mühle, Rüdesheimer Hof and Zum Hargesheimer Pfad.

== History ==
In 747, the village now known as Rüdesheim an der Nahe was a Frankish settlement named Lefrietesheim. There is disagreement over where the village's current name comes from, with suggestions such as Rudersheim or Rodersheim (the former an apparent reference to rowing, and the latter to land clearing). Also in contention as the namesake is a knight of the House of Rüdesheim. Whoever is right, the name does come from Frankish times, like all placenames that end in —heim, —hausen, —weiler and so on. The wine was brought here by the Roman legionaries, who could call this place home even before the Franks came. For the epithet “wine village”, Rüdesheim still has the Romans to thank, even now, in the third millennium. In the years 1125 and 1126, the villagers found themselves in a fight against famine and the Plague. In 1334, Rüdesheim, along with Bockenau, Weinsheim and Sponheim, was burnt to the ground in the feud between Archbishop of Trier Baldwin of Luxembourg and the Counts of Sponheim. During the Thirty Years' War, the village had to deal with military requisitions, plundering and deliberately set blazes. In the wake of all this, the village's population sank to roughly half what it had been by the time the war ended. The first sewerage was laid in Rüdesheim at the early date of 1661. The French Revolution, too, left its mark on Rüdesheim. In 1794, the village was occupied by French Revolutionary troops. On 1 October 1795, the German lands on the Rhine’s left bank were annexed to the French First Republic, French became the official language and the operative constitution was the French one. Schinderhannes (or Johannes Bückler, to use his true name) supposedly amused himself at the inn “Zum Krönchen” during this time. After Napoleon’s defeat and the delivery of the terms of the Congress of Vienna, Rüdesheim passed in 1814 or 1815 to joint Austrian-Bavarian rule. In 1853, the seat of the Amtsbürgermeisterei (“Amt mayoralty”) was established. The Amtsbürgermeistereien of Rüdesheim, Wallhausen, Winterburg and Waldböckelheim all took part in 1893 in the planning for the narrow-gauge railway. Besides passengers, this railway also transported wood from the Soonwald, ore, brownstone and material from the Bockenau quarries. The narrow-gauge railway ran through Rüdesheim along the Ellerbach. The right-of-way is now a street called “Im Wiesengrunde”. The railway station stood at “Am Kesselberg 8” (at the corner of “Im Wiesengrunde”). At the beginning of the First World War, this report came from Rüdesheim:

It was a sweltering August day in the year 1914. In the evening, the whole village gathered in the street. A celebratory calm prevailed. The chairmen of the clubs spoke and all enthusiastically agreed to the Kaiserhoch (a cheer). There was a parting celebration taking place for the men who were going off to the war. The next morning, one could see at the narrow-gauge railway station parting scenes.

In the years that followed, 254 Russian prisoners of war were assigned to agricultural work in the Rüdesheim Bürgermeisterei (“mayoralty”) region. The time that followed generally brought social and economic hardship, currency devaluation, sometimes famine and coal shortages, and bartering flourished. In the Second World War, many evacuees came from the Saar to Rüdesheim. Other things that locals had to deal with throughout the war were aerial defence measures, collecting drives, receiving ration cards, standing in queues for groceries and other everyday needs, air-raid alerts, searching for potato beetles, collecting scrap, news from the war, funeral services for the fallen and so on. The swimming pool was opened in 1939. During the approach to an air raid on Bad Kreuznach, bombs were accidentally dropped on Rüdesheim. When American tanks rolled through Rüdesheim on 16 March 1945, the village found itself under American occupation. The “Economic Miracle” that set in after the war also made itself felt in Rüdesheim: In 1963, sewerage was laid throughout the village. Also that year, a new school building was dedicated on Schulstraße. A kindergarten, too, was opened. New building zones were laid out as well. On 7 June 1969, in the course of administrative restructuring in Rhineland-Palatinate, Rüdesheim was amalgamated with the town of Bad Kreuznach. The town wanted to expand its industrial park, but Rüdesheimers were mostly against this proposal. Rüdesheim therefore took the state of Rhineland-Palatinate to court. The Constitutional Court (Verfassungsgerichtshof) found in Rüdesheim's favour on 17 December 1969, and the amalgamation was overturned, splitting the village away from the town once again. In 1970, the old Amtsbürgermeisterei became the Verbandsgemeinde of Rüdesheim. In 1994, the Bundesstraße 41 bypass was dedicated.

=== Population development ===
Rüdesheim an der Nahe's population development since Napoleonic times is shown in the table below. The figures for the years from 1871 to 1987 are drawn from census data:

Year	Inhabitants
1815	204
1835	371
1871	451
1905	550
1939	689

Year	Inhabitants
1950	834
1961	1,196
1970	1,539
1987	2,115
2005	2,358

== Religion ==
As at 31 December 2013, there are 2,614 full-time residents in Rüdesheim an der Nahe, and of those, 1,200 are Evangelical (45.907%), 774 are Catholic (29.61%), 2 are Greek Orthodox (0.077%), 1 belongs to a free religious community (0.038%), 1 is Russian Orthodox (0.038%), 131 (5.011%) belong to other religious groups and 505 (19.319%) either have no religion or will not reveal their religious affiliation.

== Politics ==
=== Municipal council ===
The council is made up of 16 council members, who were elected by proportional representation at the municipal election held on 7 June 2009, and the honorary mayor as chairman. The municipal election held on 7 June 2009 yielded the following results:

Year	SPD	CDU	FWG	FBL	Total
2009	3	3	1	9	16 seats
2004	3	3	1	9	16 seats

=== Mayor ===
Rüdesheim's mayor is Jürgen Poppitz (Freie Bürgerliste Rüdesheim), and his deputies are Heinz-Herbert Stephan (Freie Bürgerliste Rüdesheim), Willi Kurz (SPD) and Ekkehard Schwabe (CDU).

=== Coat of arms ===
The municipality's arms might be described thus: Gules on ground vert a horse passant argent, riding him Saint Martin of Tours of the same cutting his mantle azure with a sword sable, kneeling on the ground to sinister a beggar man of the third.

This scene from Saint Martin's life appears in many German civic coats of arms. Indeed, Rüdesheim an der Nahe's arms are not even the only ones in the Bad Kreuznach district to bear this image, with Meddersheim and Norheim likewise bearing arms depicting Martin cutting off a piece of his cloak for a beggar. The arms have been borne since the Rhineland-Palatinate Ministry of the Interior approved them on 5 October 1950, and are based on a court seal from 1569. In villages in this region back in Frankish times, the village court or the Schultheiß bore a seal beginning about the 14th century. The main state archive in Koblenz has two stamps made by Rüdesheim court seals, one on a document from 31 December 1569, and the other from 1731. Depicted on both is Saint Martin, who was Sponheim Abbey's patron saint. The circumscriptions on each, however, are different, namely “GER.SIG.RUEDESHEIM BEI XNACH” and “GER.SIG RIDESHEIM BEY XNACH” respectively, although both mean “court seal Rüdesheim near Kreuznach” (“Xnach” was an abbreviation for “Kreuznach” because the first syllable of that name is German for “cross”, hence the X). Saint Martin, also patron saint of the Sponheim church, was adopted as the main charge in the coat of arms in 1950. Nevertheless, nobody thought much about what tinctures should be applied. The Counts of Sponheim bore arms chequy azure and Or (a chequered field of alternating blue and gold squares), and although this pattern does appear in many local civic coats of arms (Hargesheim and Roxheim, for instance), it does not appear in Rüdesheim's arms, even though the Counts were the local lords in the Middle Ages.

== Culture and sightseeing ==
=== Buildings ===
The following are listed buildings or sites in Rhineland-Palatinate’s Directory of Cultural Monuments:

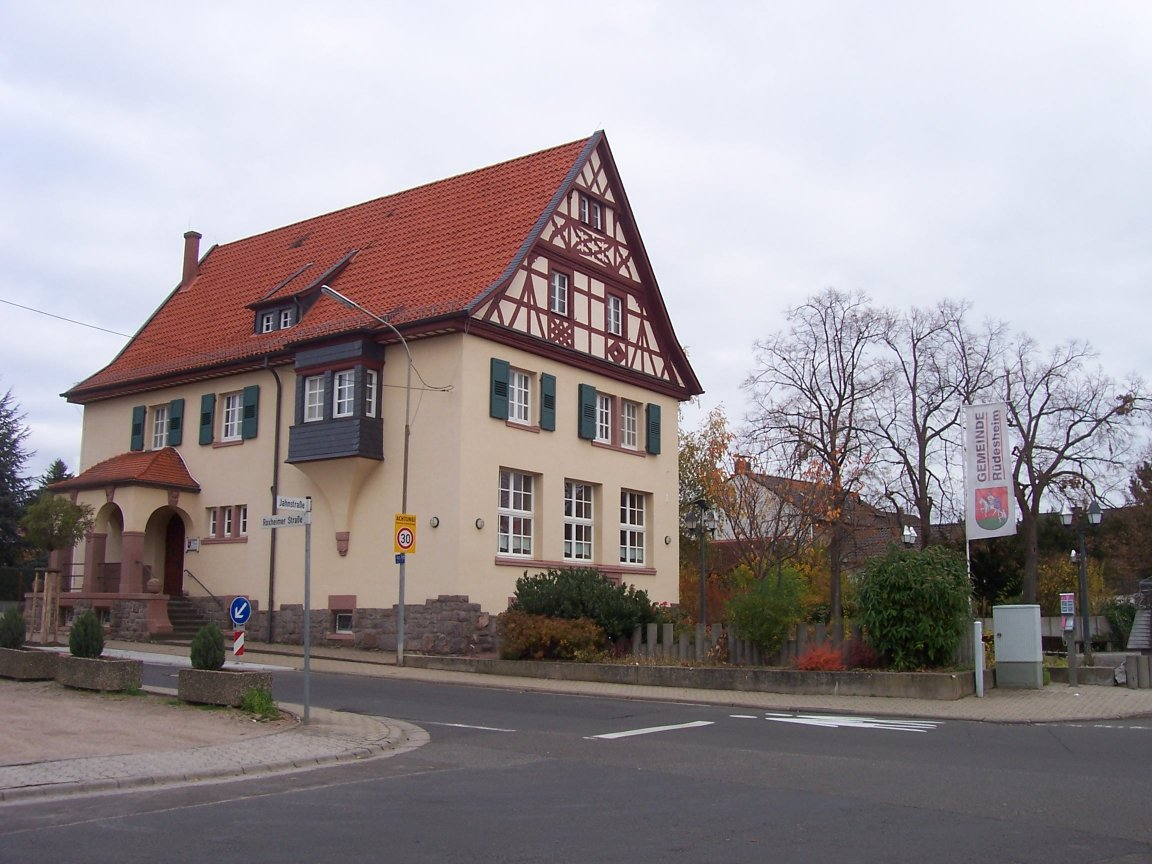
Roxheimer Straße 2 – former school

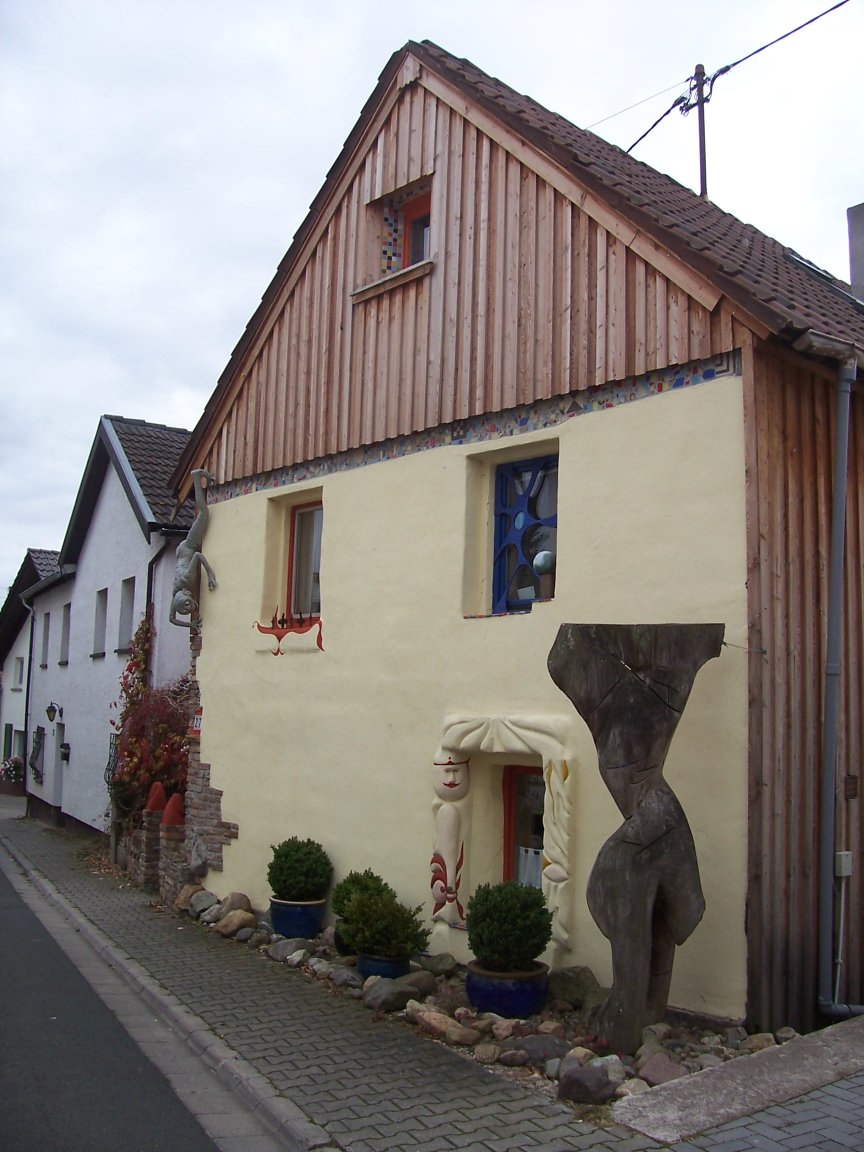
House in Rüdesheim an der Nahe

- Evangelical church, Nahestraße 36 – formerly Saint George’s (St. Georg), Late Gothic aisleless church, made over in Baroque, marked 1743 and 1898 (repair work), bell tower after 1945
- Kurt-Schumacher-Straße 1 – Baroque timber-frame house, from the earlier half of the 18th century
- Nahestraße – warriors’ memorial 1914–1918, display wall with relief, Neoclassical and Expressionist style elements, 1922, sculptor Arthur Zimmermann, Bad Kreuznach
- Nahestraße 30 – Baroque timber-frame house, marked 1699
- Nahestraße 58 – villa, partly timber-frame, Art Nouveau 1906, architect Zimmermann
- Roxheimer Straße 2 – former school; Heimatstil, wall fountain, about 1920/1930
- Schäferstraße 1 – Baroque timber-frame house, plastered, early 18th century
- Schäferstraße 15 – Baroque estate complex with smithy, 18th and 19th centuries

=== Clubs ===
The following clubs are active in Rüdesheim an der Nahe:

- Classic Automobile Rüdesheim/Nahe (C.A.R.) — “oldtimers’ club”
- Gesangverein 1888 Rüdesheim e.V. — singing club
- Rüdesheimer Freizeitclub e.V. (RFC) — leisure club
- Tanzsportverein Rüdesheim — dancesport club
- Turnverein Rüdesheim 1902 e.V. — gymnastic club
- VdK-Orstverband — social advocacy group local chapter
- VFL Rüdesheim 1922 e.V. — sport club
- Verein der Freunde der Feuerwehr e.V. — fire brigade promotional association

== Economy and infrastructure ==
=== Transport ===
Running through Rüdesheim an der Nahe's municipal area is Bundesstraße 41, and running through the village itself are Landesstraße 236 and Kreisstraße 98, which is met by Kreisstraße 52 in the village's west end. Bundesstraße 41 affords drivers quick access to neighbouring Bad Kreuznach and to the Autobahn A 61 (Koblenz–Ludwigshafen) just beyond. Serving neighbouring Bad Kreuznach is a railway station. Branching off the Nahe Valley Railway (Bingen–Saarbrücken) here is the railway line to Gau Algesheim. From Bingen am Rhein, Regionalbahn trains run by way of the Alsenz Valley Railway, which branches off the Nahe Valley Railway in Bad Münster am Stein, to Kaiserslautern, reaching it in roughly 65 minutes. Running on the line to Saarbrücken and by way of Gau Algesheim and the West Rhine Railway to Mainz are Regional-Express and Regionalbahn trains. The travel time to Mainz lies between 25 and 40 minutes, and to Saarbrücken between 1 hour and 40 minutes and 2 hours and 20 minutes.

=== Education ===
Rüdesheim an der Nahe has a daycare centre with five groups and a primary school (Grundschule am Rosengarten). Further education for those moving beyond primary school is available in neighbouring Bad Kreuznach.

=== Public institutions ===
Rüdesheim an der Nahe has a public swimming pool, a community centre, a municipal library and a retirement community. There are several medical and dental practices in the village.

=== Winegrowing ===
The following wineries (Weingüter) can be found in Rüdesheim an der Nahe:

- Weingut Bäder G.
- Weingut Bäder Jakob + Sohn
- Weingut Hahn
- Weingut Herrmann U.
- Weingut Weinhotel Bäder
- Weingut Welker-Emmerich

=== Established businesses ===
As would be expected in a place of Rüdesheim's size, with well over 2,500 inhabitants, there is a full range of different businesses on hand besides the wineries mentioned above. There are several shopping centres, a bakery, restaurants, inns and Straußwirtschaften, along with craft and service businesses.

=== New building zone ===
Rüdesheim has announced the laying-out of a new residential building zone, “In den sechs Morgen–In den Steinchesäcker”, which will offer 101 lots for houses.
