= Naheland =

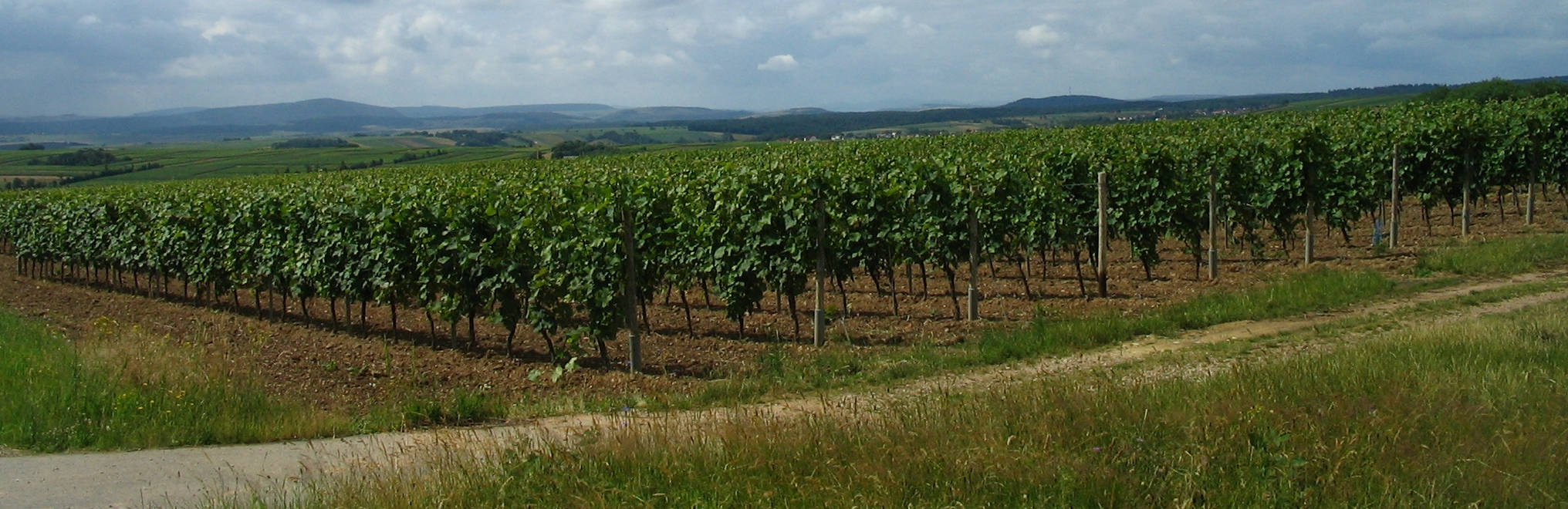
View of the Naheland

The Naheland is the landscape on either side of the river Nahe in the German state of Rhineland-Palatinate.

== Geography ==
The southern foothills of the Hunsrück and the northern North Palatine Uplands on either side of the Nahe are both described as the "Naheland". The Naheland extends for about 80 km from west to east from the source of the river in the Saarland to its mouth on the Rhine in the town of Bingen. Whilst the narrow strip of land in the west is covered by woods and agricultural land, vineyards of the Nahe wine region dominate the wider eastern section.

== Counties ==
The Naheland lies in the two counties of Birkenfeld and Bad Kreuznach.

== Culture ==
Naheland has a musical culture consisting of many choirs, wind orchestras, big bands and specialised music groups. Many professional musicians come from this part of the world or work here.

== Transport ==
The main transport axes of the region run parallel to the Nahe. The B 41 federal road and the non-electrified rail service on the Nahe Valley Railway are of statewide significance.

== Tourism ==
The term "Naheland" (formerly: "Nahegau") is now increasingly used in the marketing of the region for tourism purposes; Naheland's tourist office being in Kirn. For ramblers there are nine circular walks, the so-called "vital tours".
