= Boppard Hauptbahnhof =

Railway station in western Germany

Boppard Hbf
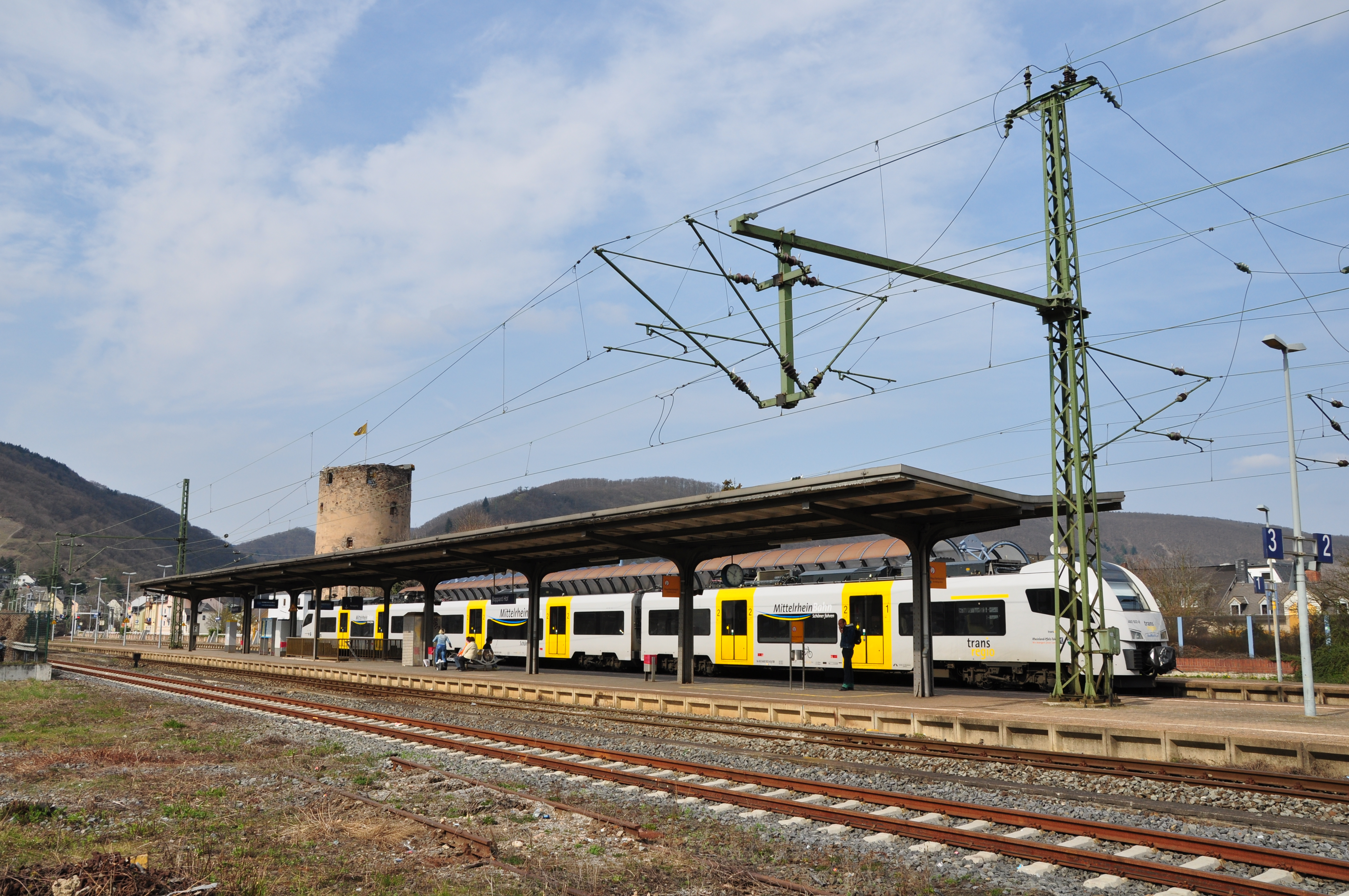

General information
- Location: Boppard, Rhineland-Palatinate; Germany
- Coordinates: 50°13′53″N 07°35′09″E
- Lines: West Rhine Railway (110.7 km) (KBS 470, KBS 471); Hunsrück Railway (52.8 km) (KBS 479)
- Platforms: 3

Construction
- Accessible: Platform 1 only

Other information
- Station code: 776
- DS100 code: KBOP
- IBNR: 8000045
- Category: 4
- Fare zone: VRM: 603
- Website: www.bahnhof.de

History
- Opened: 1859; 167 years ago
Services
Preceding station	DB Regio Mitte	Following station
Koblenz Hbf Terminus	RE 2 Südwest-Express	Oberwesel towards Frankfurt (Main) Hbf
Preceding station	Trans Regio	Following station
Spay towards Köln Messe/Deutz	RB 26	Boppard-Hirzenach towards Mainz Hbf
Preceding station	Transdev Germany	Following station
Boppard-Buchholz towards Emmelshausen	RB 37	Boppard-Sud Terminus
Preceding station	Vlexx	Following station
Koblenz Hbf Terminus	RE 17	Oberwesel towards Kaiserslautern Hbf
Location
- Location within Rhineland-Palatinate Location within Germany Location within Europe

Boppard Hauptbahnhof is a station in the town of Boppard in the German state of Rhineland-Palatinate. It is located on the outskirts of the town near the Rhine. It is at a railway junction on the West Rhine Railway (German: Linke Rheinstrecke) between Köln Hauptbahnhof and Mainz Hauptbahnhof, and it is the starting point of the Hunsrück Railway (Hunsrückbahn) to Emmelshausen. It has three platform tracks.

The station is classified by Deutsche Bahn as a category 4 station. Less than five of the long-distance passenger services running on the left Rhine line stop at the station each day. It is served by one Regional-Express service (stopping every two hours) and two Regionalbahn stopping services (each stopping hourly).

In addition to the main station, there are five other railway stations in Boppard.

== History ==
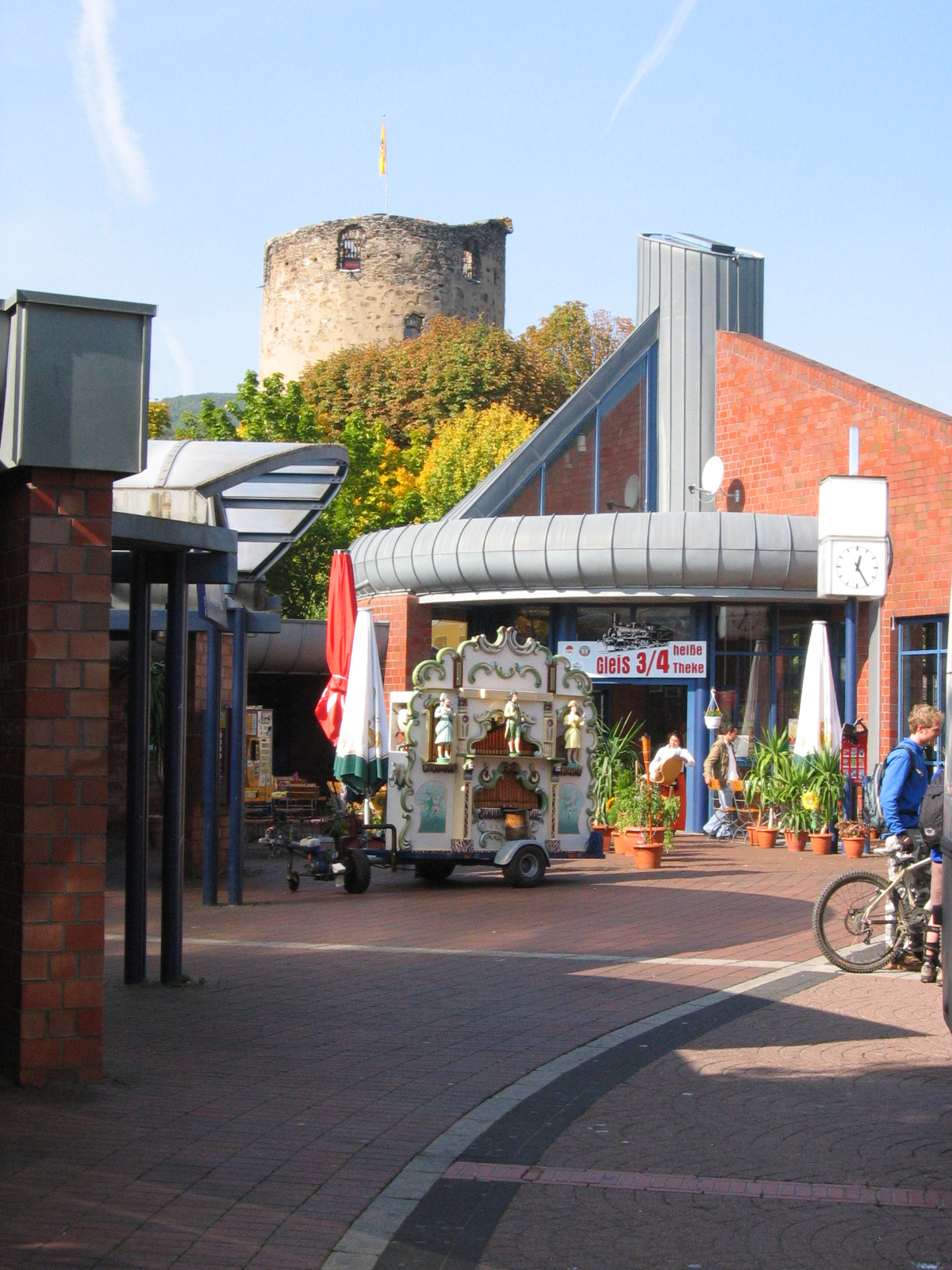
Station forecourt with the Säuerlings tower near the station

In 1854, the Rhenish Railway Company (Rheinische Eisenbahn Gesellschaft, RhE) began planning the construction of the extension of the left Rhine line from its current terminus at Rolandseck to Bingen Hauptbahnhof. At the end of 1859, the southern section of the left Rhine line was put into operation between Koblenz and Bingen. Boppard station was built at the same time and opened in 1859. Around 1903, work began to connect the Hunsrück Railway to this station. Ultimately it was decided to build a line running through today's district of Buchholz, so that the line connected to the north of Boppard station. However, the Säuerlingsturm (tower), which was part of the medieval city walls, was in the way. Therefore, between 1906 and 1908 this tower was dismantled and rebuilt with thinner walls to the north of its old position. In 1908, the line was opened. In the Boppard–Boppard-Buchholz section, the line climbs 336 metres and is still the steepest railway in Germany using adhesion only.

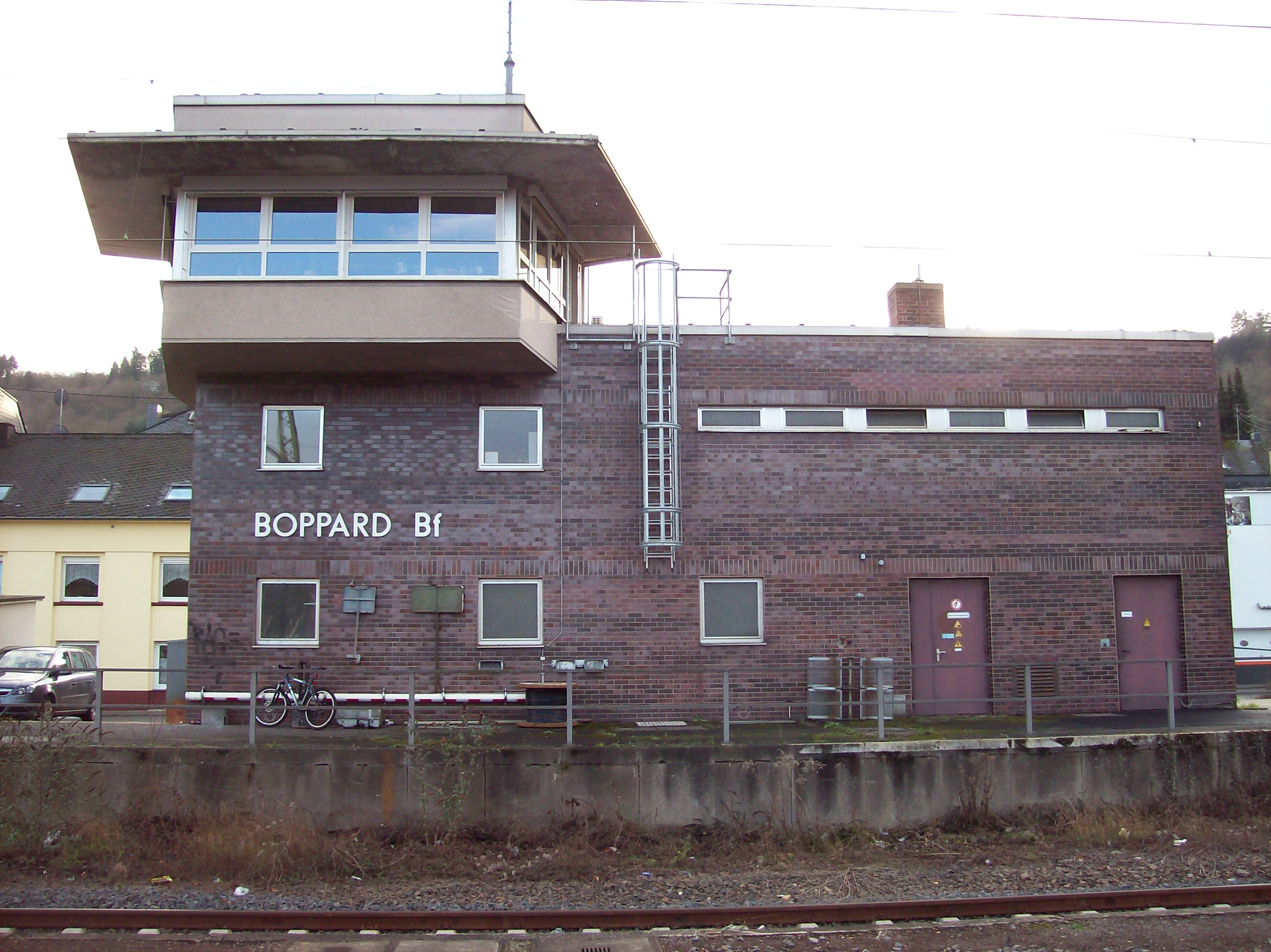
Bf signalling centre in Boppard station

An important step in achieving today's high-capacity line on the left bank of the Rhine was the modernisation of the interlocking technology in the 1970s. Pre-planning and design work for new signal installations in the Boppard area began in 1974. After about two and a half years of construction, the Boppard Bf signalling centre was put into operation on the night of 28 August 1977. It replaced mechanical signalling and safety equipment from the period before the First World War. In 1994, the new entrance building was opened in Boppard. The 1859 station building was originally left standing in accordance with a preservation order, but it had to be demolished in 1989 to permit the relocation of federal highway B 9. The handling of freight in Boppard and on the Hunsrück railway was abandoned, allowing Deutsche Bahn to dismantle the tracks and points at the station from 1998. In particular, tracks 5 and 6 and the freight handling facilities were removed. This site is now in the control of the town of Boppard and serves as a parking lot. Remnants of track 5 are still visible.

From the beginning of the summer timetable on 10 June 2001, Deutsche Bahn renamed Boppard station as Boppard Hauptbahnhof ("Boppard main station"). This was done at the initiative of Boppard Mayor Walter Bersch. At the time, Boppard also had the stations of Boppard Süd, Hirzenach, Bad Salzig, Fleckertshöhe and Buchholz, more stations than Koblenz.

The entrance building was leased in 1994 to a catering business. Customer information and ticket sales are provided by a private company.

Since the timetable change of 2009, Rhenus Veniro has been the operator of the Hunsrück railway. For this reason, Rhenus Veniro bought the old and dilapidated Bahnmeisterei (the office of the director of track maintenance) from Deutsche Bahn in 2007 and two years later built a shed there for parking and repairing its trains and a carriage washing facility. The tracks of the depot were reconnected to the Deutsche Bahn network at the station.

== Planning ==
The platforms at Boppard Hbf are accessible only by stairs, so the station is not accessible for passengers with certain disabilities. Rhineland-Palatinate has decided to make all the stations of the state accessible. For Boppard Hbf, this means that lifts will be installed and platforms will be raised from 38 or 55 to 76 cm above the top of the rails. Funds were provided in the 2011 budget to the town of Boppard for this work. In addition, Säuerlingstraße, which runs west of the station, will be remodeled and relocated, which requires that the entrance to the station be rebuilt.

== Rail services ==
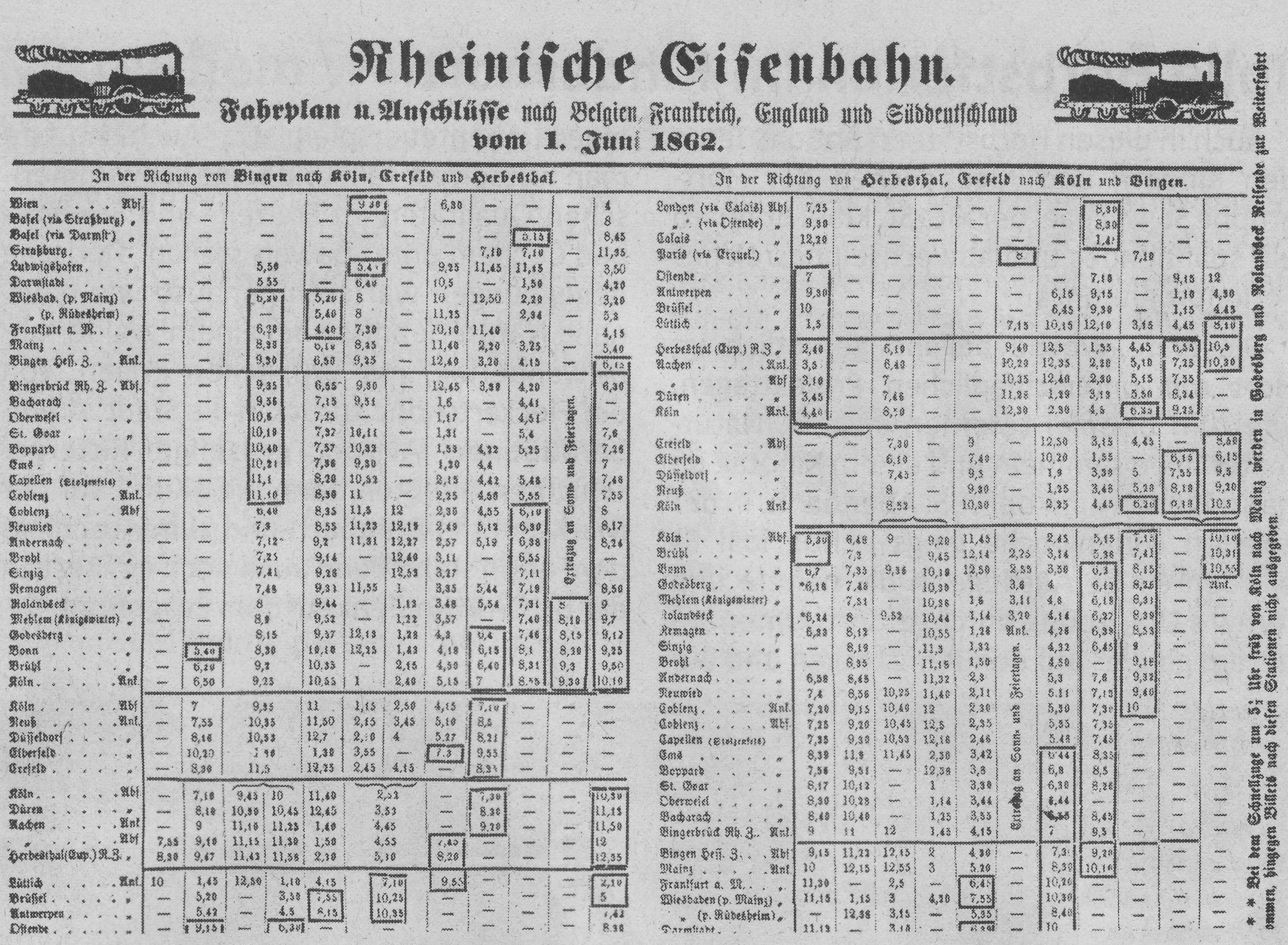
Timetable of the Rhenish Railway Company of 1862

A few long-distance services stop at Boppard station in the early morning and late at night. These make similar stops at minor stations on the route between Hamburg and Frankfurt. The Mittelrhein-Main-Express (Koblenz–Frankfurt) operated by DB Regio also stops every two hours and the MittelrheinBahn (Koblenz - Mainz) operated by trans regio stops hourly in Boppard. In the peak hours extra services run between Koblenz, Boppard and Mainz. At the timetable change in December 2010, transregio took over its services from Deutsche Bahn. In addition, Transdev Germany operates the Hunsrück Railway between Emmelshausen and Boppard Hbf or Boppard Süd.

Line	Name	Route	Frequency
RE 2	SÜWEX	Koblenz – Boppard – Bingen (Rhein) – Mainz – Frankfurt Airport (regional) – Frankfurt (Main) Hbf	120 min extra services in peak
RE 17		Koblenz – Boppard – Bingen – Bad Kreuznach – Kaiserslautern	120 min
RB 26	MittelrheinBahn	Cologne – Bonn – Remagen – Andernach – Koblenz – Boppard – Oberwesel – Bingen (Rhein) – Ingelheim – Mainz	60 min
RB 37	Hunsrückbahn	Emmelshausen – Boppard-Buchholz – Boppard Hbf (– Boppard Süd)	60 min

In the second half of 2008 Boppard Hbf handled on average 7,221 train passengers a week. Several bus lines also operate from Boppard Hbf. Bus route 650 runs between Boppard and Koblenz and route 611 connects the southern parts of the town of Boppard. Other buses stop at the station only irregularly.

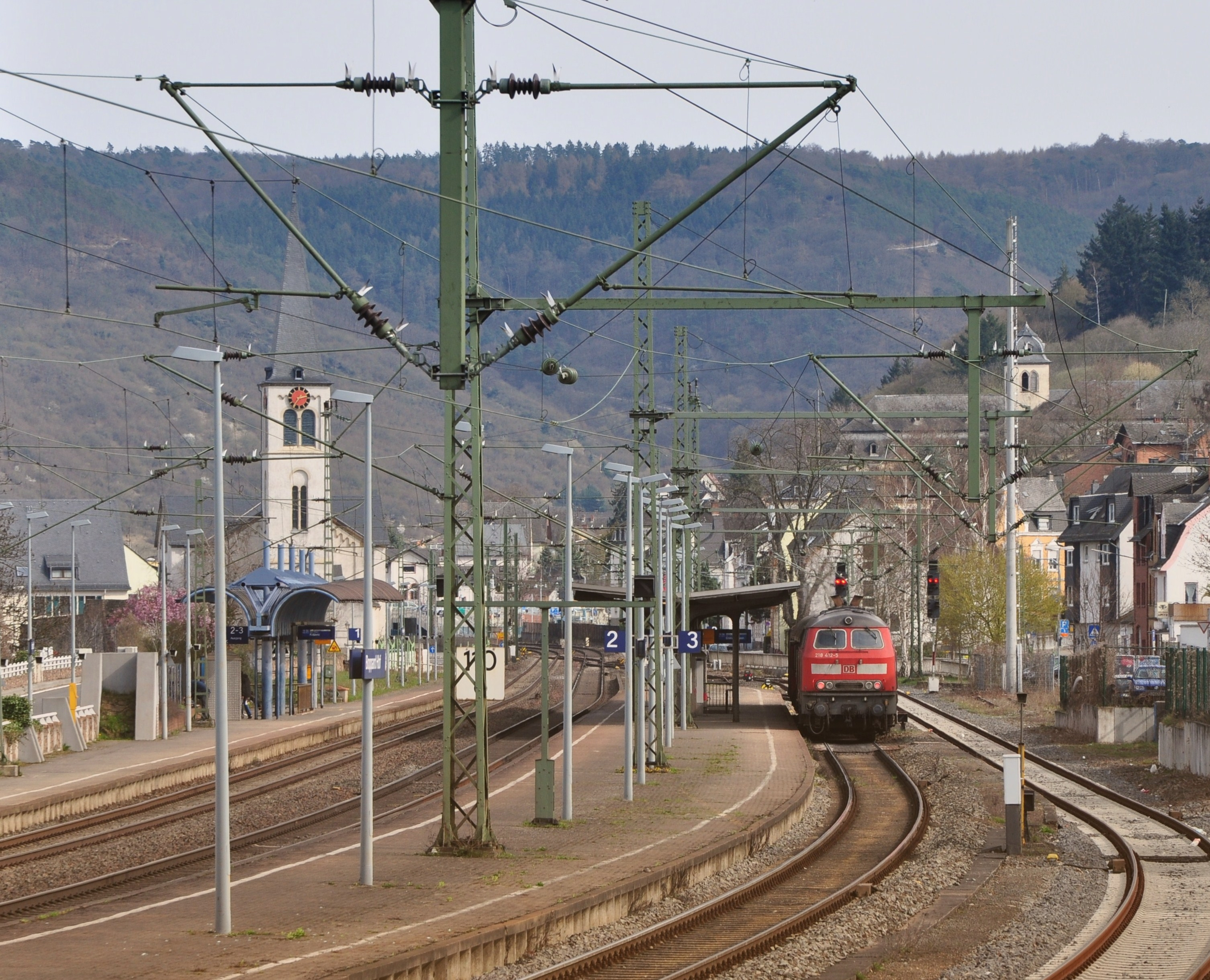
The station with a class 218 locomotive

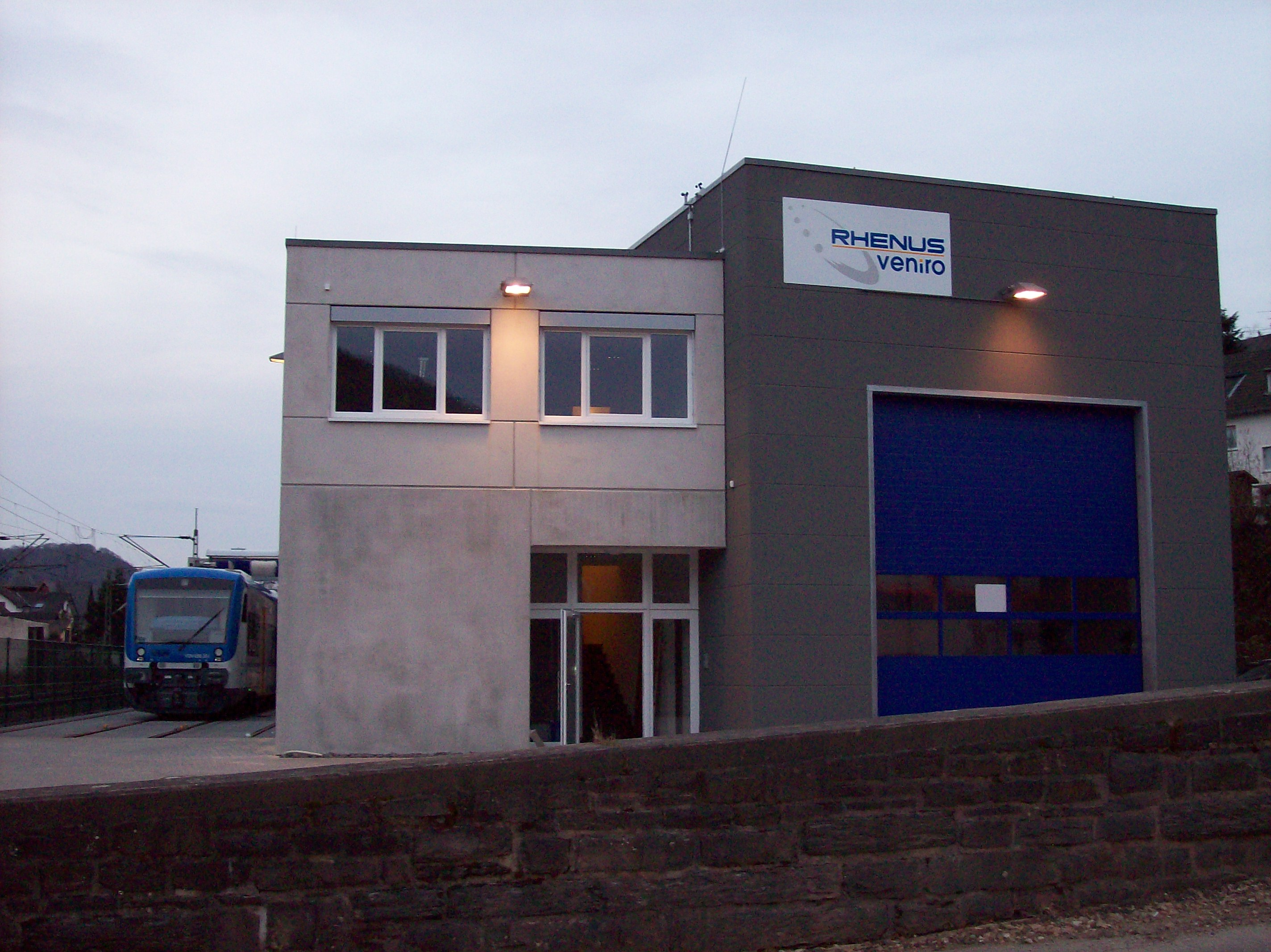
Premises of Rhenus Veniro

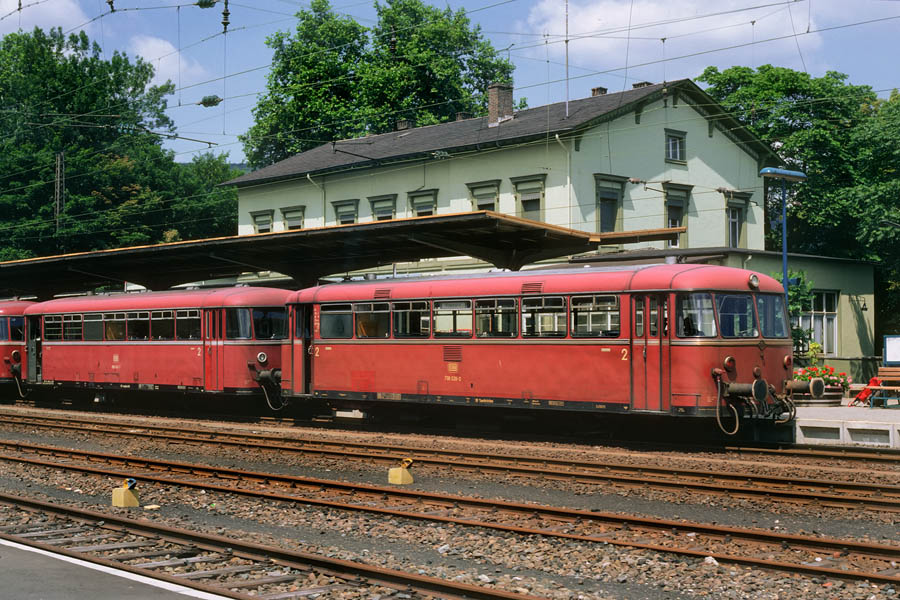
The station in the 1970s
