= Hunsrück Railway =

Railway branch line in Germany

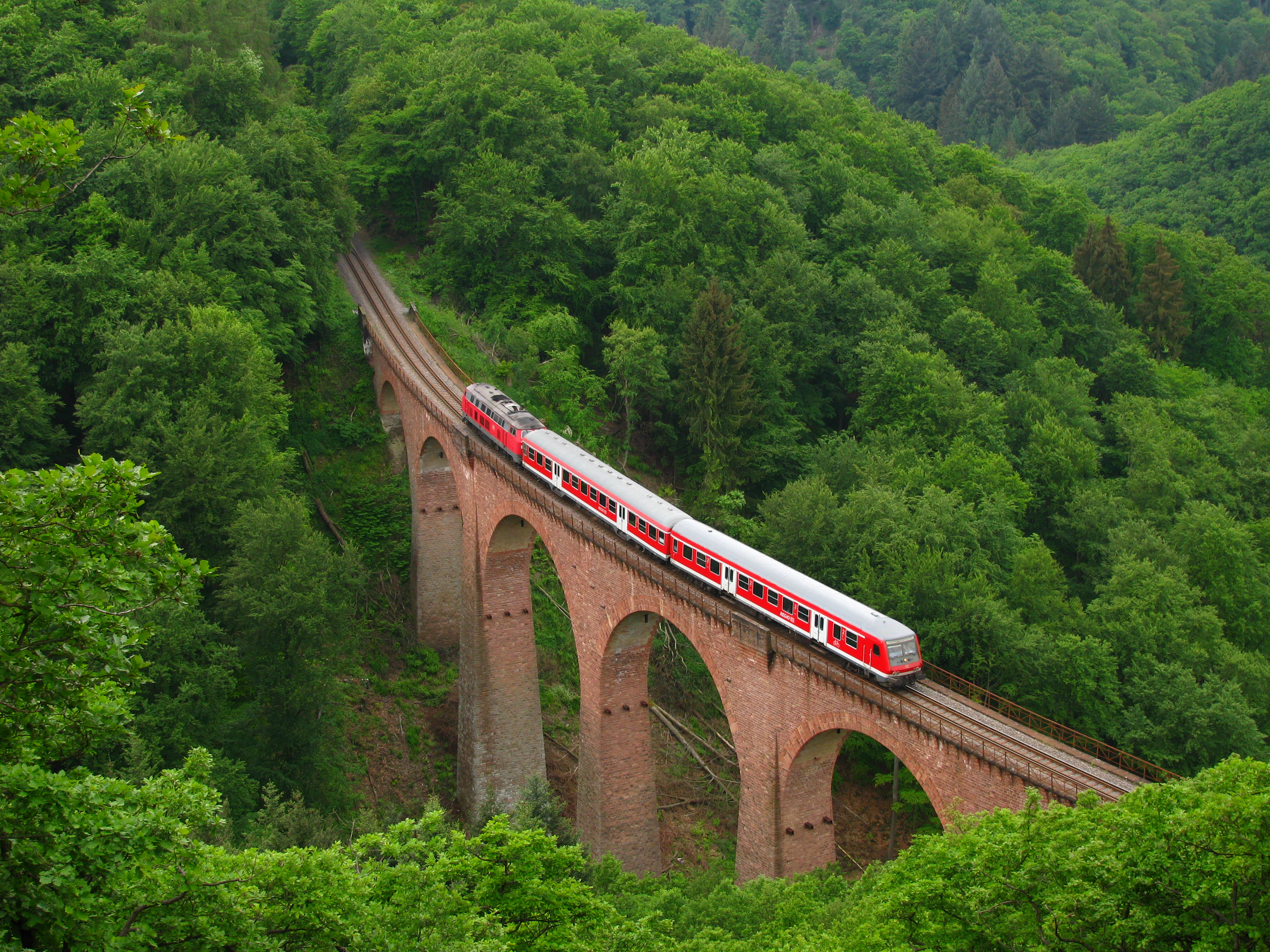
- DB Regio push–pull train on Hubertus Viaduct

Overview
- Native name: Hunsrückbahn
- Line number: 3020
- Locale: Rhineland-Palatinate
- Termini: Simmern (original) Emmelshausen (operational); Boppard Süd

Service
- Route number: 479

Technical
- Line length: 53.5 km (33.2 mi)
- Rack system: Abt (until 1931)
- Track gauge: 1,435 mm (4 ft 8 1/2 in) standard gauge
- Maximum incline: 6.09%

The Hunsrück Railway (German: Hunsrückbahn) is a partially disused railway branch line in the German state of Rhineland-Palatinate, which branches from the West Rhine Railway in Boppard and used to run as far as Simmern. The 38 kilometre section south of Emmelshausen has been dismantled and has been since replaced by the Schinderhannes-Radweg cycle path. In Simmern it connected with the now partially closed Hunsrückquerbahn (Trans-Hunsrück Railway) between Langenlonsheim and Hermeskeil.

On the 15 kilometre-long Boppard–Emmelshausen section there are regular local services operated by Rhenus Veniro as route RB 37. Many school students from Emmelshausen and Boppard-Buchholz rely on the trains and their travel was facilitated by the extension of the line from Boppard Central Station to Boppard Süd station.

== Name of the line ==
The name Hunsrückbahn was given to this line only after the closure of passenger services on another line that was originally called the Hunsrückbahn, which runs between Langenlonsheim and Hermeskeil. These original Hunsrückbahn is now called the Hunsrückquerbahn (literally meaning the “Trans-Hunsrück Railway”) to distinguish them (especially since the development of Hahn Airport).

== History ==
The railway was opened in August 1908. Three years were spent building the last section between Boppard and Kastellaun. Not only the steep route between Boppard and Buchholz, but also the line through the front ridge of the Hunsrück required a high standard of technology and a substantial workforce. There were some deaths in the construction of the Hunsrück Railway. The most serious accident occurred on 4 January 1907 in the drilling of the tunnel between Leiningen and Lamscheid when a worker was crushed by a landslide. While colleagues and volunteers searched for him, more earth slipped, killing another twelve. There is a memorial at the disaster site to the 13 dead.

On the steep route between Boppard and Boppard-Buchholz, including two viaducts and five tunnels, which was opened in 1907, the line was operated until 1931 as a rack railway with Abt rack. Prussian locomotives of class T 26 were used. This was followed by adhesive operations with class 94.5 steam locomotives, which lasted until May 1956. From May 1956 until the closure of the Emmelshausen–Simmern section, the whole line was operated by class VT 98 Uerdingen railbuses (from 1968: class 798) with special equipment for the steep haul operations.

=== Partial closure ===
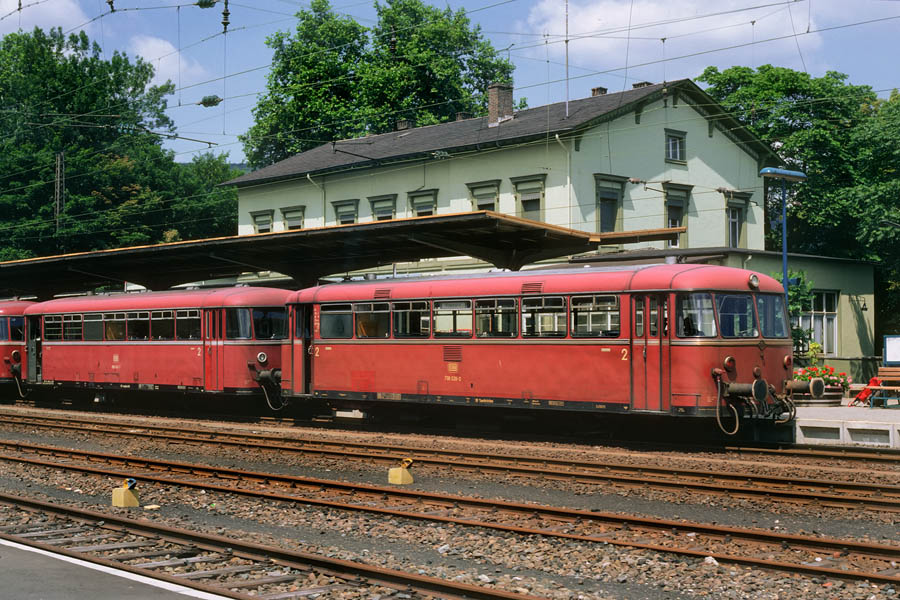
Uerdingen railbus in front of the old Boppard station in the 1970s

Passenger services between Simmern and Pfalzfeld were abandoned on 29 May 1983. There was a brief renaissance of passenger operations on the Simmern–Kastellaun section on 11 October 1986, when there was big demonstration against the planned stationing of cruise missiles near Kastellaun and a series of special trains operated on that section. Freight operations were closed between Emmelshausen and Pfalzfeld on 27 May 1983. Freight operated between Kastellaun and Pfalzfeld until 31 December 1994 and between Simmern and Kastellaun until 1 June 1995. On 1 March 1996, the Simmern–Pfalzfeld section was closed. In the years since 1998, the section has been gradually dismantled and the Schinderhannes cycle path was built on the Emmelshausen–Simmern route, which is very popular with cyclists, skaters and walkers.

With the restriction on operations to the Boppard–Emmelshausen section in 1983, services were operated for the first time with class 213 diesel locomotives hauling two Silberling carriages, one of which was equipped with a control compartment. The use of the class 213 locomotives lasted until 1995, when all ten locomotives were withdrawn and transferred for use on the Plaue–Themar railway in Thuringia. It was initially replaced by class 215 locomotives and later by the class 218 diesels. In addition to the class 218 diesel locomotives, a modernised Silberling intermediate carriage began operations on 15 April 2011 and a driving trailer of class Bybdzf (also known as a Wittenberg control car) is used.

The operation with heavy diesels was not without problems. At the end of 2005, operations had to be suspended for a few weeks because of damage to the tracks and to the wheel sets. This is possibly the result of using 80-ton and 2060 kW locomotives on the tight curves of this steep section. By increasing the wheel flange lubrication and after the installation of rail wheel flange lubrication systems services were restarted.

In 2008, the line was completely renovated. The DB Netz AG invested €9.3 million on the line to completely replace the old tracks and sleepers. After the renovation in August 2008, wear recurred on the wheel sets, causing the discontinuation of traffic in order to research the cause for several months until 16 February 2009.

=== Change of operator ===
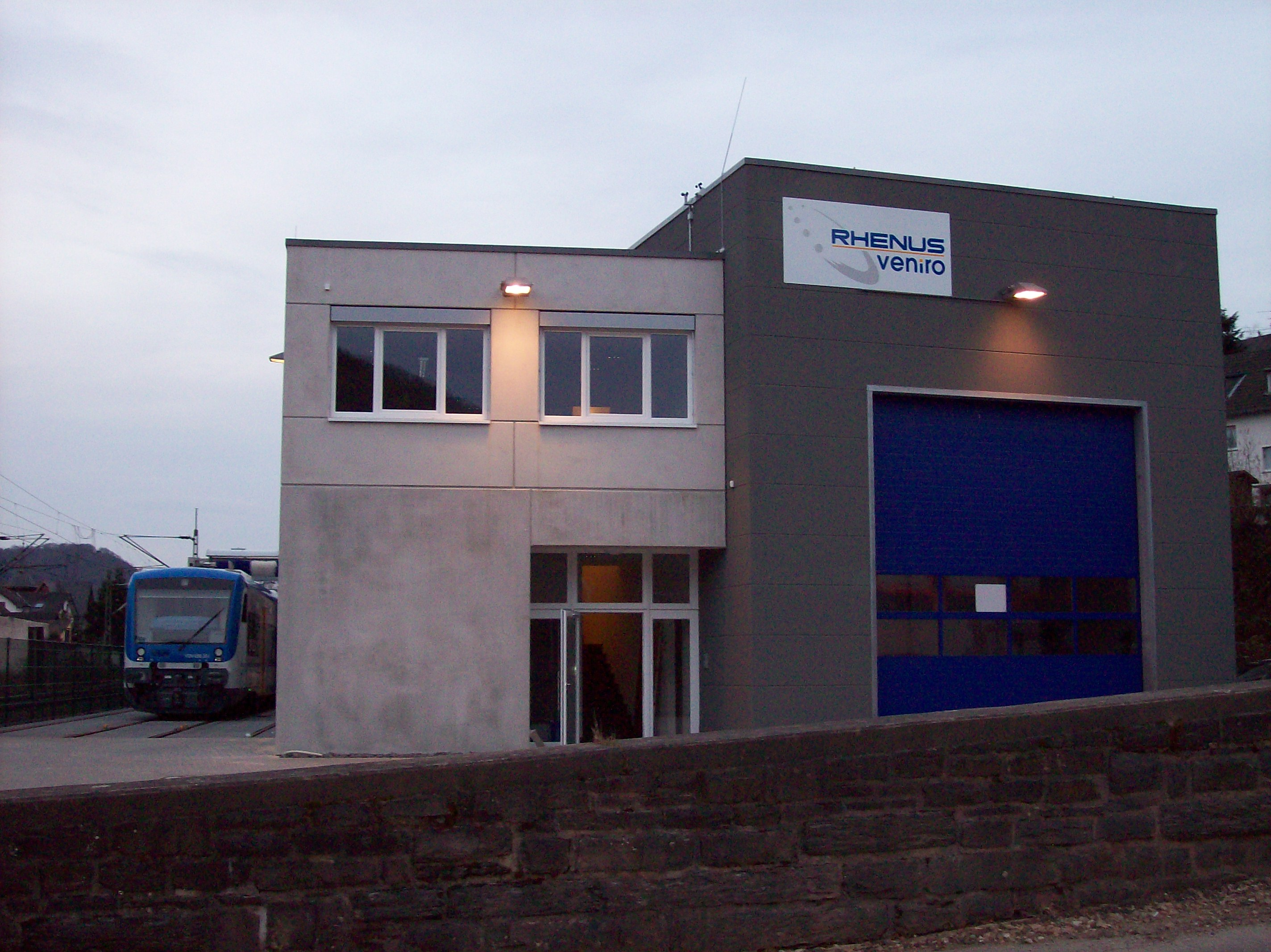
Workshop of Rhenus Veniro in Boppard, one of the three Regio-Shuttle sets to the left

Rhenus Veniro was contracted to take over passenger operations on the Hunsrück railway at the timetable change in December 2009. The Public Transport Association of Rhineland-Palatinate North (Zweckverband SchienenPersonenNahVerkehr Rheinland-Pfalz Nord) in Koblenz had awarded the company the contract for its operation in February 2008. The contract is for a period of 20 years. Rhenus Veniro was contracted to operate three Stadler Regio-Shuttle RS1 diesel multiple units that were modified for the steep grades of this route. As the operation of these new vehicles had still not been approved by the Federal Railway Authority (Eisenbahn-Bundesamt) in December 2009, the line continued to be operated by DB Regio Southwest with locomotive-hauled push-pull trains.

In the autumn of 2010 Emmelshausen station was rebuilt. Two new switches were installed and a new platform was built on track 1 to enable trains to stop there again. The signal box at the entrance to the station became redundant during the conversion work.

On the last day before the Easter school holidays on the 15 April 2011, Zweckverband SPNV-Nord terminated the operations of DB Regio on the line. During the holidays, the platforms at Boppard-Fleckertshöhe and Ehr stations were renewed. On 29 April 2011, the Federal Railway Authority issued a limited operating license to Rhenus Veniro for the three RS1 DMUs (650350–650352), valid to 31 December 2011, allowing them to be used. Further modifications to the brake system were necessary to obtain a full permit. Until these were carried out the DMUs could not be operated at full occupancy.

After a few, minor repairs by the manufacturer, Stadler Rail, Rhenus Veniro commenced operations on 4 May 2011 at 05:23, three days after the announced date for scheduled operations. However, not all three trains were used as the repairs were not complete. Therefore, the route was initially operated with one train, with additional buses used for school transport. From 8 August 2011, the first day of school after the summer holidays, Rhenus Veniro operated two coupled DMUs for the student traffic, which allowed a reduction in the operation of school buses.

One of the three DMUs received unrestricted approval from the Federal Railway Authority in December 2011. The other two vehicles received full approval at the beginning of January 2012. Since then, the three-carriage DMUs have been able to run, so no additional school buses are now required.

== Grades ==
The section of the Hunsrück Railway from Boppard to Emmelshausen is the steepest adhesion railway in western Germany. On the six-kilometre section from Boppard to Boppard-Buchholz it climbs 336 metres. The grade is 6.09% or 1 in 16.4. The section of the Hunsrück Railway between Boppard and Emmelshausen is protected as a monument as a result.

== Fares ==
The whole section of the line, which is in service for public transport, is located in the area of the transport association Verkehrsverbund Rhein-Mosel (VRM).

== See also ==
- Hunsrückquerbahn
- Boppard Central Station
