= Nannhausen =

- Municipality
- Coat of arms

- Location of Nannhausen within Rhein-Hunsrück-Kreis district
- Interactive map of Nannhausen
- Location within Germany Location within Rhineland-Palatinate
- Coordinates: 49°58′32″N 7°28′46″E
- Country: Germany
- State: Rhineland-Palatinate
- District: Rhein-Hunsrück-Kreis
- Municipal assoc.: Simmern-Rheinböllen
- Subdivisions: 3

Government
  - Mayor (2020–24): Manuel Bange

Area
  - Total: 6.05 km^{2} (2.34 sq mi)
- Elevation: 355 m (1,165 ft)

Population (2025-12-31)
  - Total: 614
  - Density: 101/km^{2} (263/sq mi)
- Time zone: UTC+01:00 (CET)
  - Summer (DST): UTC+02:00 (CEST)
- Postal codes: 55469
- Dialling codes: 06761
- Vehicle registration: SIM
- Website: www.nannhausen.de

Nannhausen is an Ortsgemeinde – a municipality belonging to a Verbandsgemeinde, a kind of collective municipality – in the Rhein-Hunsrück-Kreis (district) in Rhineland-Palatinate, Germany. It belongs to the Verbandsgemeinde Simmern-Rheinböllen, whose seat is in Simmern.

== Geography ==
=== Location ===
The municipality lies in the central Hunsrück at the end of the Biebertal (Bieberbach valley), roughly 3 km west of Simmern.

=== Constituent communities ===
Nannhausen has one outlying centre, or Ortsteil, named Nickweiler, and also belonging to the municipality are the Kauerhof (farm) and the Kauermühle (mill) west of the village, and the Schmiedel to the east.

== History ==
In 1399, Nannhausen had its first documentary mention in a document from Count Johann IV of Sponheim. Nannhausen belonged to the Ravengiersburg Monastery and in 1557, in the wake of the Reformation, passed to the Duchy of Palatinate-Simmern. At first, the village was Lutheran, but then later it became Reformed. Once the Dukes of Palatinate-Simmern had died out in 1673, the village passed to Electoral Palatinate, and in 1686, it was no longer forbidden to practise the Catholic faith. Beginning in 1794, Nannhausen lay under French rule. In 1814 it was assigned to the Kingdom of Prussia at the Congress of Vienna. After being under French occupation again after each of the world wars, it became part of the then newly founded state of Rhineland-Palatinate in 1946. The current municipality came into being on 17 March 1974 through the merger of the municipalities of Nannhausen and Nickweiler.

A picture of life in the village from the time of French rule beginning with his grandfather's recollections and ending with his own was descriptively written by Nannhausen's onetime reeve (Ortsvorsteher), Heinrich Weinrich.

=== Nickweiler ===
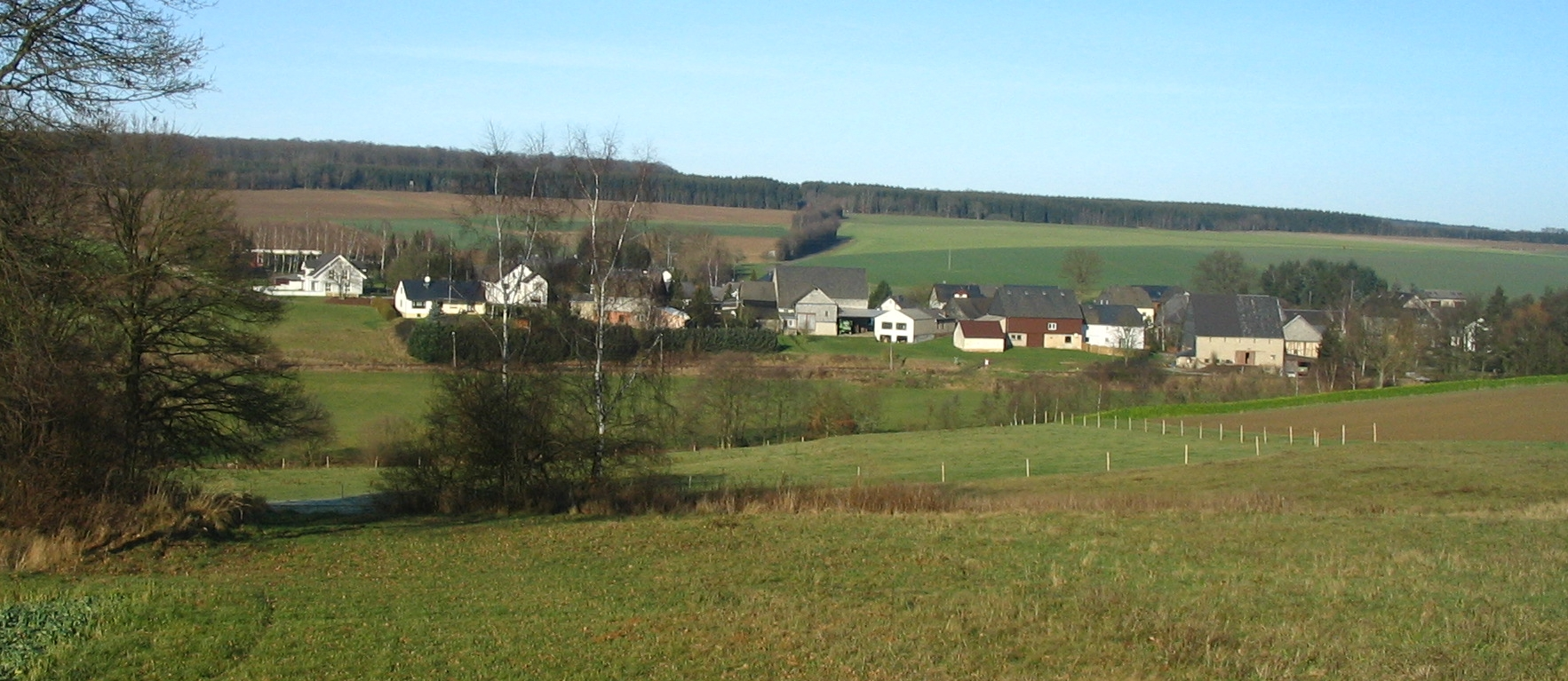
View of Nickweiler from the south

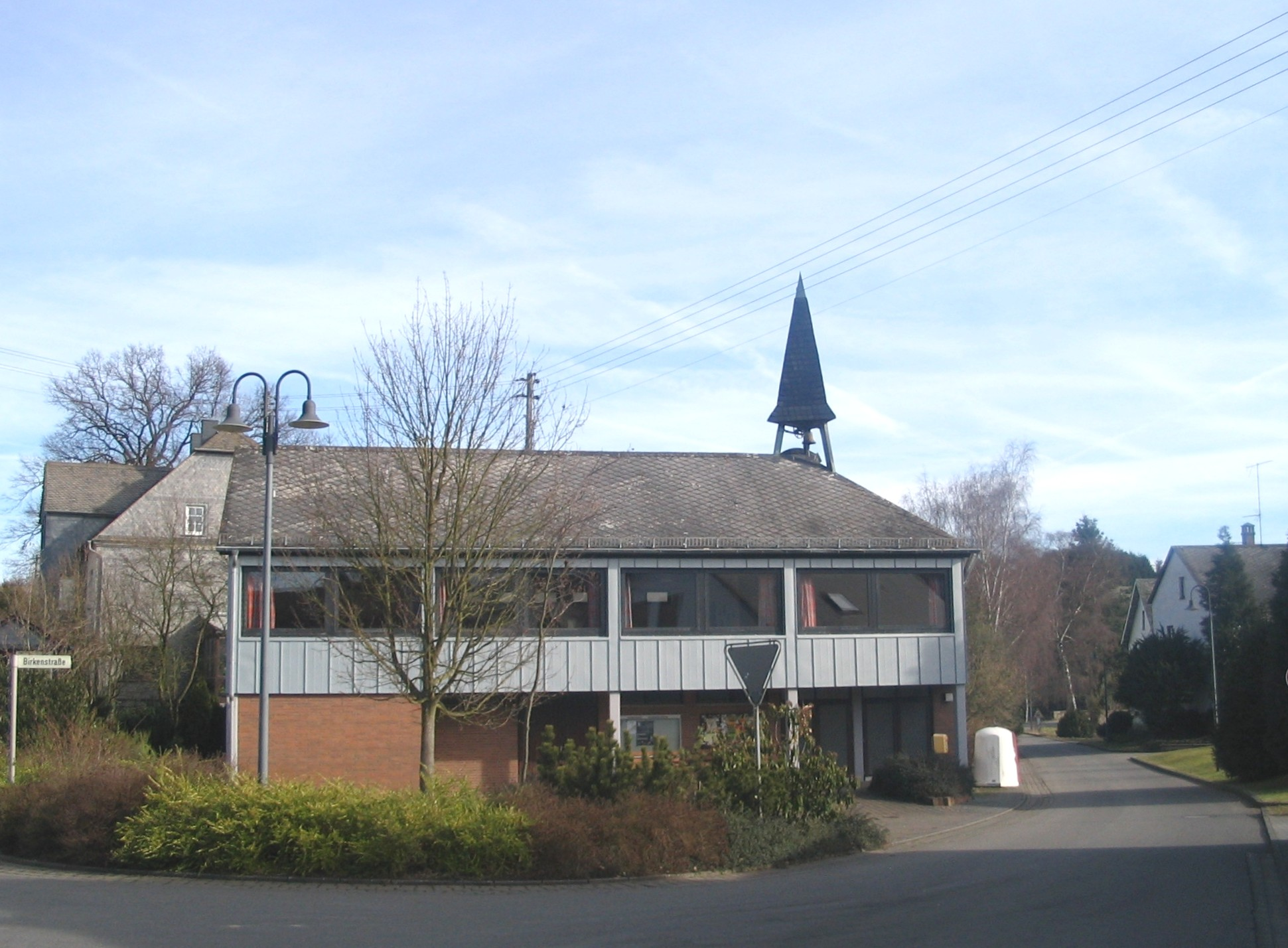
Nickweiler community centre

In 1285, Nickweiler had its first documentary mention in a document from the Ravengiersburg Monastery. As a former estate of the Ravengiersburg Augustinian Canonical Foundation, it has a rich heritage. The centre of Der Kauerhof (always with the article) within Nickweiler's limits is one of the few that were mentioned at the time of the monastery's founding in 1074. Since administrative restructuring in 1974, Nickweiler has been an Ortsteil of Nannhausen. A chronicle was published in 1985 on the occasion of the 700th anniversary of Nickweiler's first documentary mention.

=== Schmiedel ===
The founding of the so-called Schmiedelanstalten (roughly “Swamp Institutions” – named for this wetland area, “Auf dem Schmiedel”, where they were originally found) goes back to Johann Wichern's ideas about saving troubled youth. His ideas were brought to the Hunsrück in 1848 by the Simmern clergyman Julius Reuß.

On Reuß's initiative, some Evangelical citizens in Simmern founded the Verein der Inneren Mission (“Association of the Inner Mission”) in 1849 with the goal of building in the Hunsrück a haven for neglected children. As early as autumn 1850, work could be begun in a small farmhouse in Michelbach with a group of boys. After the acquisition of the needed lands on the Schmiedel, the group moved into the main house in 1851. At the 300th anniversary of the introduction of the Reformation in the Duchy of Palatinate-Simmern by Frederick III, Elector Palatine, the confirmands’ institute was opened in 1857 in collaboration with the Gustav-Adolf-Werk, an Evangelical social aid organization. Both these projects are now under the umbrella of the Verein der Schmiedelanstalten e.V., a member of the Evangelical Church's outreach works in the Rhineland. In 1986, the Verein der Schmiedelanstalten decided to build a home in Kastellaun for people with mental handicaps. It was opened in 1998 and named the Julius-Reuß-Wohnheim.

== Politics ==
=== Municipal council ===
The council is made up of 12 council members, who were elected by majority vote at the municipal election held on 7 June 2009, and the honorary mayor as chairman.

=== Mayor ===
Nannhausen's mayor is Manuel Bange, installed in 2020.

=== Coat of arms ===
The German blazon reads: In Schwarz über einer silbernen Gewandschließe ein goldener erniedrigter Sparren, begleitet oben rechts und links von je einem silbernen fünfstrahligen Stern.

The municipality's arms might in English heraldic language be described thus: Sable a chevron Or, in chief two mullets of five in fess argent and in base an arming buckle of the same.

The gold chevron stands for the merger of the municipalities of Nannhausen and Nickweiler, and the two mullets (star shapes) stand for the Ortsteile. The buckle stands for the baronial family Schmidtburg, whose arms bore such a buckle as the main charge. It was to these barons that the dwellers of Nannhausen, among other places, had to pay tithes. The tinctures Or and sable (gold and black) refer to the village's status as a municipality in the Verbandsgemeinde of Simmern.

The arms have been borne since 13 July 1983.

== Culture and sightseeing ==
=== Buildings ===
The following are listed buildings or sites in Rhineland-Palatinate’s Directory of Cultural Monuments:

- Auf der Höh 3 – estate complex; timber-frame house, plastered, possibly from the early 19th century
- Nickweilerer Straße 2 – timber-frame house, plastered, 19th century

=== Parks ===
On the broad lands, formerly worked as farms, of the Schmiedelanstalten, the first part of the Schmiedelpark was opened on 17 May 2002 as an adventure park with playgrounds for preschoolers and school-age children, an animal pen housing a petting zoo, a biotope, a “sense path”, a riding facility, a mountain biking lot, a barbecue pavilion and a supply pavilion.

=== Sport and leisure ===
The Biebertaler-Rundweg, a path with a total length of 26.5 km, links the villages of the Biebertal together.

== Economy and infrastructure ==
=== Transport ===
Nannhausen and Nickweiler both lie right on the disused Hunsrückquerbahn (railway) between Langenlonsheim and Hermeskeil.

=== Public institutions ===
The outlying centre of Schmiedel is the cradle of the Schmiedel children's and youth home (Verein der Schmiedelanstalten e.V.), a charitable institution for youth welfare. On the property are also found a short-term care facility, which is an outpost of the Evangelical Dr. Theodor-Fricke Alten- und Pflegeheim (nursing and seniors’ home) in Simmern, and the social-paediatric centre of the deaconry of Kreuznach.
