= Langenlonsheim station =

Junction station in Langenlonsheim, Rhineland-Palatinate, Germany

Langenlonsheim
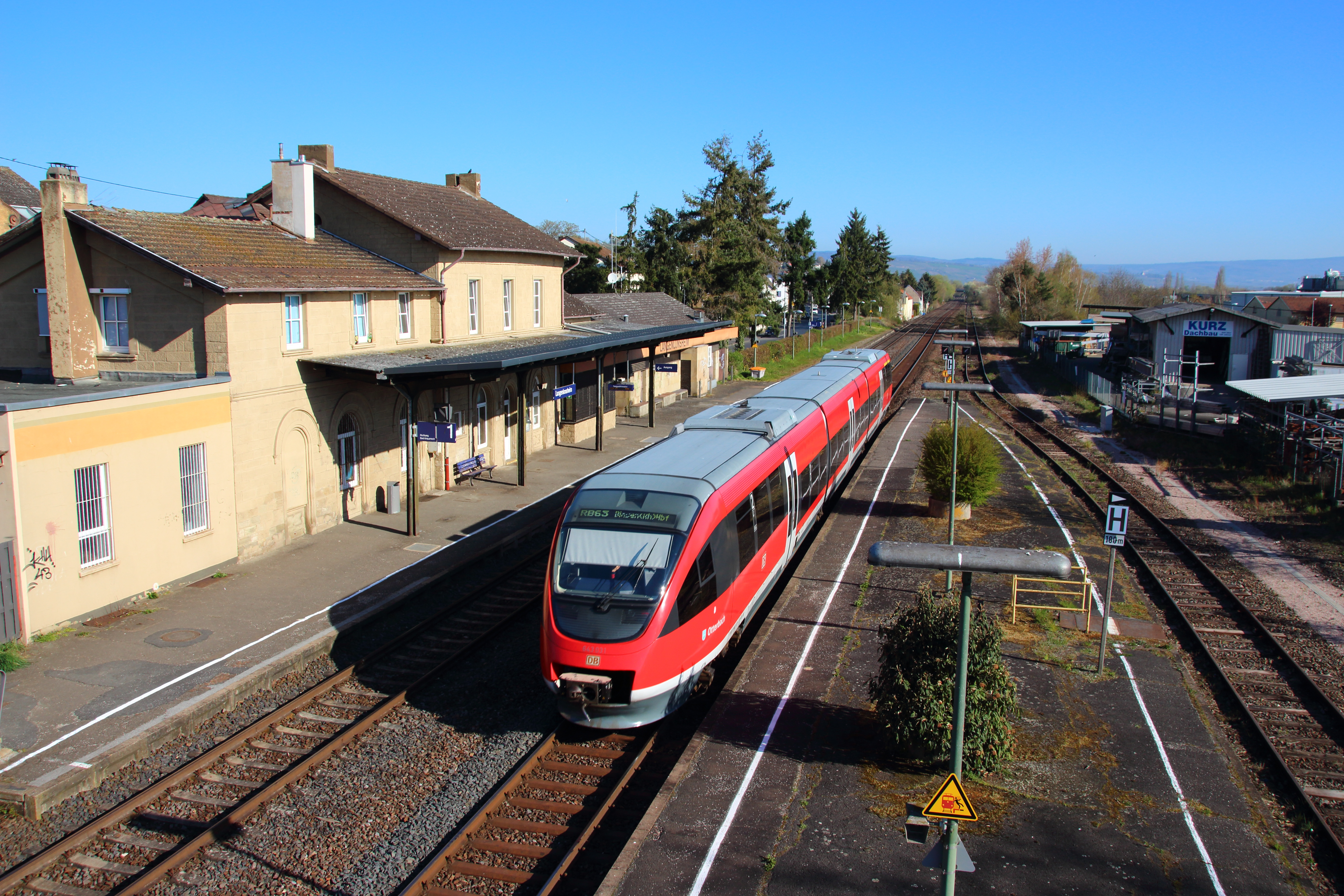
- View of the station and the entrance building

General information
- Location: Naheweinstr. 184, Langenlonsheim, Rhineland-Palatinate; Germany
- Coordinates: 49°54′05″N 7°54′00″E
- Lines: Bingen (Rhein)–Saarbrücken (km 8.0); Trans-Hunsrück Railway (km 0.0) (currently only freight traffic)
- Platforms: 3

Construction
- Accessible: No

Other information
- Station code: 3545
- DS100 code: SLN
- IBNR: 8004253
- Category: 6
- Fare zone: RNN: 331 and 404; : 6970 (RNN transitional tariff)
- Website: www.bahnhof.de

History
- Opened: 1858

Services
Preceding station	DB Regio Mitte	Following station
Bretzenheim (Nahe) towards Kaiserslautern Hbf	RB 65	Laubenheim (Nahe) towards Bingen Hbf
Location

Langenlonsheim station is a junction station in the town of Langenlonsheim in the German state of Rhineland-Palatinate. It is located at line-kilometre 8.0 of the Nahe Valley Railway (Nahetalbahn) and has three platforms. The Trans-Hunsrück Railway (Hunsrückquerbahn) branches in the station towards Simmern; it is still used as far as Stromberg for freight traffic.

== History ==
Langenlonsheim station was built 1858 as a station on the Nahe Valley Railway. By 1878 at the latest the station had at least four tracks, two of which were main tracks. In 1889, the Trans-Hunsrück Railway was opened to the station. However, the station remained only a junction station, since the passenger trains always went through to Bingerbrück or Bad Kreuznach. The few trains which terminated in the station never stayed long before they returned to Simmern. There was a bay platform (track 10) for the trains from the Hunsrück, which was dismantled in 1978. Otherwise trains used the through tracks, platforms 1 and 2 and platform 3 which served as an overtaking loop. There were also freight tracks, which were mainly used for the movement of locomotives.

In the 1930s, the station was expanded and modernised in response to the building of the line from the Hindenburg Bridge and Rüdesheim as well as the Trans-Hunsrück Railway and signal boxes (Lf and Ln) were installed. After the Hindenburg bridge had been destroyed in the Second World War, the associated track was rebuilt after 1945. Remains of this track work (crossover and dead-end track) still exist today.

Up to the 1960s, passenger traffic was handled over pedestrian level crossings, but these were then replaced by an overpass. During the construction of the overpass, the island platform was built for tracks 2/3.

The two mechanical signal boxess Lf and Ln were replaced by a pushbutton interlocking of class DrL60 in 1978. At the same time some tracks and sets of points were removed, including track 10. The trains that ran from Trans-Hunsrück Railway then stopped on platform 3 until 1984.

In the 1990s, all the sidings were dismantled, so that today there are only a few traces of the former size of the station. The Ln signal box that guards the level crossing, a marshalling yard hump and a large birch forest in the area of the freight tracks still exist.

From 1911 to 1938, track 2 connected to the Bad Kreuznach tramway.

== Railway facilities ==
While the station now only has two main through tracks and a dead-end main track, it used to have many more tracks that were successively dismantled over the decades. However, the railway station never had a great significance for freight, since the freight trains were mostly handled in Bingerbrück.

Above the station is a pedestrian overpass built in the 1960s. However, the crossing is not barrier-free, as a proposal to upgrade has failed so far due to lack of space and financial resources. The municipal council, however, considers an upgrade of the overpass, in particular to provide accessibility, but also in the form of an extension to the industrial area to the east of the station as an urgent measure.

== Building ==
The station building is located at Naheweinstraße 184 and now accommodates a restaurant.

== Operations ==
The following service stops at Langenlonsheim station:

Rail services in the 2025 timetable
Train service	Route	Interval
RB 65	Kaiserslautern – (Hochspeyer –) Enkenbach – Rockenhausen – Bad Münster a Stein – Bad Kreuznach – Langenlonsheim – Bingen (Rhein)	Hourly
