= Hunsrückquerbahn =

Deactivated railway in Rheinland-Pfalz, Germany

Trans-Hunsrück Railway
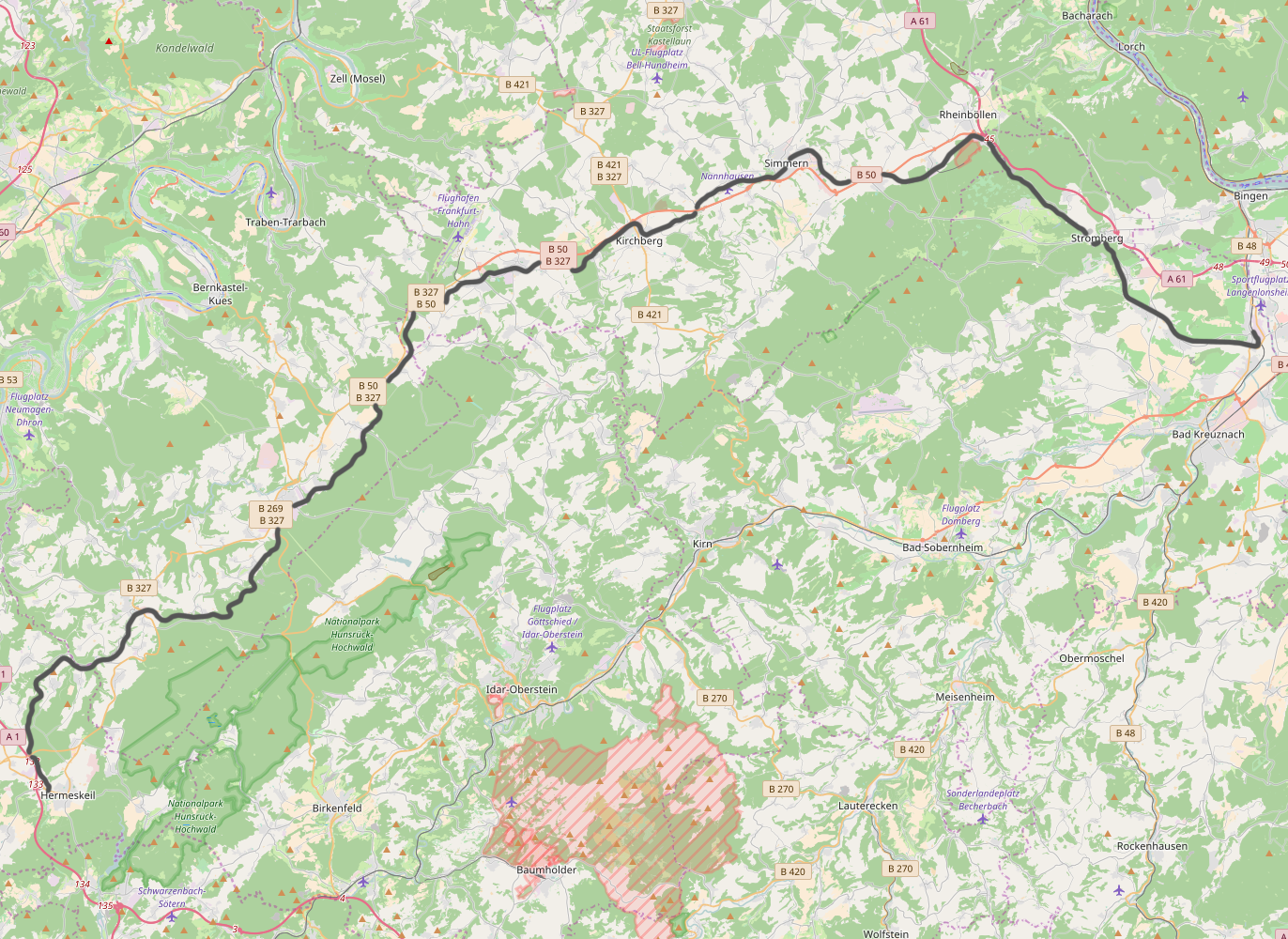
- Hunsrückquerbahn in black

Overview
- Native name: Hunsrückquerbahn
- Line number: 3021
- Locale: Rhineland-Palatinate
- Termini: Langenlonsheim; Hermeskeil

Service
- Route number: 607 (1984)

Technical
- Line length: 110.4 km (68.6 mi)
- Track gauge: 1,435 mm (4 ft 8 1/2 in) standard gauge
- Operating speed: 50 km/h (31 mph)

The Hunsrückquerbahn (English: Trans-Hunsrück Railway) is a deactivated railway located in the Hunsrück region of Rheinland-Pfalz, Germany. The line connects with the Nahe Valley Railway (Nahetalbahn) in Langenlonsheim to the east with the partially abandoned Hochwaldbahn in Hermeskeil to the west. It was the primary railway through the Hunsrück, having both passenger and freight services.

Originally called the Hunsrückbahn, the change of name occurred as adjustments to passenger service occurred between 1978 and 1984. A nearby railway and former spur route that continues to serve passenger and tourist traffic between Boppard and Emmelshausen now carries the original name, while the original railway was renamed the Hunsrückquerbahn.

== History ==
The Hunsrückquerbahn was developed in stages. The first stage was completed in 1889, connecting Langenlonsheim with Simmern, the principal town of the region. Further extensions included Simmern to Kirchberg in 1901, Kirchberg to Morbach in 1902, and Morbach to Hermeskeil in 1903. Spur routes to outlying villages in region were created, but most have since been dismantled. One spur route between Simmern and Kastellaun has been re purposed as a bike path.

The railway became an important transport link for the war efforts in both world wars. In February 1945, several viaducts of the railway were destroyed as Allied forces advanced through the region, disrupting service between Morbach and Hermeskeil until repairs were completed in 1950. Direct traffic control was installed on segments of the railway in the early 1960s. The timber industry was the primary user of the railway's freight operations. Localized passenger service was also conducted during the 1970s and 1980s, but they were ended due to budget considerations. In 1990 and 1991, the railway was heavily utilized by the United States Armed Forces during the Persian Gulf War.

Upon improvements to the road network in the region, the railway's use declined steeply. In 1996, Deutsche Bahn (DB) transferred freight operations to Waldhof. In 1998, Waldhof was also given track maintenance responsibilities. That same year, the route was deactivated between Morbach and Hermeskeil. In 2003, inspections found that the stretch between Stromberg and Morbach was found to have safety deficiencies. DB petitioned to have the rails removed for that track component, but the Federal Railway Authority declined the application and ordered the stretch to be reactivated for use. An appeal of the decision by DB to the federal court in Koblenz was turned down, with the court stating that the company's obligation to serve the Hunsrück outweighed economic matters. A higher federal appeals court however overturned that decision, citing it unreasonable that future infrastructure investment along the railway was realistic. The state of Rheinland-Pfalz then sued DB, causing the railway to be released from DB's jurisdiction.

== Status ==
=== Reactivation to Hahn Airport ===
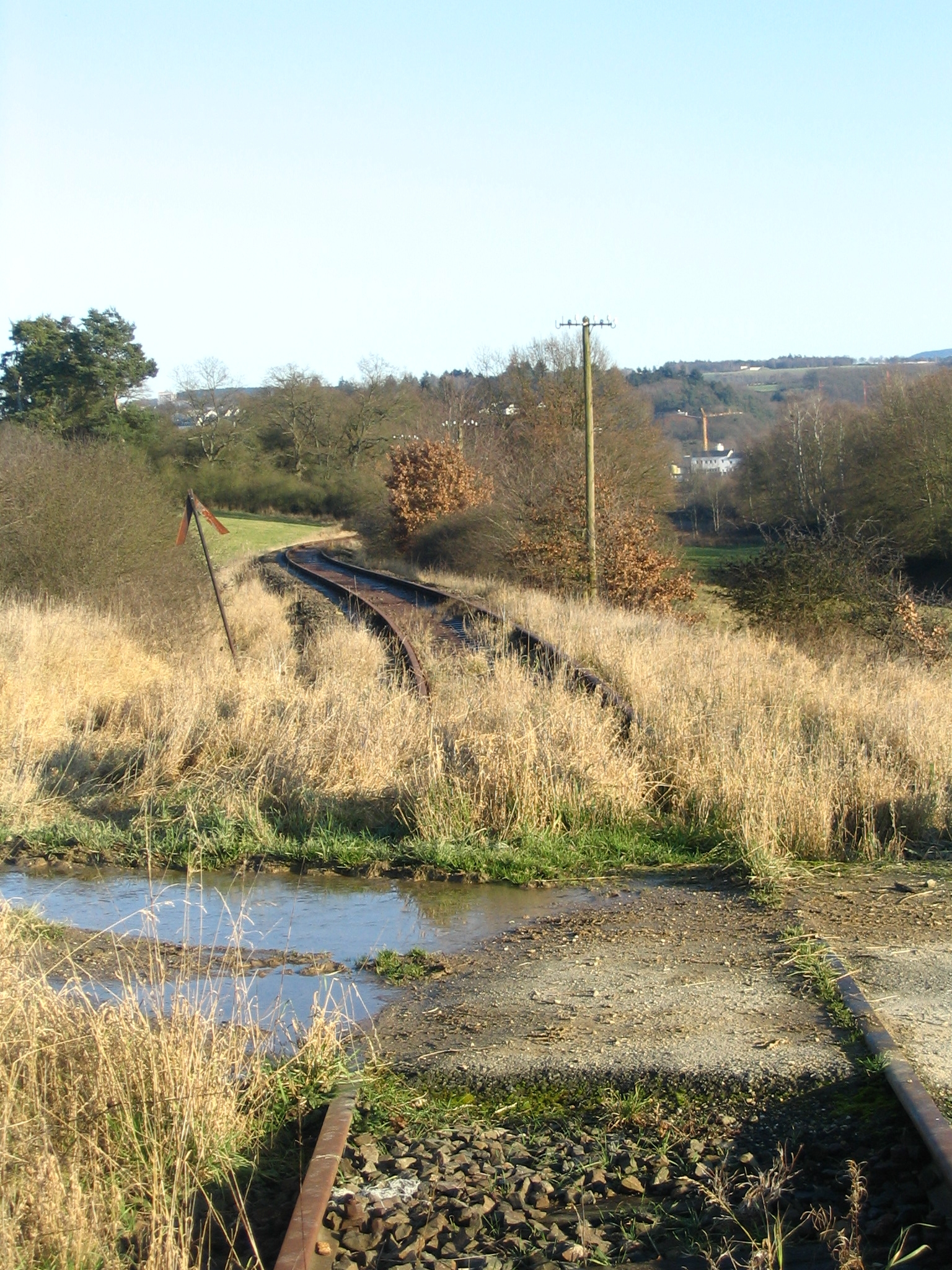
An abandoned segment of the Hunsrückquerbahn between Simmern and Nannhausen in 2006

In 2005, the Ministry of Transport for Rheinland-Pfalz announced a plan to reactivate the railway for passenger service to Frankfurt Hahn Airport. To demonstrate a commitment, buses connecting the remote airport with the greater Rhine-Main region would be utilized until the railway was re-activated for use. Originally forecasted to begin in 2010, the plan called for hourly Regional-Express (RE) train service between the airport and Mainz and a service to Bingen every two hours. In 2007, the Minister of Transport for Rheinland-Pfalz signed an agreement with DB to reactivate the railway, but stated that the goal to have service ready by 2010 was impractical. The route was to require extensive re-construction, including track doubling in several sections, thus raising costs significantly. Further studies showed that the entire railway required replacement of rails, sleepers, and ballasts in addition to reducing at-grade crossings. Planners also recommended the upgrade of the entire railway in one major project, rather than a phased project.

The opposition parties in Rheinland-Pfalz criticized the plan, stating that travel times along the railway would be lengthier than current road travel times between Hahn and the Rhine-Main metropolitan area. They proposed the extension of Autobahn A 60 and/or the upgrading of Bundesstrasse B 50 as a more cost-effective project to improve transport in the Hunsrück.

After lengthy delays and political wrangling, newspaper reports in 2011 stated that the earliest possibility to reactivate the railway for service to Hahn would be in 2018, but stated that the project might not happen at all. However, later that year, the state announced the continuation of planning and engineering studies for the project. In spring of 2013, the process for project permitting and approval began for sections of the track, with the Ministry of Transport confirming that the project approval would occur in stages, at the earliest in spring 2016.

=== Saar-Hunsrück Express ===
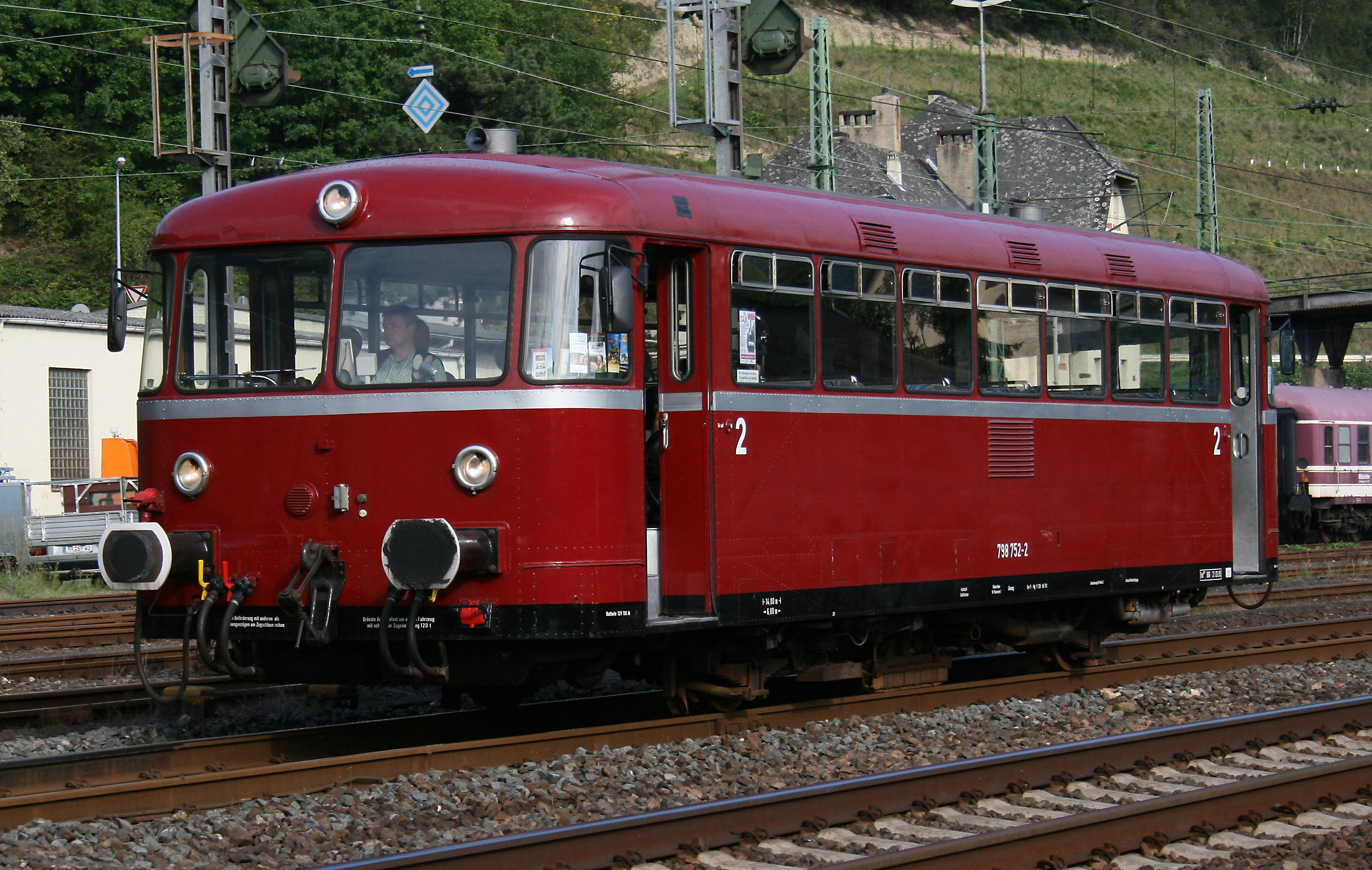
The Uerdingen railbus model utilized for the Saar-Hunsrück Express

From 2009 to 2013, an attempt to reactivate train service geared for tourists was launched on the stretch between Büchenbeuren and Hermeskeil, in addition to portions of other railways in the region. The Hochwaldbahn (HWB) Verkehrsgesellschaft seasonally operated the so-called Saar-Hunsrück Express. The company utilized the popular and quirky Uerdingen railbus for its equipment in running the service. The company had to shutter service due to lingering track damage near Morbach. In four years, the service drew roughly 40,000 users on a periodic timetable. The company forfeited usage of the tracks back to DB. The company stated it had hoped to demonstrate to state lawmakers that there was sufficient interest for passenger and tourist train usage in the Hunsrück.

== See also ==
- Hunsrückbahn
