= Oberwesel station =

Railway station in Oberwesel, Germany

Oberwesel
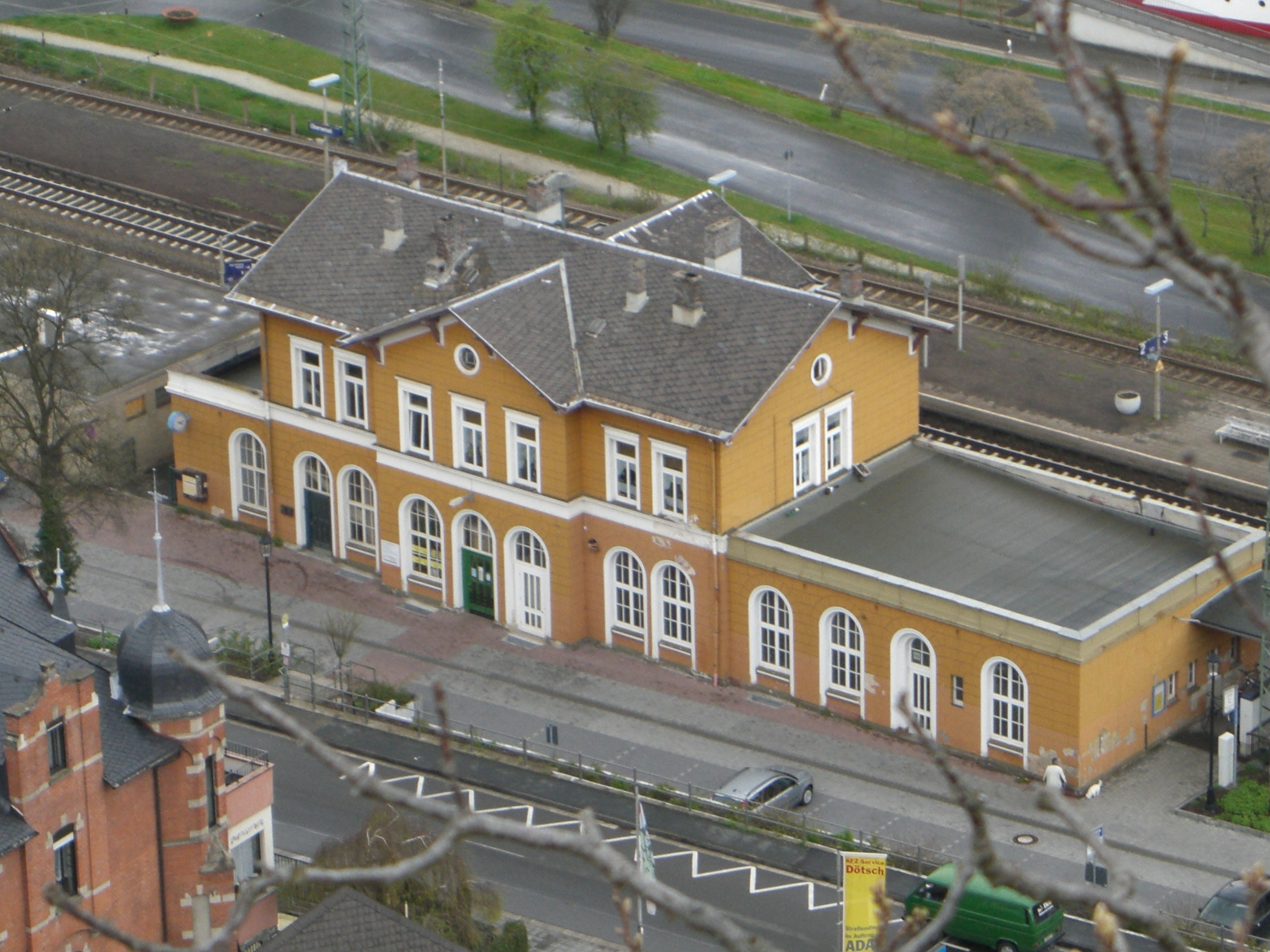
- Station building from the air

General information
- Location: Oberwesel, Rhineland-Palatinate; Germany
- Coordinates: 50°06′16″N 7°43′54″E
- Lines: Cologne-Mainz; Bingen-Saarbrücken
- Platforms: 3

Construction
- Accessible: Platform 1 only

Other information
- Station code: 4711
- DS100 code: FOBW
- Category: 5
- Fare zone: VRM: 616
- Website: www.bahnhof.de

History
- Opened: 15 December 1859
Services
Preceding station	DB Regio Mitte	Following station
Boppard Hbf towards Frankfurt (Main) Hbf	RE 2 Südwest-Express	Bingen Hbf towards Koblenz Hbf
Preceding station	Trans Regio	Following station
St. Goar towards Köln Messe/Deutz	RB 26	Bacharach towards Mainz Hbf
Preceding station	Vlexx	Following station
Boppard Hbf towards Koblenz Hbf	RE 17	Bingen Hbf towards Kaiserslautern Hbf
Location

Oberwesel station is on the West Rhine Railway (German: Linke Rheinstrecke) between Koblenz and Mainz in the UNESCO World Heritage Site of the Upper Middle Rhine Valley in the German state of Rhineland-Palatinate. The station is classified by Deutsche Bahn as a category 5 station. It is in the southern part of the town of Oberwesel and is served by Regional-Express services operated by Deutsche Bahn and Regionalbahn trains operated by trans regio Deutsche Regionalbahn.

== History ==
Oberwesel station was opened with the extension of the West Rhine Railway from Koblenz to Bingen at the end of 1859. In 1896, a track was built to the port. In 1907/08, the station building was extended by additions on its sides: an office for the station master, a station restaurant, and a 3rd class waiting room were added. In 1925–1927, the lobby was renovated and a separate toilet block was constructed on Mainzer Straße. In 1956, a pedestrian underpass was built under the tracks and in 1969/70 a building housing a relay interlocking was built next to the entrance building. In 2004, in the course of the construction of a park and ride facility, the toilet block was torn down.

== Infrastructure ==
The station building at Oberwesel currently only accommodates residences and the interlocking. Tickets can be purchased at two ticket machines in the station entrance. The ticket office at the bus station acts as an agent of Deutsche Bahn and also sells rail tickets.

The station has three platform tracks. The “home” platform (platform 1) is connected by a pedestrian underpass to the central platform (tracks 2 and 3). In general, trains towards Mainz stop at platform 1 and trains towards Koblenz stop at track 2. Track 3 is used only by services that begin or end here or are overtaken (scheduled or unscheduled) here.

A new park and ride facility was built during the modernisation of the station. This includes approximately 100 parking spaces and parking for taxis, motor-scooters and bicycles. There are several bus bays for regional bus services.

== Rail services ==
Oberwesel station is served by the following regional services:

Line	Line name	Route	Frequency	Days of operation
RE 2	Südwest-Express	Koblenz – Boppard – Oberwesel – Bingen (Rhein) – Mainz – Frankfurt Airport (regional) – Frankfurt (Main) Hbf	120 min	Working days except Saturdays
RE 17		Koblenz – Boppard – Oberwesel – Bingen – Bad Kreuznach – Kaiserslautern	120 min	daily
RB 26	MittelrheinBahn	Koblenz – Boppard – Oberwesel – Bingen (Rhein) – Ingelheim – Mainz	60 min	Daily

Additional excursion trains run on Sundays and public holidays from May to October. These Regional-Express train pairs run from Koblenz to Wissembourg (the Weinstrassen-Express) and from Karlsruhe to Koblenz (the Rheintal-Express).
