= Langenlonsheim =

- Municipality
- Coat of arms

- Location of Langenlonsheim within Bad Kreuznach district
- Interactive map of Langenlonsheim
- Location within Germany Location within Rhineland-Palatinate
- Coordinates: 49°53′41″N 07°53′53″E
- Country: Germany
- State: Rhineland-Palatinate
- District: Bad Kreuznach
- Municipal assoc.: Langenlonsheim-Stromberg

Government
  - Mayor (2019–24): Bernhard Wolf

Area
  - Total: 11.91 km^{2} (4.60 sq mi)
- Elevation: 160 m (520 ft)

Population (2025-12-31)
  - Total: 4,449
  - Density: 373.6/km^{2} (967.5/sq mi)
- Time zone: UTC+01:00 (CET)
  - Summer (DST): UTC+02:00 (CEST)
- Postal codes: 55450
- Dialling codes: 06704
- Vehicle registration: KH

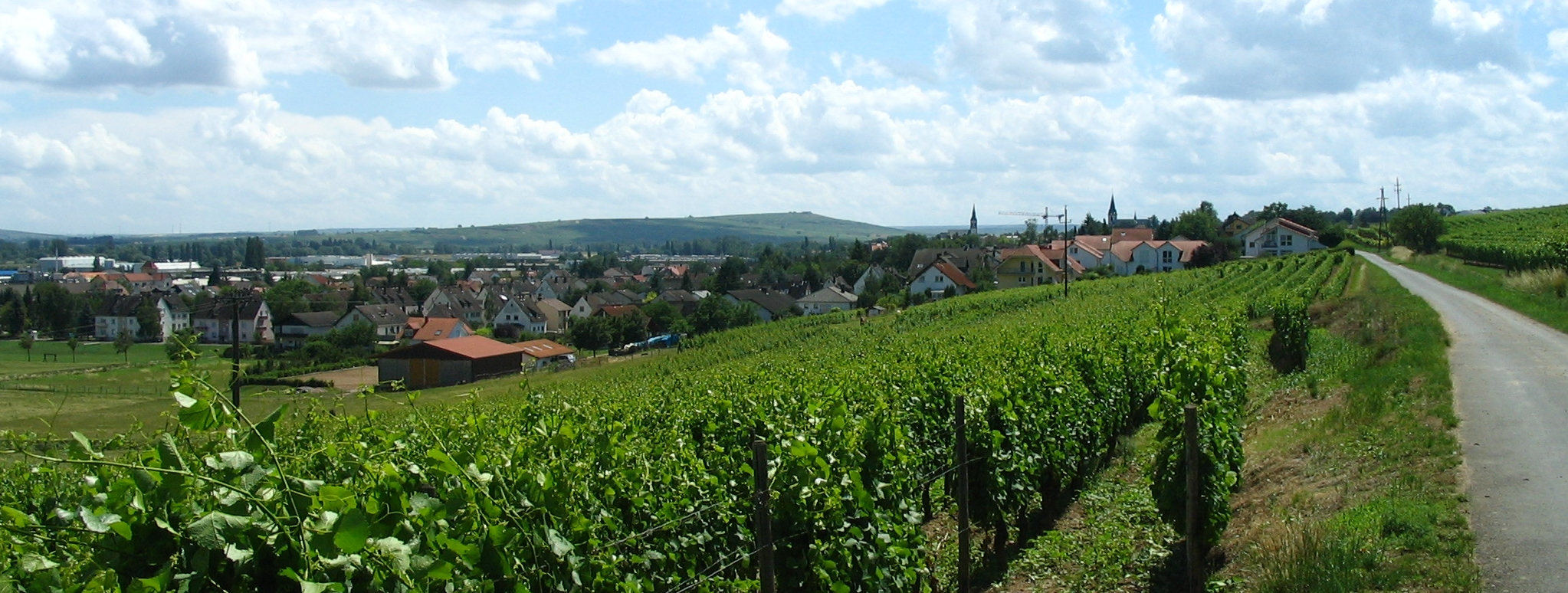
View from the east; to the left flows the Nahe

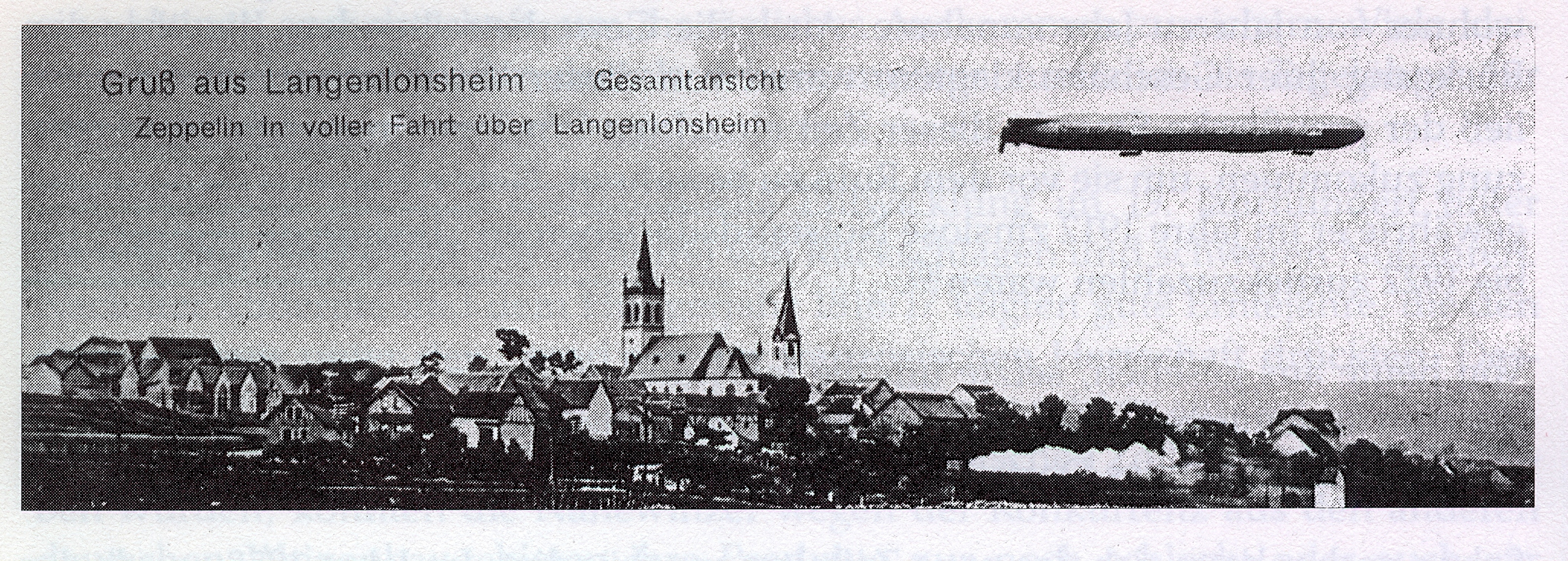
Zeppelin over Langenlonsheim on 22 June 1910

Langenlonsheim is an Ortsgemeinde – a municipality belonging to a Verbandsgemeinde, a kind of collective municipality – in the Bad Kreuznach district in Rhineland-Palatinate, Germany. It belongs to the Verbandsgemeinde Langenlonsheim-Stromberg, and is also its seat. Langenlonsheim is a state-recognized tourism community and a winegrowing village.

== Geography ==
=== Location ===
Langenlonsheim lies between the southern edge of the Hunsrück and the Nahe. Lying 7 km away is the district seat, Bad Kreuznach, while Bingen am Rhein lies just under 10 km away. On the municipality's western outskirts, the Guldenbach flows by, while the Nahe flows by to the south. Langenlonsheim is well known for its good vineyards and wineries and its Qualitätsweine. Fertile loess soils and the region's warm climate have been defining factors for the village.

=== Neighbouring municipalities ===
Clockwise from the north, Langenlonsheim's neighbours are the municipalities of Laubenheim, Grolsheim, Gensingen, Bretzenheim, Guldental, Windesheim, Waldlaubersheim and Dorsheim. Grolsheim and Gensingen both lie in the neighbouring Mainz-Bingen district, whereas all the others likewise lie within the Bad Kreuznach district. Langenlonsheim also comes to within a few metres of two other neighbours: the municipality of Rümmelsheim in the northwest and the town of Bad Kreuznach in the southeast.

=== Constituent communities ===
Also belonging to Langenlonsheim is the outlying homestead of Forsthaus Langenlonsheim.

== History ==
Even as long ago as Roman times, there was winegrowing in what is now Langenlonsheim. In 769, Langenlonsheim had its first documentary mention as Longistisheim. Over its long history, the village changed owners many times. Under French rule, Langenlonsheim became the seat of a mairie ("mayoralty") in 1800, to which five municipalities belonged. This arrangement persisted even after the French were driven out and the region was assigned under the terms of the Congress of Vienna to the Kingdom of Prussia in 1815, although it was thereafter known as a Bürgermeisterei (also "mayoralty"). In those days, the population was still very much engaged in agriculture as its main income earner.

=== Jewish history ===
Langenlonsheim had a Jewish community until sometime between 1938 and 1942. It arose sometime in the 17th or 18th century. The earliest mention of a Jewish family in the village – named Benedict – comes from 1685. In 1695 a Wendel Judt was named. In 1722, two Jewish families were named (Jud Benedict and Mayer), while in 1743 it was four (Hayum Benedict, Götz Benedict, Juda Kahn and Meyer). In 1790, the following Jewish household heads were named: Hayum Benedict (widow), Joseph Benedict, Nadan Benedict Maier, Gottschlag Jude, Benedict Joseph, Sükkind Juda, David Götz and Benedict Nadan. In the 19th century, the number of Jewish inhabitants developed as follows: in 1808 there were 45; in 1843, there were 42 (of all together 1,236 inhabitants); in 1858, 73; in 1895, 70. In 1808, the following Jewish families were listed (the names given in brackets were those borne after Napoleonic French rule ended): Israel Brill, Benoît (Benedict) Goetz, Gottschalk Kahn, Widow (?) Rebekka Kuhn, Widow (of Joseph Kaufmann) Schoene Kaufmann née Kuhn, Benoît (Benedict) Natt, Mayer Natt, Jacques (Jakob) Scheier (Scheuer), Moses Schweiss (Schweig), Widow Judith Stern, Seeligmann Stern. In the way of institutions, there were a synagogue (see Synagogue below), a Jewish school (a schoolroom at the synagogue), a mikveh and a graveyard (see Jewish graveyard below). To provide for the community's religious needs, a schoolteacher was hired, who also busied himself as the hazzan and the shochet (preserved is a whole series of job advertisements for such a position in Langenlonsheim from such publications as Der Israelit). Among the religion teachers were, about 1855 David Cahn from Mertloch, in 1857 Heinrich Hirschfeld from Dessau, in 1861 Julius Kappel (or Koppel) and in 1893 Michael Boreich. The Jewish household heads were active in various occupations, foremost in trading. There were several businesses and shops in Langenlonsheim belonging to Jewish families (businesses with domestic products and fertilizer, several wine dealer's shops, men's and women's clothing and bedding shops as well as livestock and grain dealerships). There were also Jewish bakers and butchers. The Jewish inhabitants were fully integrated into village life and played a lively part in public life and in the village's clubs, even as club founders and chairmen: Heinrich Natt and Siegmund Hirschberger were founding members in 1887 of the Verein für Leibesübungen 1887 Langenlonsheim e.V. (a club for physical exercise), while Siegmund Heymann, Siegmund Hirschberger, Carl Mayer and Emil Natt were, among other such endeavours, founding members in 1902 of the Langenlonsheim volunteer fire brigade. Two members of Langenlonsheim's Jewish community fell in the First World War, Unteroffizier Sally Natt (b. 7 July 1889 in Langenlonsheim, d. 26 September 1914) and Gefreiter Arthur Metzger (b. 6 November 1883 in Langenlonsheim, d. May 1915). Both names appear on the monument to the fallen in the First World War that stands before the general graveyard. All together, fourteen Jewish men were in wartime service; several came back highly decorated. About 1924, when there were still some 50 persons in the Jewish community (2.5% of the total population of some 2,000 inhabitants), the community leaders were Ludwig Mayer and Fritz Natt. Then living in each of Bretzenheim and Laubenheim were seven Jews. In 1932, the community leader was Carl Mayer. Tending the community's religious needs was Rabbi Dr. Jacob (Bad Kreuznach). About 1930, the following families were living in Langenlonsheim: Karl Mayer (wine dealer, Bingerstraße 2), Rudolf Mayer (men's and women's clothing, bedding and manufactured goods, Bingerstraße 11), Ludwig Mayer (livestock dealer, Hauptstraße 52), Fritz Natt (wine dealer, Hollergasse 28/corner of Weidenstraße), Moritz Weiss (butcher and livestock and wine dealer, Hauptstraße 24), Siegmund Heymann (domestic products, Hauptstraße 39), Carl Nachmann (wine and grain dealer, Hauptstraße 35), August Weiss (livestock dealer, Schulstraße 12), Gustav Kahn (plumber, Hollergasse 20) and the Family Blank (religion teacher, Kreuznacher Straße).

After 1933 (Langenlonsheim's Jewish population that year was 40), the year when Adolf Hitler and the Nazis seized power, though, some of the Jews moved away or even emigrated in the face of the boycotting of their businesses, the progressive stripping of their rights and repression, all brought about by the Nazis. In the 1939 Bad Kreuznach book of inhabitants (presumably presenting 1938 figures), five Jewish families are still listed: Karl Mayer, Rudolf Mayer, Fritz Natt, August Weiss and Moritz Weiss. On Kristallnacht (9–10 November 1938), the synagogue was utterly demolished by Nazi brigands from within Langenlonsheim and without. The families of Fritz Natt, Karl Mayer, Karl Nachmann and Moritz Weiss had their houses invaded and destroyed as living spaces. Several Jews were mishandled and more than slightly injured. The Jewish men were taken away to Dachau concentration camp. After the first deportation on 10 April 1942, Langenlonsheim's last two Jewish inhabitants, August Weiss and his wife Isabella Weiss née Furchheimer, were deported on 25 April 1942. According to the Gedenkbuch – Opfer der Verfolgung der Juden unter der nationalsozialistischen Gewaltherrschaft in Deutschland 1933-1945 ("Memorial Book – Victims of the Persecution of the Jews under National Socialist Tyranny") and Yad Vashem, of all Jews who either were born in Langenlonsheim or lived there for a long time, 50 were killed through Nazi persecution (birthdates in brackets):

1. Henriette Arnstein née Mayer (1866)
2. Selma Baumgarten née Kahn (1888)
3. Anny Blank (1895)
4. Lili Brück née Natt (1892)
5. Lotte Brück (1922)
6. Berthold Cahn (1871)
7. Else (Elsa) Groß née Mayer (1895)
8. Paul Groß (1883)
9. Hilde Hallgarten née Simon (1895)
10. Rosalie Herz née Mayer (1868)
11. Siegfried Hirschberger (1870)
12. Paula (Paulina) Jakobi née Natt (1876)
13. Elise Kahn née Natt (1862)
14. Gustav Kahn (1885)
15. Henriette Johanna Kahn née Weiss (1889)
16. Henriette Marx née Natt (1854)
17. Toni (Antoni) Marx née Weiß (1876)
18. Emilie Mayer (1883)
19. Erich Mayer (1888)
20. Fritz Mayer (1888)
21. Ida Mayer née Marx (1890)
22. Johanna Mayer née Heymann (1872)
23. Leiselotte Mayer (1910)
24. Ludwig Mayer (1864)
25. Richard Mayer (1922)
26. Rudolf Mayer (1885)
27. Jakob Nachmann (1880)
28. Isidor Natt (1871)
29. Paulina Natt (1876)
30. Rudolf Natt (1879)
31. Franziska Neuburger née Natt (1879)
32. Elisabeth Gertrud Schneider (1897)
33. Irma Schwarz née Nachmann (1900)
34. Regina Schweig née Natt (1870)
35. Selma Weil (1896)
36. Wilhelm Weil (1882)
37. August Weiss (1878)
38. Elisabetha Weiss née Michel (1883)
39. Else Weiss née Dornhardt (1914)
40. Isabella Weiss née Furchheimer (1878)
41. Klara Weiss (1885)
42. Kurt Weiss (1913)
43. Lina (Karoline) Weiss (1874)
44. Ludwig Weiss (1873)
45. Max Weiß (1887)
46. Max Weiss (1909)
47. Moritz Weiss (1880)
48. Sally Weiß (1908)
49. Sigmund Weiss (1882)
50. Helene Windecker née Weiss (1894)

On 1 September 2011, Gunter Demnig came to Langenlonsheim and laid 12 of his Stolpersteine in memory of Jews from Langenlonsheim who were murdered in the Holocaust.

=== Population development ===
Langenlonsheim's population development since Napoleonic times is shown in the table below. The figures for the years from 1871 to 1987 are drawn from census data:

Year	Inhabitants
1815	944
1835	1,243
1871	1,433
1905	1,731
1939	2,155

Year	Inhabitants
1950	2,748
1961	3,012
1970	3,544
1987	3,311
2005	3,634

== Religion ==
Langenlonsheim has both an Evangelical and a Catholic church community. There was formerly also an important Jewish community before the Nazis destroyed it. The first place of worship built in Langenlonsheim was Saint Nicholas's Church (Sankt-Nikolaus-Kirche), built about 1200, which was later mentioned as Saint John's Church (Sankt-Johannes-Kirche) about 1475. In 1504, in the War of the Succession of Landshut, and again in 1540 when the village burnt, the church was damaged. In 1588, a new church was built to serve as the Evangelical parish church. New Baroque (1777) and Gothic Revival (1868) remodellings followed. The second place of worship built in Langenlonsheim was the synagogue, built about 1860, which was destroyed on Kristallnacht (9–10 November 1938); its ruins were removed in 1958. The most recent house of worship built in Langenlonsheim has been the Catholic church, Saint John the Baptist's Parish Church (Pfarrkirche St. Johannes der Täufer), built in 1907 and 1908. As at 30 September 2013, there are 3,767 full-time residents in Langenlonsheim, and of those, 1,345 are Evangelical (35.705%), 1,305 are Catholic (34.643%), 4 are Lutheran (0.106%), 1 is Old Catholic (0.027%), 1 is Russian Orthodox (0.027%), 305 (8.097%) belong to other religious groups and 806 (21.396%) either have no religion or will not reveal their religious affiliation.

== Politics ==
=== Municipal council ===
The council is made up of 20 council members, who were elected by personalized proportional representation at the municipal election held on 7 June 2009, and the honorary mayor as chairman. The municipal election held on 7 June 2009 yielded the following results:

Year	SPD	CDU	FDP	GRÜNE	FLL	Total
2009	4	6	2	2	6	20 seats
2004	6	6	2	2	4	20 seats

=== Mayor ===
Langenlonsheim's mayor is Bernhard Wolf.

=== Coat of arms ===
The municipality's arms might be described thus: Sable a fess countercompony azure and Or between five bunches of grapes reversed slipped of the last, three and two.

The composition of Langenlonsheim's arms is based on old 15th-century village seals. The fess countercompony (horizontal stripe with the two-row chequered pattern) was inspired by the arms formerly borne by the Counts of Sponheim, who held the area for many centuries. Their arms were actually a whole shield covered in this pattern. The fess stands between five charges, each one a bunch of grapes. These symbolize winegrowing's importance to Langenlonsheim. The tinctures of sable and or (black and gold) were inspired by the Palatinate's traditional arms. The arms have been borne since 1938.

=== Town partnerships ===
Langenlonsheim fosters partnerships with the following places:

- Potton, Bedfordshire, England, United Kingdom since 1986

== Culture and sightseeing ==
=== Buildings ===
The following are listed buildings or sites in Rhineland-Palatinate's Directory of Cultural Monuments:

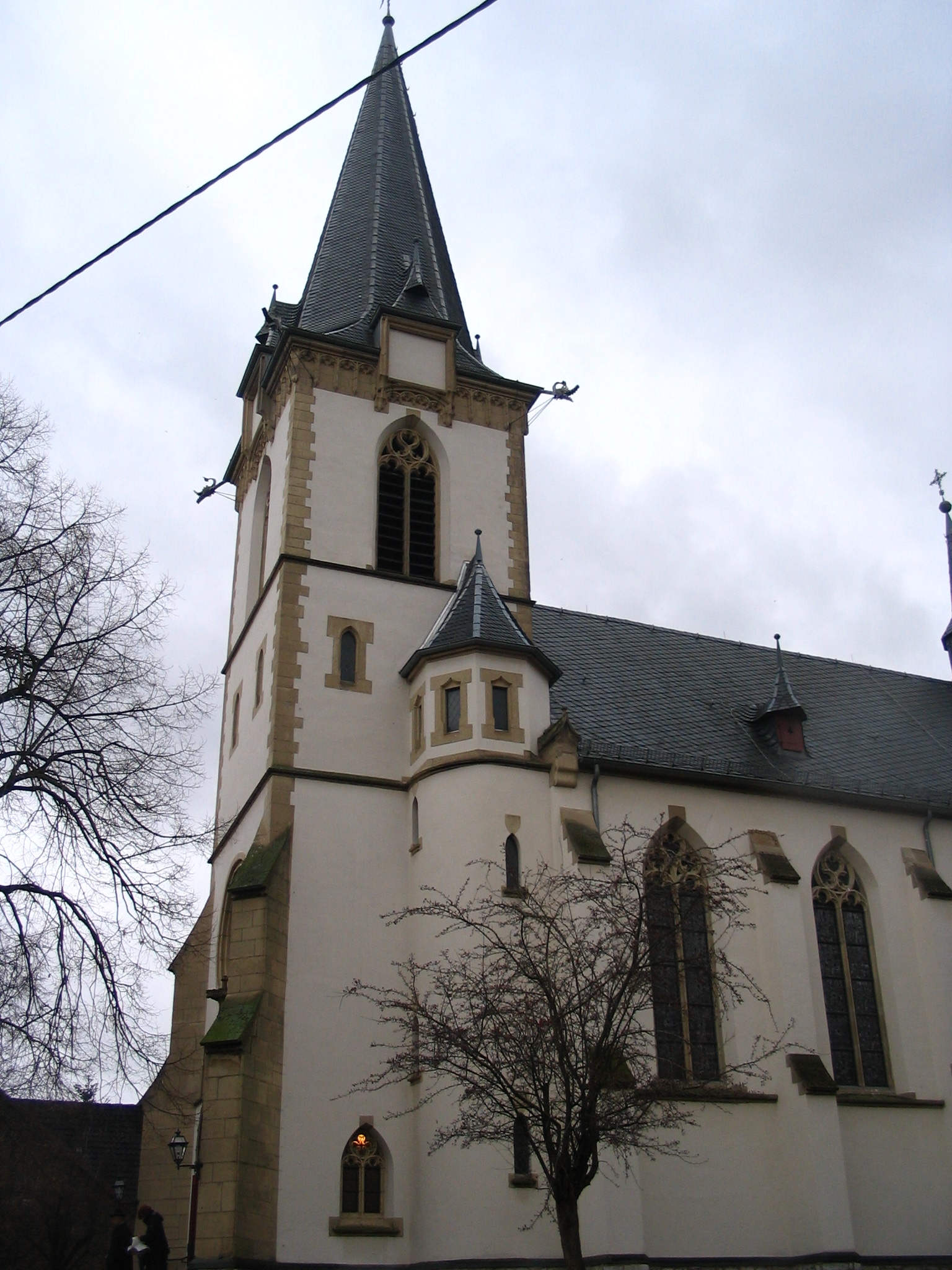
Untere Grabenstraße – Saint John the Baptist's Catholic Parish Church

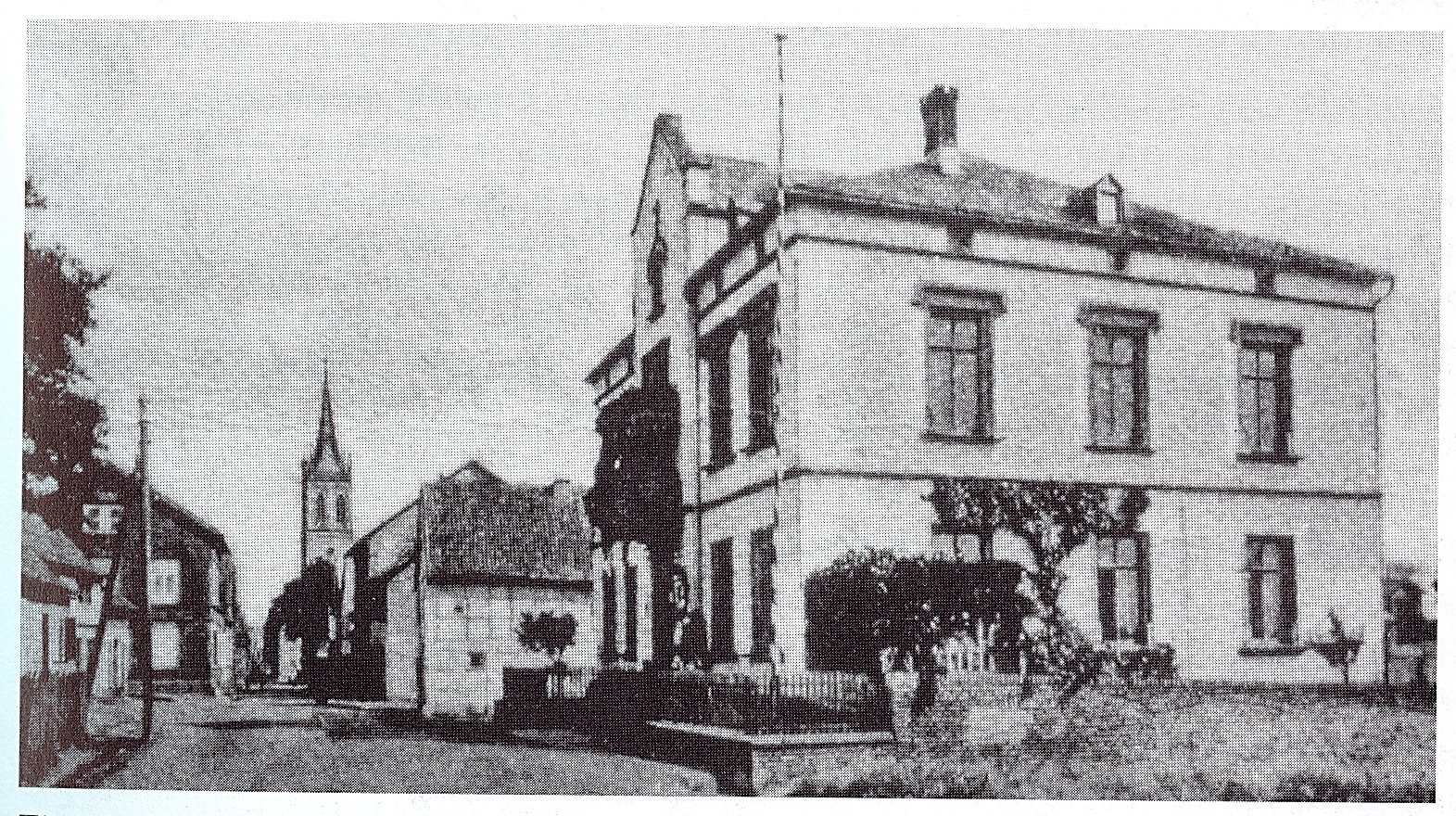
The Gothic Revival Bürgermeisterei administration building built in 1877/1878 (architect Carl Conradi)

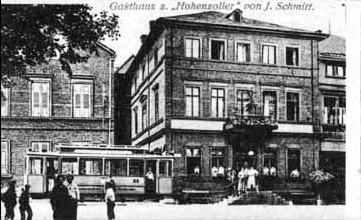
Naheweinstraße 101 – The Gasthaus "Zum Hohenzollern", a former inn, as it appeared on a 1902 postcard

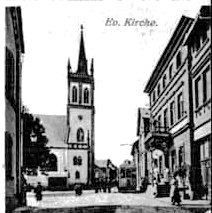
The Gothic Revival Evangelical parish church built in 1868 (architect Carl Conradi)

- Evangelical parish church, Naheweinstraße 96 – Late Gothic quire, about 1500, vestry, 1588, partly Romanesque; Late Baroque aisleless church, 1777, Classicist-Gothic Revival lengthening, 1867/1868, District Master Builder Conradi, Kreuznach
- Saint John the Baptist's Catholic Parish Church (Pfarrkirche St. Johannes der Täufer), Untere Grabenstraße – Late Gothic Revival aisleless church, 1907/1908, architect Josef Kleesattel, Düsseldorf
- Friedhofstraße, graveyard – graveyard gate, Classicist, mid 19th century; M. Eich tomb, Neoclassical stele with relief, about 1924; Pies tomb, Historicized stele, about 1868/1872; Sara Muff tomb, stele with antique design, about 1862; Joh. Nic. Lorenz tomb, Gothicized stele, about 1861; M. Lorenz tomb, Stele crowned with an urn in a fenced-in complex, about 1900
- Heddesheimer Straße – warriors' memorial 1914-1918, granite cube, about 1930
- Heddesheimer Straße, graveyard – Family Müller (hereditary estate, Tesch) tombs: in a small complex, about 1865 and 1928; M. Müller tomb, Late Classicist grave column
- Heumarkt 11 – three-sided estate; timber-frame house, partly solid, 18th or early 19th century
- Hintergasse 21 – one-and-a-half-floor timber-frame house, partly solid, 16th century (?)
- Hintergasse 22 – estate complex; one-and-a-half-floor timber-frame house, essentially from the 18th century, brickwork about 1900
- Naheweinstraße 9 – former Mühle Kloninger (mill); four-wing complex, red-sandstone-block buildings, early to latter half of the 19th century
- Naheweinstraße 90 – Baroque building with half-hip roof, timber framing plastered and slated, possibly from the earlier half of the 18th century
- Naheweinstraße 97 – Closheim winery; Historicized brick building, marked 1867
- Naheweinstraße 101 – former Gasthaus "Zum Hohenzollern" (inn); Late Classicist house, about 1860/1870
- Naheweinstraße 109 – estate complex; plastered timber-frame house, 18th or early 19th century
- Naheweinstraße 109 – Baroque timber-frame house, plastered, possibly from the 18th century
- Naheweinstraße 112 – shophouse; timber-frame about 1700
- Naheweinstraße 115 – estate complex; Baroque timber-frame house, partly solid, 18th century
- Naheweinstraße 122 – estate complex; timber-frame house, partly solid, marked 1585
- Naheweinstraße 130 – three-sided estate; gateway arch marked 1711; Baroque building with half-hip roof, timber framing plastered and slated, marked 1843; Baroque side building, partly timber-frame
- Naheweinstraße 131 – timber-frame house, partly solid, essentially possibly from the 18th century
- Naheweinstraße 133 – three-sided estate; Baroque timber-frame house, partly solid, 18th century
- Naheweinstraße 137 – Baroque timber-frame house, partly solid, about 1700, gateway arch marked 1712
- Naheweinstraße 142 – Evangelical rectory; stately Late Classicist façade, about 1840/1850
- Naheweinstraße 143 – timber-frame house with access balcony, possibly from the 17th century
- Naheweinstraße 169 – estate complex; timber-frame house, partly solid, earlier half of the 19th century
- Naheweinstraße 195 – Höhn-Zimmermann winery; one-and-a-half-floor brick villa, mixed forms Late Classicist/Renaissance Revival, latter half of the 19th century; winepress marked 1797
- Naheweinstraße 209 – former winery (?); long Gründerzeit plastered façade, about 1880/1890
- Naheweinstraße 131–147 (monumental zone) – closed building structure with one- and two-floor houses, partly timber-frame or clinker brick façades
- Jewish graveyard (monumental zone) – area with 46 gravestones from 1868/1869 to 1938 (see also below)

=== Jewish graveyard ===
Records bear witness to the Jewish graveyard in Langenlonsheim as far back as 1742. The graveyard's area comprises 2 521 m^{2}, and this is bordered by a wooden fence. Striking is the more lavish and bigger gravesite of the wine-dealing family Natt. The last burial at the graveyard took place in May 1938 (Regina Kahn née Sommer, d. 5 May 1938). Preserved here are 45 gravestones, some of which are heavily weathered or now only partially readable. All that is left of several is the pedestal. The graveyard lies in part of the Langenlonsheim forest rather far from the village itself (rural cadastral name "In den Judenkirchhofschlägen"). Not far off, but bordering both the forest and vineyards, lie the Waldhilbersheim (roughly 30 m away) and Windesheim (roughly 500 m away) Jewish graveyards.

=== Synagogue ===
At first, there was a prayer room available to Langenlonsheim's Jewish residents in one of the community's houses. One such place was mentioned in 1823. Beginning in the 1840s, the village's Jews wanted to build themselves a synagogue, and in 1856, Samuel Weiss managed to acquire a plot on Hintergasse (a lane) for just such a thing. It is believed that the synagogue was built about 1860, for the building is shown in the 1863 cadastral plan. It was a simple plastered building built out of brick and quarrystone. There was seating inside for roughly 50 worshippers, and there was a women's gallery. For some 70 years, the synagogue was the hub of Jewish life in Langenlonsheim. On Kristallnacht (9–10 November 1938), the synagogue was overrun by Nazi thugs from within Langenlonsheim and without. Doors, windows and the indoor furnishings (pews, the bimah, cabinets, tables, chairs, the ark and so on) were broken up, the floor was torn out and the walls were damaged. The Judaica, including three Torah scrolls, three sets of silver ceremonial jewellery, two silver candlesticks, an eternal lamp, a menorah and more were destroyed or stolen. On 24 April 1940, Rudolf Mayer, a Jew still living in Langenlonsheim, was forced to sell the synagogue for only 427.50 ℛℳ to a non-Jewish private citizen as the Jewish community found itself undergoing dissolution. In 1950, the sale was annulled, whereupon there was a change in ownership. In 1958, the synagogue building was torn down. Another building was built on the plot. The synagogue stood where the building whose address is Hintergasse 30 now stands.

=== Regular events ===
Once each year, Langenlonsheim holds a wine festival and a kermis (church consecration festival).

=== Sport and leisure ===
Found in Langenlonsheim are an outdoor swimming pool, a football pitch and an aerodrome. This last facility, the Flugplatz Langenlonsheim, offers opportunities for gliding, motorized flight and balloon flight. The Verein Aero-Club Rhein-Nahe, which operates out of the aerodrome, is Rhineland-Palatinate's second biggest flying club and had 274 members in 2010. It arose from a merger of two former flying clubs in 2008, the Flugsportverein Bad Kreuznach and the Aero-Club Bingen-Langenlonsheim. In 2007, the wrestling club Langenlonsheimer SC merged with the football club from Laubenheim to form TSV Langenlonsheim/Laubenheim ("TSV" stands for Turn- und Sportverein – gymnastic and sport club). There are also a fitness path (called the Trimm-Dich-Pfad – the "Trim-Yourself Path") and a Nordic walking facility, which were restored in 2006 and furnished with new equipment.

=== Clubs ===
The following clubs are active in Langenlonsheim:

- Aero-Club Rhein-Nahe e.V. — flying club
- Angelsportverein Langenlonsheim/Laubenheim — angling club
- Bauern- und Winzerverband — farmers' and winegrowers' association
- BdP Pfadfinder-Förderkreis — scout/guide promotional association
- DRK Ortsverband Langenlonsheim — German Red Cross, local chapter
- Evangelische Frauenhilfe — Evangelical women's aid
- Evangelischer Kirchenchor — Evangelical church choir
- Evangelische Kirchengemeinde — Evangelical church community
- Förderverein Kita Schatzkiste Langenlonsheim — daycare centre promotional association
- Förderverein Regionale Schule im Nahetal e.V. — Regionale Schule promotional association
- Förderverein Seniorenzentrum der VG Lalo e.V. — seniors' centre promotional association
- Förderverein St. Johannes der Täufer Langenlonsheim-Laubenheim e.V. — Saint John the Baptist's promotional association
- Freiwillige Feuerwehr Langenlonsheim 1902 — volunteer fire brigade
- Freizeitmaler — leisure painters
- Freunde und Förderer der Grundschule e.V. — primary school promotional association
- Freundeskreis des evangelischen Kindergartens — Evangelical kindergarten promotional association
- Gemischter Chor des KMGV 1877 e.V. Langenlonsheim — Kölner Männer-Gesang-Verein mixed choir
- Hilfe für Tschernobyl e.V. Langenlonsheim — aid for Chernobyl
- Karnevalfreunde — Shrovetide Carnival (Fastnacht) club
- Katholischer Kirchenchor "Cäcilia" — Catholic church choir
- Katholische Kirchengemeinde — Catholic church community
- Landfrauenverein — countrywomen's club
- Musikverein 1921 e.V. — music club
- Partnerschaftskreis Langenlonsheim-Potton — Langenlonsheim-Potton partnership circle
- Pierothchor — choir
- Sängervereinigung — singers' association
- Schützenverein 1963 e.V. — shooting sport club
- Tani Projekt - Zukunft für Kinder in Kambodscha e.V. —
- Tennis-Club-Rot-Weiß
- TSV Langenlonsheim/Laubenheim — gymnastic and sport club
- TV Langenlonsheim 1994 e.V. — gymnastic club
- VdK Bretzenheim und Umgebung — social advocacy group local chapter (Bretzenheim and area)
- Volksbildungswerk Langenlonsheim — "people's education"
- Wanderfreunde Untere Nahe e.V. — hiking club

There is also an association of the village's clubs (Ortsvereinsring).

== Economy and infrastructure ==
=== Economic structure ===
Over the years, an industrial park with firms in various fields has arisen. These include dye and lacquer production, above- and below-ground construction, wine bottling and processing, car dealerships, garden centres, fitter's shops, storage facilities and shipping companies.

=== Winegrowing ===
Langenlonsheim is considerably characterized by winegrowing and with 187 ha of planted vineyards is the Nahe wine region's biggest winegrowing centre after Bad Kreuznach, Guldental and Wallhausen. Langenlonsheim's website lists three wineries in the village. The village has also had three local ladies chosen as Wine Queen or Wine Princess: Carolin Klumb (Nahe Wine Queen 2011/2012), Maren Müller (Nahe Wine Princess 2005/2006) and Judith Honrath (Nahe Wine Queen 2001/2002 and German Wine Queen 2002/2003).

=== Transport ===
Bundesstraße 48 runs straight through the village, while the Autobahn A 61 (Koblenz–Ludwigshafen) is roughly 5 km away. Langenlonsheim can be reached by rail on the Nahe Valley Railway (Bingen–Kaiserslautern). Currently, no other railway serves Langenlonsheim station, although the now disused Hunsrückquerbahn once served the village, too. There is, however, talk of reactivating this railway as a quick transport link for Frankfurt-Hahn Airport, a former NATO military facility, Hahn Air Base, most of whose military functions ceased on 30 September 1993. Until 1 December 1938, a tramway ran from Bad Kreuznach Kornmarkt to Langenlonsheim railway station. The so-called Elektrisch ran in the early days (1911) as many as 20 times each day. At the former Kloningersmühle stop (on Langenlonsheim's outskirts), travellers from the Hunsrück could ride straight to Bad Kreuznach. Owing to shrinking ridership after the Second World War, the tram had to give way to the bus. The tracks and overhead wiring were removed.

=== Education ===
Scholastic endeavours are undertaken by the Grundschule Langenlonsheim (primary school) and the Realschule plus im Nahetal Langenlonsheim, where students can earn either the Hauptschule or the Realschule certificate.

== Famous people ==
=== Sons and daughters of the town ===
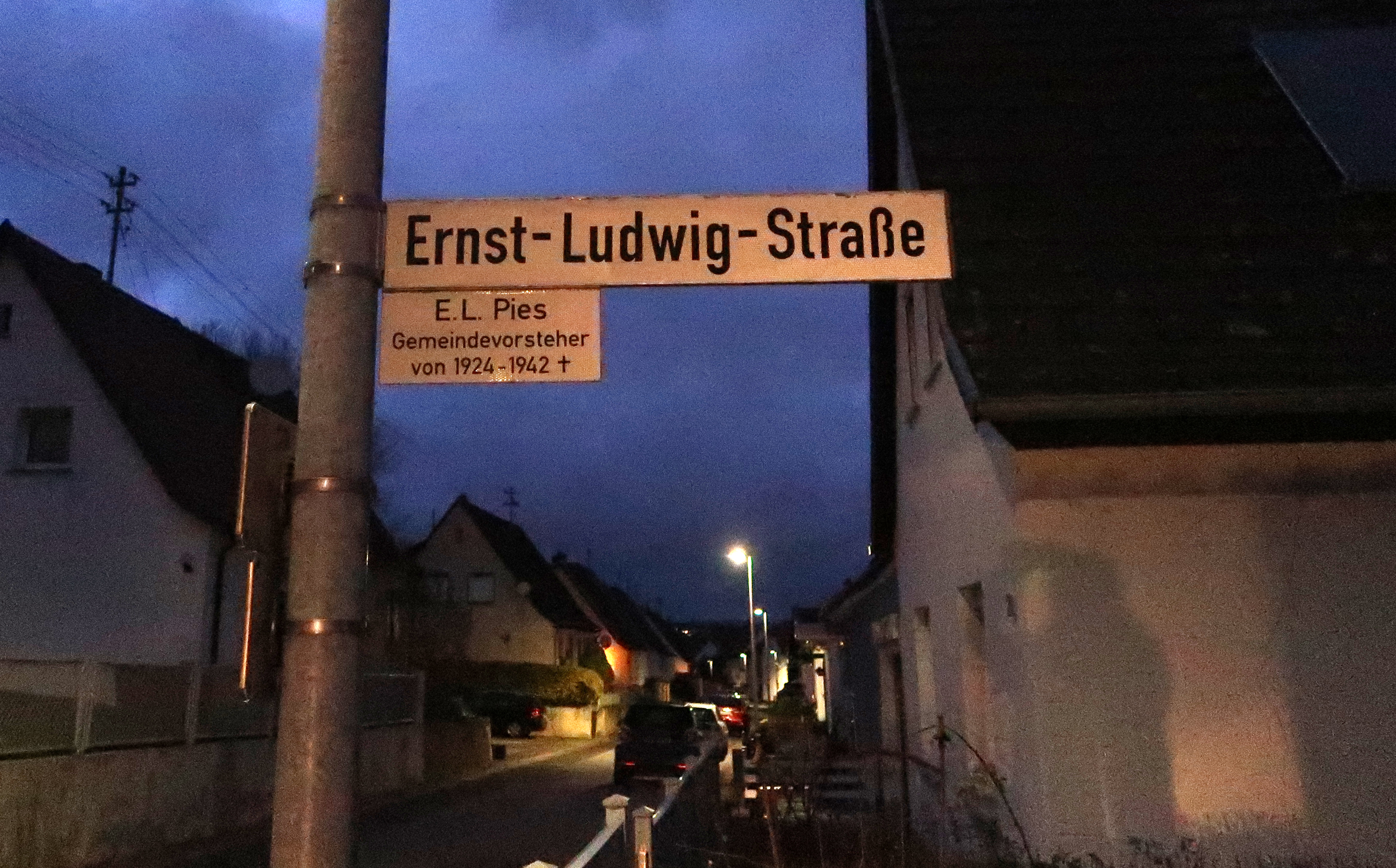
- As of 2023, a street in Langenlonsheim is still named after Ernst Ludwig Pies. While the streetsign omits the last name, the biographic caption clearly relates to Pies.
  Ernst Ludwig Pies (1885–1942), NSDAP Member of the Reichstag from Langenlonsheim
- Willi Schweinhardt (1903–1978), politician and wine estate owner

=== Famous people associated with the municipality town ===
- Matthias de Zordo (b. 21 February 1988 in Bad Kreuznach), German javelin thrower
