= Emmelshausen =

- Town
- Coat of arms

- Location of Emmelshausen within Rhein-Hunsrück-Kreis district
- Interactive map of Emmelshausen
- Location within Germany Location within Rhineland-Palatinate
- Coordinates: 50°09′19″N 7°33′6″E
- Country: Germany
- State: Rhineland-Palatinate
- District: Rhein-Hunsrück-Kreis
- Municipal assoc.: Hunsrück-Mittelrhein

Government
  - Mayor (2019–24): Volker Bernd

Area
  - Total: 8.05 km^{2} (3.11 sq mi)
- Elevation: 450 m (1,480 ft)

Population (2025-12-31)
  - Total: 4,995
  - Density: 620/km^{2} (1,610/sq mi)
- Time zone: UTC+01:00 (CET)
  - Summer (DST): UTC+02:00 (CEST)
- Postal codes: 56281
- Dialling codes: 06747
- Vehicle registration: SIM, GOA
- Website: www.emmelshausen.de

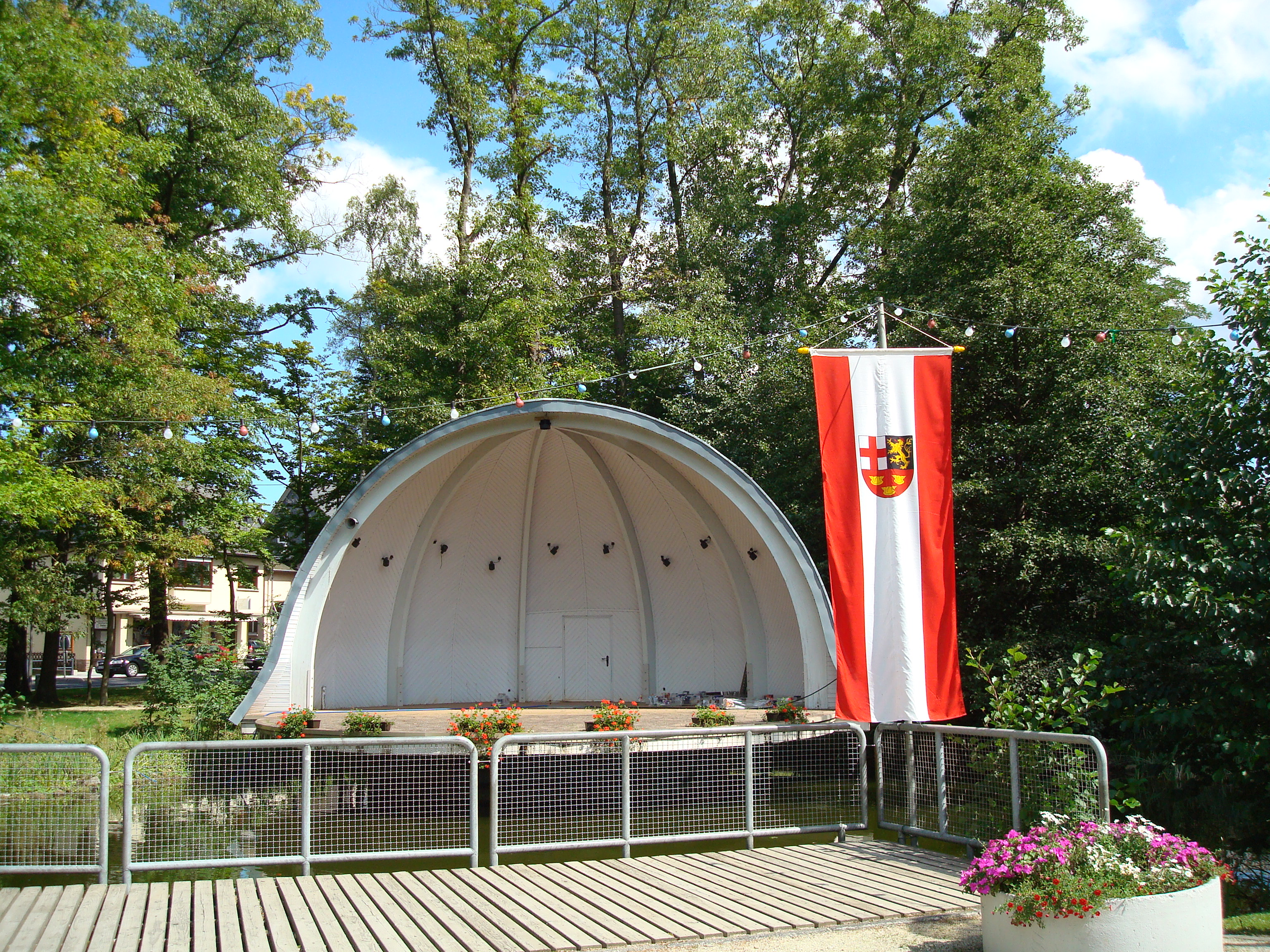
Concert shell at Park Emmelshausen, town flag

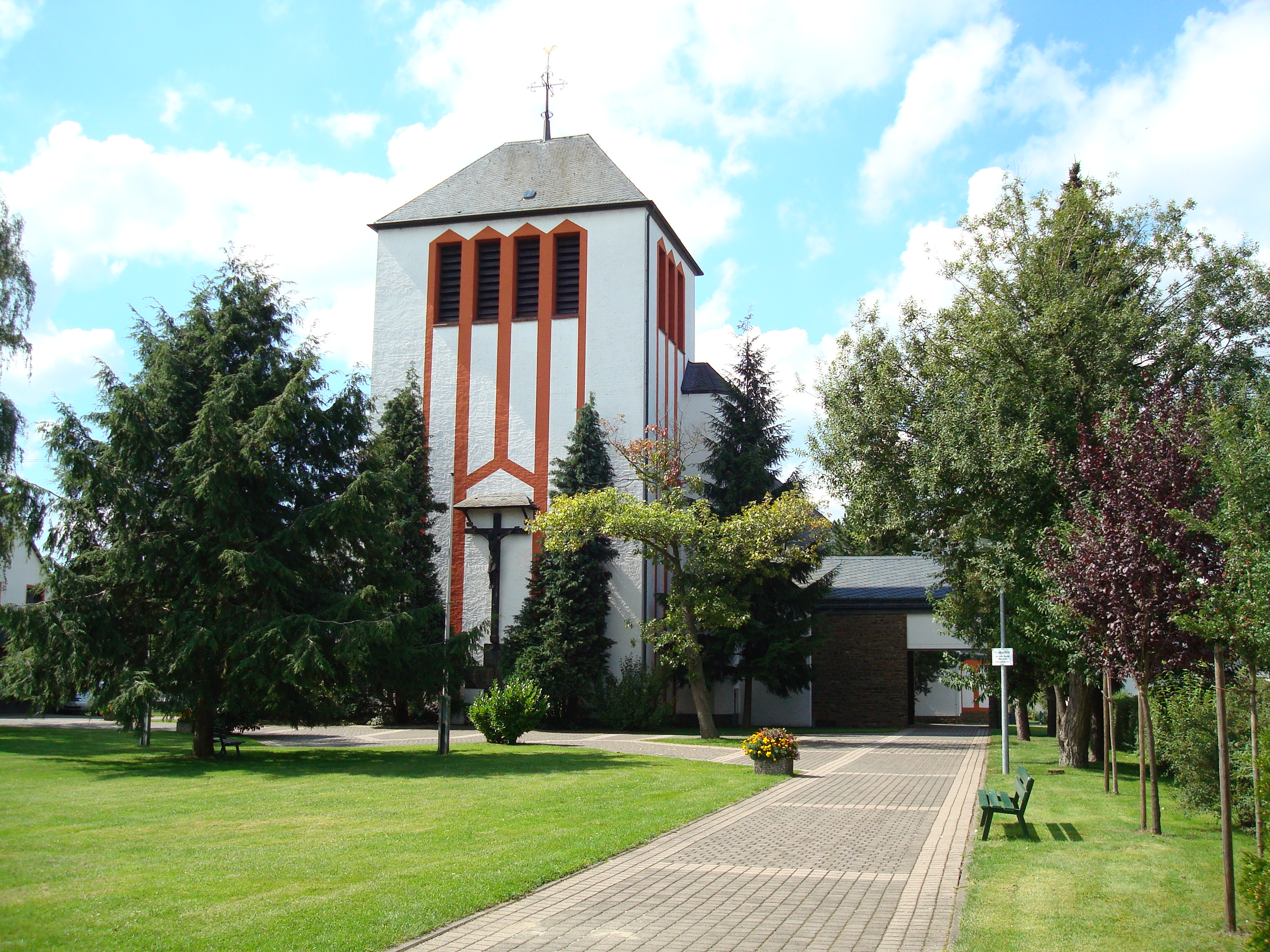
St. Hildegard, Emmelshausen

Emmelshausen (German pronunciation: [ɛml̩sˈhaʊzn̩]) is a town in the Rhein-Hunsrück-Kreis (district) in Rhineland-Palatinate, Germany. It is the seat of the Verbandsgemeinde Hunsrück-Mittelrhein, to which it also belongs. Emmelshausen is a state-recognized climatic spa (Luftkurort), and in state planning is set out as a lower centre.

== Geography ==
=== Location ===
The town lies in the Hunsrück roughly 6 km from the Rhine, south of Boppard and west of Sankt Goar.

=== Constituent communities ===
The Stadtteil of Liesenfeld lies on Emmelshausen's western town limit, on Landesstraße (State Road) 206 towards Gondershausen. It is the town's oldest centre. There is another Stadtteil called Basselscheid.

== History ==
The earliest written documents date the founding of the settlement of Liesenfeld to the 15th century. As early as the 13th century, there was within what are now Emmelshausen's limits a settlement of the same name, which over time was forsaken. In the forest east of Emmelshausen was the Gallenscheid Court's execution place. The Court's administrative seat was Castle Schöneck. In 1314, the Court was pledged by the Empire to the Electorate of Trier, but the pledge was never redeemed. Beginning in 1794, Emmelshausen lay under French rule. In 1815 it was assigned to the Kingdom of Prussia at the Congress of Vienna.

After the First World War, the municipalities of Liesenfeld, Basselscheid and Halsenbach ceded parts of their municipal areas so that the new railway station could be built in Emmelshausen. Emmelshausen became self-administering only in 1935; Liesenfeld and Basselscheid were amalgamated with the new municipality, which since 1946 has been part of the then newly founded state of Rhineland-Palatinate. In response to an application made by the Ortsgemeinde of Emmelshausen, the State Government of Rhineland-Palatinate decided on 1 September 2009 to designate Emmelshausen as a Stadt (“city”). The official act of conferral took place on 27 June 2010.

== Politics ==
=== Town council ===
The honorary mayor is chair of the council.

Elections were held in May 2014.

	SPD	CDU	FWG	Total
2014	5	11	4	20 seats
2009	5	11	4	20 seats
2004	5	13	4	22 seats

=== Mayor ===
Emmelshausen's mayor is Andrea Mallmann.

=== Coat of arms ===
The German blazon reads: In geteiltem, oben gespaltenem Schild oben rechts in Silber ein durchgehendes rotes Kreuz, oben links in Schwarz einen rotbewehrten, rot gekrönten goldenen Löwen, unten in Rot drei (2:1) goldene Merkurhüte.

The town's arms might in English heraldic language be described thus: Per fess, in chief per pale argent a cross gules and sable a lion rampant Or armed, langued and crowned of the second, and in base gules three winged petasuses of the fourth.

Fifteen years after its modern founding, Emmelshausen was granted a coat of arms. It symbolizes the merger of the two centres of Basselscheid and Liesenfeld into the much newer railway centre of Emmelshausen. The two fields in the upper part of the escutcheon each refer to one of the older centres. The red cross on the silver field on the dexter (armsbearer's right, viewer's left) side stands for Basselscheid by referring to its former mediaeval allegiance to the Electorate of Trier, which bore this armorial device. Likewise, the charge on the sinister (armsbearer's left, viewer's right) side, the lion rampant, was the armorial device borne by the Electorate of the Palatinate, to which Liesenfeld belonged until the 18th century. Indeed, the Trier Cross and the Palatine Lion are to be found in many modern German coats of arms in regions where these two bodies held sway. Below the line of partition stands a charge that is symbolic of not only the merger of the three centres, but also of this young town's quick development. It is three petasuses such as the one worn by the Roman god Mercury, complete with wings. Mercury is also not only a reference to the swiftness of the town's economic growth and steadily rising population, but also a reference to how these things came about, namely through the location of trade and industry in the town, rather than the practice of agriculture and handicraft industries that characterized so many other small places in the Hunsrück.

The arms have been borne since 1950.

=== Town partnerships ===
Emmelshausen fosters partnerships with the following places:

- Luzy, Nièvre, France since 1985

== Culture and sightseeing ==
In the field of culture, the Verbandsgemeinde of Emmelshausen is a centrepoint for the whole Rhine-Moselle Triangle. More than 20,000 spectators visit the Zentrum am Park (“Centre at the Park”) each year. The Kulturkreis Region Emmelshausen is with more than 2,200 members Rhineland-Palatinate's biggest cultural club, and its seat is in Emmelshausen. In the field of visual arts, a group known as die Wiebelsborner is very active.

=== Buildings ===
The following are listed buildings or sites in Rhineland-Palatinate’s Directory of Cultural Monuments:

==== Emmelshausen (main centre) ====
- Bahnhofstraße 12 – railway station on the Hunsrückbahn, 1908; reception building, partly quarrystone, one-and-a-half-floor storage and loading hall, partly timber-frame, railway facilities and tracks
- Simmerner Straße 15 – one-floor wood-sided house, 20th century; whole complex of buildings with garden
- Hunsrückbahn (monumental zone) – part of the line built between 1906 and 1908, one of the Prussian State Railway’s steepest stretches of line

==== Basselscheid ====
- Saint Lucy’s Catholic Chapel (Kapelle St. Lucia), Kapellenweg 2 – brick aisleless church, marked 1896
- Baybachstraße 8 – estate complex, mid 19th century, whole complex of buildings; timber-frame house, partly slated, timber-frame barn

==== Liesenfeld ====
- Rhein-Mosel-Straße 107 – Quereinhaus (a combination residential and commercial house divided for these two purposes down the middle, perpendicularly to the street), about 1860
- Chapel, north of Liesenfeld, near the Baunhöllermühle (mill) – aisleless church, 19th century

=== Clubs ===
About 100 clubs make for a great number of local festivals and events, thereby contributing to social coöperation and the practice of customs.

== Economy and infrastructure ==
=== Transport ===
Emmelshausen train station

Emmelshausen is the terminus of the Hunsrückbahn (RB37), (railway), which begins in Boppard. Passenger transport is operated by Rhenus Veniro GmbH & Co. KG. Emmelshausen is located in the area of the transport association Verkehrsverbund Rhein-Mosel (VRM), zone number 603.
