= Schöneberg, Bad Kreuznach =

Schöneberg
- Municipality
- Coat of arms

- Location of Schöneberg within Bad Kreuznach district
- Interactive map of Schöneberg
- Location within Germany Location within Rhineland-Palatinate
- Coordinates: 49°55′24″N 07°45′18″E
- Country: Germany
- State: Rhineland-Palatinate
- District: Bad Kreuznach
- Municipal assoc.: Langenlonsheim-Stromberg

Government
  - Mayor (2019–24): Heinz-Dieter Wopen

Area
  - Total: 7.13 km^{2} (2.75 sq mi)
- Elevation: 345 m (1,132 ft)

Population (2025-12-31)
  - Total: 600
  - Density: 84/km^{2} (220/sq mi)
- Time zone: UTC+01:00 (CET)
  - Summer (DST): UTC+02:00 (CEST)
- Postal codes: 55444
- Dialling codes: 06724
- Vehicle registration: KH
- Website: http://www.schoeneberg-soonwald.de/

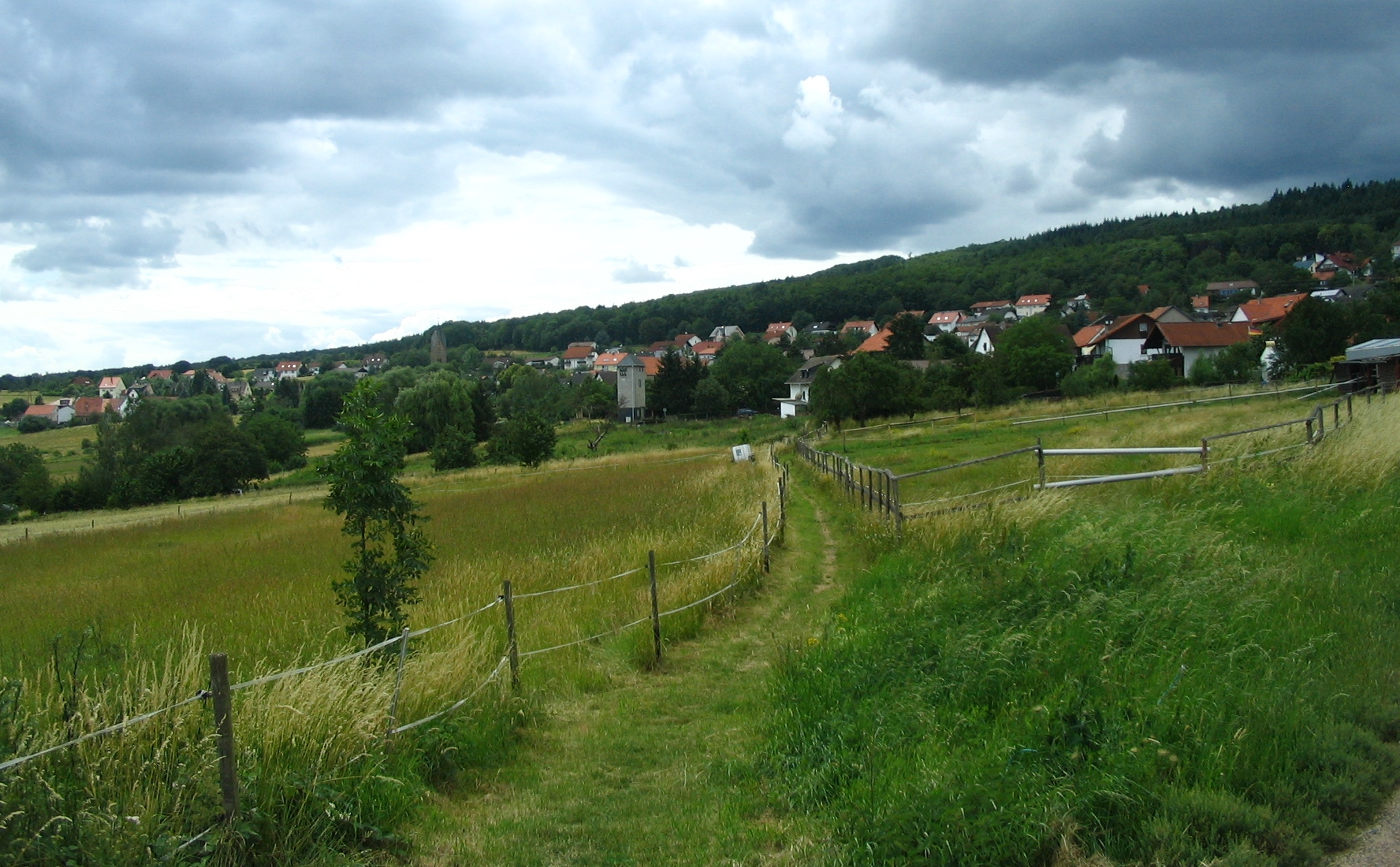
Schöneberg and the Soonwald

Schöneberg (German: [ˈʃøːnəbɛʁk]) is an Ortsgemeinde – a municipality belonging to a Verbandsgemeinde, a kind of collective municipality – in the Bad Kreuznach district in Rhineland-Palatinate, Germany. It belongs to the Verbandsgemeinde Langenlonsheim-Stromberg, whose seat is in Langenlonsheim. Schöneberg is a winegrowing village.

== Geography ==
=== Location ===
Schöneberg lies in the Hunsrück on a mountain ridge in the Soonwald between the Guldenbach and Gräfenbach valleys, roughly 10 km southwest of the River Rhine at Bingerbrück.

=== Neighbouring municipalities ===
Clockwise from the north, Schöneberg's neighbours are the municipality of Dörrebach, the town of Stromberg, and the municipalities of Schweppenhausen, Windesheim, Hergenfeld and Spabrücken, all of which likewise lie within the Bad Kreuznach district. Owing to a peculiarity in the way in which the municipal boundaries are laid out, the village site of Eckenroth, whose municipal area does not border on Schöneberg's, actually lies nearer the village site of Schöneberg than the village site of Schweppenhausen does.

== History ==
As far back as ancient times, the place where Schöneberg now lies was being used by Romans as an important way station. Proof of this comes from, among other things, the foundations of a villa rustica with a hypocaust, which were unearthed in the course of building work. The military road running by Schöneberg from Kreuznach to Koblenz later served postal coach traffic. Schöneberg thus had regular links to other places by way of the Thurn und Taxis postal riders as an Ordinari Postort, a regular stop. In 983, the village passed from Imperial ownership to the Archfoundation of Mainz and was later granted to various knightly families. A man with a link to the village, Johann von Schönenberg, even became the Archbishop-Elector of Trier and the instigator of the Trier witch trials. The von Schonenburg lordly family built the first castle house in 1539, on whose foundations their descendants built a newer one that still stands today in 1686. The earlier house had also been Johann von Schönenberg's childhood home. Later, the village passed to the Palatinate, who enfeoffed the Counts of Ingelheim with it. This lordship ended when French Revolutionary troops came marching into the region.

=== The Schöneberg postal road ===
The postal road corresponded along much of its length with the former Roman road. It was the so-called Niederländischer Postkurs (Dutch Postal Route), which led from Simmern over the heights of the Hunsrück to Seibersbach, Dörrebach, Schöneberg, Hergenfeld, the Breitenfelser-Hof and Kreuznach. Schöneberg has this situation to thank for its being an Ordinari Postort from the 14th century until about 1630. That is to say that Schöneberg was regularly served by postal riders and postal coaches, whereas nearby Stromberg, as an Extraordinäri Postort, was only served from Schöneberg on request. Only sometime between 1620 and 1632 was the postal service transferred from Schöneberg to Stromberg, for it is known that by that time that there was a postmaster in Stromberg.

=== Schöneberg as a castle village ===
Schöneberg is what in German is called an unechter Burgort ("false castle village"), meaning that the village and the castle actually developed apart from each other; it was thus not a case of a castle giving rise to a village outside its walls. Nonetheless, it must be borne in mind that a village in the Middle Ages was not what is commonly imagined today as a village. Most villages were made up of some 30 straw-thatched houses. The streets were unpaved and had open sewage drains. Most had a village well open to everyone and also a firepond. This description of a village held true into the 18th century and only slowly did it change in the 19th century. Schöneberg's beginnings may have arisen at what is now the village's northern outskirts, whereas the castle complex only arose later and about one kilometre to the west. The old Schöneberg churchyard was mentioned in 1577 and lay on what is today the Kreisstraße that leads to Eckenroth, at the corner of Höller Weg. It was until the 17th century the graveyard for the whole parish area of Schöneberg and Hergenfeld. However, as the village slowly grew towards the castle and the castle church became the parish church sometime about 1700, the people reverted to the old tradition of burying their dead around the church. In 1895, the old church (originally the castle church) was torn down and the site turned into a burying ground. After further expansions, today's graveyard eventually arose. The shift towards the castle was hardly groundless: people obviously felt safer from robbers and bandits if they were near a castle.

=== The Lords of Schönenberg ===
From 1504 to 1581, the local Amtmann, the highest official in the Amt of Stromberg, was furnished by the Lords of Schönenberg:

- 1504-1509: Phillipp von Schönenberg
- 1509-1530: Johann von Schönenberg
- 1530-1542: Diether von Schönenberg
- 1542-1552: Reichard Greifenclau zu Vollrads, Diether von Schönenberg's son-in-law
- 1552-1581: Hans Valentin von Schönenberg

Hans Valentin zu Schönenberg was first mentioned in 1552 as a Palatine Amtmann at Stromberg. No later than 1560, he was enfeoffed with the Lordship of Schöneberg. Whether Hans Valentin zu Schönenberg appointed the first Protestant clergyman to Schöneberg of his own will or at Electoral Palatinate's behest is unclear. What is clear, however, from the fact that he sent two of his sons to study at the University of Marburg in 1568, is that at this time, he stood squarely on the Protestant side. Hans Valentin zu Schönenberg had a brother, Johann von Schönenberg. He was the cathedral provost at Trier, Stadthalter ("steward") for the city of Trier, rector of the University of Trier and, as Johann VII, the Archbishop-Elector of Trier from 1581 to 1599 and a steadfast follower of the old belief (Catholicism) who unforbearingly banned the Protestants from Trier. In 1602, Archbishop-Elector of Mainz enfeoffed Hans Reichard von Schönenberg with Schöneberg and Hergenfeld for himself, as the eldest, and his brother's underage sons. After the Schönenbergs died out in the male line in 1632, the Counts of Schönburg at Oberwesel became the fiefholders.

=== Jewish history ===
Schöneberg had a small Jewish community in the 19th century. Jews were first mentioned as being in the village in the 16th century: sometime about 1548 or 1550, a protection money payment list named the village's Jews. It read in part:

In amptem Stromberg beckellum und Crutzennach. Menche von Schonberg sol geben v. fl. halb bart und halb martini...

"Menche" was a short form of the given name "Menachem" ("מנחם"); he was to pay five Rhenish guilders in two instalments through the year. Nevertheless, the number of Jews then in the village was quite small. In 1808, there were 15 Jewish inhabitants in Schöneberg, and 26 in 1858, out of a total of 587 inhabitants. Also belonging to the Schöneberg Jewish community were the Jews living in Hergenfeld and Spabrücken, which in 1858 amounted to 10 and 15 inhabitants respectively. By 1895, the number of Jewish inhabitants in Schöneberg had shrunk to 4. Living in Spabrücken, meanwhile, were 21. In 1925, only two were still living in Schöneberg, while there were 8 in Spabrücken and none in Hergenfeld. It is believed that by the late 19th century, Spabrücken's Jewish inhabitants belonged to the Argenschwang community. In the way of institutions, there were presumably a prayer room at one of the Jewish houses and a graveyard. After 1933, when Adolf Hitler and the Nazis came to power, only one Jew still lived in Schöneberg, an invalid named Simon Michel (b. 1897 in Hettenleidelheim; named in the 1939 book of inhabitants) who was deported to Riga and died. According to the Gedenkbuch – Opfer der Verfolgung der Juden unter der nationalsozialistischen Gewaltherrschaft in Deutschland 1933-1945 ("Memorial Book – Victims of the Persecution of the Jews under National Socialist Tyranny") and Yad Vashem, of all Jews who either were born in Spabrücken or lived there for a long time, five were the victims of Nazi persecution (birthdates in brackets):

1. Isaak Schwarz (1879)
2. Karoline Schwarz (1874)
3. Leo Schwarz (1872)
4. Theodor Schwarz (1883)
5. Leopold Wolf (1865)

== Religion ==
As at 31 January 2014, there are 633 full-time residents in Schöneberg, and of those, 157 are Evangelical (24.803%), 345 are Catholic (54.502%), 9 (1.422%) belong to other religious groups and 122 (19.273%) either have no religion or will not reveal their religious affiliation.

== Politics ==
=== Municipal council ===
The council is made up of 12 council members, who were elected by proportional representation at the municipal election held on 7 June 2009, and the honorary mayor as chairman. The twelve seats are shared by two voters' groups.

=== Mayor ===
Schöneberg's mayor is H.-D. Wopen, and his deputies are L. C. Baumgärtner and M. Essner.

=== Coat of arms ===
The municipality's arms might be described thus: Per fess enhanced sable three crosses pattée argent and per pale gules a wheel spoked of six of the second and sable a lion rampant Or armed, langued and crowned of the third.

Schöneberg's history is shown in condensed form in its coat of arms. The three crosses seen in the upper field are an heraldic device once borne by the Knights of Schonenburg, while below this on the dexter (armsbearer's right, viewer's left) side is the Wheel of Mainz, and on the sinister (armsbearer's left, viewer's right) side, the Palatine Lion.

== Culture and sightseeing ==
=== Buildings ===
The following are listed buildings or sites in Rhineland-Palatinate's Directory of Cultural Monuments:

- Catholic Church of the Exaltation of the Holy Cross (Kirche zur Kreuzauffindung), Schlossstraße 1 – Late Romanesque Revival hall church, quarrystone, 1895, architects Carl Rüdell and Richard Odenthal
- Hauptstraße 23 – estate complex; lordly Late Classicist building with half-hip roof, partly timber-frame, marked 1843; stable and barn addition in the manner of an estate complex along the street; further long side building, 19th century
- At Hauptstraße 37 – spolia, Renaissance portal lintel, marked 1568
- Near Hauptstraße 52 – wayside cross, Late Baroque, from the latter half of the 18th century
- Near Schlossstraße 3 – village fountain, 18th or 19th century, restoration possibly in the 1920s
- Schlossstraße 4 – house, gate complex, Baroque timber-frame house, partly solid, half-hip roof, marked 1688
- Schlossstraße 5 – former castle house; building with half-hip roof, possibly from 1539, conversion possibly in 1686, ringwall remnants
- Schlossstraße 5–11, 8–12 (monumental zone) – area of the former palatial residence of the Lords of Schöneberg (no. 5, 16th century); village's early seed centre separated from the rest of the built-up area by the graveyard with today six estate complexes grouped around a yard from the 16th century to the first fourth of the 20th century
- Forsthaus Neupfalz (forester's house), on Landesstraße 240, northwest of the village – group of buildings in Heimatstil, about 1905
- Jewish graveyard, south of the village (monumental zone) – area with five gravestones from the 19th century and the early 20th century (see also below)

==== The former school building, now community centre ====
The former school in Schöneberg was built on a meadow in 1826 by Master Mason Jakob Schweigert from Schöneberg to plans by Master Builder Bär from Kreuznach. The schoolroom was upstairs with two small, north-facing rooms, and downstairs was the teacher's dwelling. In 1893, an addition was built onto the schoolhouse's west side, containing the two schoolrooms, a cellar, a storehouse, the stairwell and for each teacher's dwelling a small room. In 1989, today's community centre came into being through the expansion and conversion of what had until now been the school building.

=== Jewish graveyard ===
The time when the Jewish graveyard in Schöneberg arose is unknown. Only four gravestones are still preserved, dating from between 1885 and 1924. The graveyard covers an area of 1,362 m^{2}. From the graveyard's size it seems clear that the dead from surrounding Jewish communities (Hergenfeld and Spabrücken) were also buried here. In the time of the Third Reich, it is believed that the graveyard was largely removed. Some of the gravestones might have disappeared under weed overgrowth. After 1945, the graveyard was reinstated as far as was then possible. It lies roughly one kilometre south of the village centre in the area called "Auf dem Gerstenberg" near the Windesheimer Wald (forest) and can be reached by a farm lane that branches off the road to Hergenfeld (not far from the crossing near the sporting ground) eastwards towards the edge of the forest.

=== Regular events ===
Each year on 3 May, the Feast of the Exaltation of the Holy Cross, Schöneberg holds its kermis (church consecration festival). If the feast day falls on a weekday, the kermis is held on the following Sunday and Monday.

=== Sport and leisure ===
Found on the Neupfalz, between Schöneberg and Stromberg is the Wald-Erlebniszentrum Soonwald ("Soonwald Forest Adventure Centre"). Lying in the middle of the forest, it offers visitors the opportunity for an intensive nature experience. Both for school and youth groups and for adults and families, the offerings include one-day or several-day programmes in environmental education as applied to woodlands and forest adventures. The forestry office's 9,000 or so hectares of woods allow visitors a hands-on experience. Furthermore, there are facilities available for use, such as the forest laboratory, the forest workshop and the Internet room with its adjoining library. Only a stone's throw from the Centre, just short of Dörrebach, is a locality called the Lehnmühle (historically a mill). Apart from a few houses, what predominates here is agriculture. Worth experiencing above all else is the homemade cheese, which is known far beyond the municipality's limits and is prized by gourmets. Schöneberg also has a grilling pavilion, a bowls pitch and a community centre.

=== Clubs ===
The following clubs are active in Schöneberg:

- MGV Liederkranz e.V. Schöneberg — men's singing club
- Freunde der Feuerwehr Schöneberg e.V. — fire brigade promotional association
- Schöneberger Schloßtheater e.V. — theatrical group

== Economy and infrastructure ==
=== Economic structure ===
Besides the customary agriculture, whose yields were rather scant, Schöneberg villagers of the past also busied themselves as broomsquires. Many inhabitants, not only of Schöneberg but of the whole Hunsrück region, emigrated to Canada and the United States. More recently, the villagers have concentrated on other crafts such as automotive, electric, hairdressing, roofing and carpentry. There are likewise shopping opportunities for daily needs at the little village shop. Vehicle-based businesses also visit the village from nearby bakeries and butcher's shops. Financial services are covered, albeit only partly, by the local insurance agencies.

=== Transport ===
Running through Schöneberg is Kreisstraße 29, known locally as Hauptstraße ("Main Street"), which is met by Kreisstraße 45, known locally as Neupfälzer Straße ("New Palatine Street"), in the village's west end. Kreisstraße 29 leads eastwards to the interchange onto the Autobahn A 61 (Koblenz–Ludwigshafen) at Waldlaubersheim. There are bus links from Schöneberg by route 244 to Bad Kreuznach in one direction and Spabrücken, Argenschwang and Münchwald in the other. Schöneberg is not conveniently placed for any railway. Nevertheless, serving Bad Kreuznach, which can be reached by bus, is a railway station on the Nahe Valley Railway (Bingen–Saarbrücken). Branching off here is also the railway line to Gau Algesheim. From Bingen am Rhein, Regionalbahn trains run by way of the Alsenz Valley Railway, which branches off the Nahe Valley Railway in Bad Münster am Stein, to Kaiserslautern, reaching it in roughly 65 minutes. Running on the line to Saarbrücken and by way of Gau Algesheim and the West Rhine Railway to Mainz are Regional-Express and Regionalbahn trains. The travel time to Mainz lies between 25 and 40 minutes, and to Saarbrücken between 1 hour and 40 minutes and 2 hours and 20 minutes. Schöneberg may soon have a more convenient rail service if the plans to reactivate the Cross-Hunsrück Railway (Hunsrückquerbahn), which runs through neighbouring Stromberg, meet with success. This would afford quick access not only to Mainz, in one direction, but also to Frankfurt-Hahn Airport in the other.

=== Winegrowing ===
Schöneberg's preferred vineyard locations have been found since yore at the edge of the Aubach or Steyerbach valley. These locations are distinguished mainly by their cultivation using slopes. The wines from these vineyards are mainly fruity and tangy. For years, however, the number of winemakers has fast been falling. The two locations known as Schäfersley and Sonnenberg lie at the northern edge of the Nahe wine region and belong to the winemaking appellation – Großlage – Pfarrgarten. Winegrowing was brought to the region by the Romans.

=== Education ===
Schöneberg has no educational institutions of its own. Both the daycare centre and the primary school (grade levels 1 to 4) are to be found in Schweppenhausen, about 4 km away. After primary school, children may be enrolled at the all-day school in Stromberg. There are also secondary schools in nearby places:

- Stromberg: Integrierte Gesamtschule (IGS)
- Wallhausen: Realschule plus Geschwister-Scholl-Schule
- Hargesheim: Gesamtschule Alfred-Delp-Schule
- Bad Kreuznach: Realschule an der Heidenmauer
- Bad Kreuznach: Gymnasium an der Stadtmauer (Stama)
- Bad Kreuznach: Lina-Hilger-Gymnasium (Lihi)
- Bad Kreuznach: Gymnasium am Römerkastell (Röka)

=== Public institutions ===
Schöneberg has a municipal public library, a community centre and a volunteer fire brigade with a promotional association.
