= Dörrebach =

- Municipality
- Coat of arms

- Location of Dörrebach within Bad Kreuznach district
- Interactive map of Dörrebach
- Location within Germany Location within Rhineland-Palatinate
- Coordinates: 49°56′43″N 7°43′14″E
- Country: Germany
- State: Rhineland-Palatinate
- District: Bad Kreuznach
- Municipal assoc.: Langenlonsheim-Stromberg

Government
  - Mayor (2019–24): Harald Scholl

Area
  - Total: 13.14 km^{2} (5.07 sq mi)
- Elevation: 363 m (1,191 ft)

Population (2025-12-31)
  - Total: 720
  - Density: 55/km^{2} (140/sq mi)
- Time zone: UTC+01:00 (CET)
  - Summer (DST): UTC+02:00 (CEST)
- Postal codes: 55444
- Vehicle registration: KH
- Website: https://www.xn--drrebach-n4a.de/

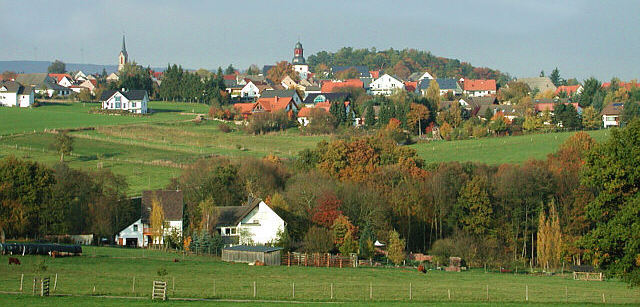
View of Dörrebach

Dörrebach is an Ortsgemeinde – a municipality belonging to a Verbandsgemeinde, a kind of collective municipality – in the Bad Kreuznach district in Rhineland-Palatinate, Germany. It belongs to the Verbandsgemeinde Langenlonsheim-Stromberg, whose seat is in Langenlonsheim.

== Geography ==
=== Location ===
Dörrebach lies in the northeast of the Soonwald, which is part of the Hunsrück not far from the seam where it meets the Binger Wald (forest). The Soonwald stretches out between the Guldenbach and the Simmerbach and with an area of 25 000 ha is after the Palatinate Forest western Germany’s second biggest contiguous woodland. In this sanctuary for red deer has been not only the Jäger aus Kurpfalz (“Hunter from Electoral Palatinate”, the subject of a well known folksong), but also the Hunsrück “national hero” – actually a robber – known as Schinderhannes, who made the place his hideout. Northwest of the village, beyond the Hochsteinchen (a mountain) lies Rheinböllen, while to the southeast lies Stromberg. Dörrebach lies on the northwest side of the widely wooded and hilly Bad Kreuznach district, and also within the influence of the middle centres of Bad Kreuznach and Bingen. The municipal area measures 13.14 km² (of which 2.36 km² is wooded) and has an average elevation of 370 m above sea level, while the municipality’s highest elevation, called the Kipp, is 408.3 m above sea level. Given over to agriculture is an area of 320 ha, of which 180 ha is grassland and the other 140 ha is cropfields.

=== Neighbouring municipalities ===
Clockwise from the north, Dörrebach’s neighbours are the municipality of Seibersbach, the town of Stromberg, the municipality of Schöneberg, the municipality of Spabrücken and the municipality of Spall, all of which lie in the Bad Kreuznach district, and the municipality of Argenthal, which lies in the neighbouring Rhein-Hunsrück-Kreis.

=== Constituent communities ===
Also belonging to Dörrebach are the outlying homesteads of Forsthaus Opel, Burg Gollenfels (castle), Im Waldwinkel and Weinbergerhof.

=== Rural cadastral areas ===
It is the custom in many parts of Germany for defined areas of rural land to bear proper names, and the countryside within Dörrebach’s limits is no exception. Many of these toponyms are centuries old. Some refer to long vanished villages or hamlets that once lay in these areas, others refer to the land’s geographical characteristics, and still others refer to historic landowners. Dörrebach has a great number of named cadastral areas in its outlying rural (and to a great extent, wooded) countryside – all together 99 of them. Their names, most of which are prepositional phrases, are as follows: Am Bangert, Am Buchenweg, Am Buchenweg, Am Hahnenpfad, Am Heesbaum, Am Hellienbohr, Am Hirschbrunnen, Am Hollerpfad, Am Kapellchen, Am Schleckenacker, Am Schlosswald, Am Totenweg, Am Weigertsgraben, Am Weiher, An dem Hahn, An dem Seibersbacher Weg, An dem Streitbirnbaum, An den Horschwiesen, An der Braunewies, An der Kipp, An der Langmauer, An der Schlosswiese, An der Stehwiese, An der Straße, An der Trift, An der Wolfsgass, Auf dem Fischweiher, Auf dem Holler, Auf dem Lindenfels, Auf dem Sasset, Auf dem Schlag, Auf dem Schleckenacker, Auf dem Stemel, Auf dem Wolfshäuschen, Auf der Braunewies, Auf der Helle, Auf der Hirtenwiese, Auf der Kreuzwiese, Auf der Lay, Auf der Mauerwiese, Auf der Maushell, Auf der Maushell am Rithberg, Auf der Pfingstheide (southwest of the village), Auf der Pfingstheide (west of the village), Auf der Pfingstheidwiese, Auf der Schwann, Auf der Seibersbacher Heide, Auf der Sparrwiese, Die Mauerwiese, Hinter dem Weiher, Hinter der Kipp, Im Bangert, Im Bingelsberg, Im Dorf, Im Ebertsborn, Im Geren, Im Hobengarten, Im Kirchgarten, Im Lagerborn, Im oberen Bangert, Im Schlafbohr, Im Schloss, Im Schlossgrund, Im Schlosswald, Im unteren Bangert, Im Waldwinkel, Im Wingertsberg, In den untersten Horschwiesen, In den Adamsäckern, In den Eichäckern, In den Frühjahrsäckern, In den Geren Wusten, In den Honigäckern, In den Kreuzwiesen, In den Linnäckern, In den oberen Wiesen, In den obersten Horschwiesen, In den Schlosswiesen, In den Stolläckern, In den Strinkwiesen, In der Au, In der Bangertgewann, In der Gereheck, In der Kohlgrube, In der Langfuhr, In der Muhl, In der Neuwiese, In der oberen Au, In der Schlesheck, In der Silswiese, In der Weigertswiese, Krummäcker, Links am Mühlenweg, Neben den Horschwiesen, Neben der Flurwiese, Rechts am Mühlenweg, Unter dem Rithberg, Unter Ludwigs, Unterm Bingelsberg.

=== Geology ===
The geological parent material is mainly Devonian slate and quartzite from the Rhenish Massif. The surface is formed out of weathered slate and quartz mixed with quartzitic greywackes and loam. The mostly stony loam soil has a thickness of 0.2 to 0.8 m above the slate. In 1628, ore mining near Seibersbach had its first documentary mention when two Junker (young noblemen) from Dörrebach complained to the Archbishop of Mainz about some ironworkers at the Stromberger Neuhütte (ironworks), who together with French and Spanish soldiers had been causing damage to the woods and fields in their quest for iron ore. Also important are the limestone deposits in the eastern part of the municipal area. The Guldenbach splits the limestone into two parts, with the more westerly lying in Dörrebach, while the more easterly, called the Hunsfels, lies within Stromberg’s limits. The long axis of this limestone pod stretches some 2 km from east to west, while the north-south extent barely reaches more than 600 m. More precisely, this area begins near the Weinbergerhof and includes the whole western area of the Gollenfels. In the area of the railway station property in Stromberg, this area stretches along the left bank of the Guldenbach. In both places, the limestone deposits have been exploited commercially for decades, thereby leaving considerable scarring on the landscape. Worth noting is the way that the Dörrebach percolates into the ground along its eastern stretch, beginning under the bridge at the Weinbergerhof inn. The water is positively swallowed up by several holes, called ponors. Reportedly there are certain spots where one can even clearly hear the slurping noise made by the sinking water. This unusual occurrence can only be explained by the local geological conditions. Since 1925, the limestone pod that lies here has been called the Stromberger Karst because here, watercourses sink into the ground, flowing onwards underground, which in drier years can lead to the Dörrebach’s disappearing utterly. Some 2 km farther east, in Stromberg, there are two karst springs. The water, which here comes out of the walling on the Guldenbach’s right bank, might come from water that has sunk underground from the Dörrebach. Thus far, however, nobody has been able to prove this by dye tracing. What is odd about these springs is that the water coming out of the more voluminous one, the Kalter Steg, maintains a year-round temperature of about +5 °C, whereas the water from the other, less copious, one, only about 20 m away, the Warmbrunnen, lives up to its name, at least relatively speaking (the first syllable does indeed mean “warm”), running at a steady temperature of +17 °C. It also has a considerably lower limestone content.

== History ==
=== Antiquity ===
Just when the village of Dörrebach was founded and its church was built are things that cannot be known today. No documents dealing with either of these events have ever been found. The village’s earliest times are shrouded in darkness. Nevertheless, Dörrebach likely has the Romans to thank for its beginnings. Specific details are missing, but the rather well established traditional story about two Roman roads joining each other here (one from Mainz-Bingen and the other from Kreuznach, which after the junction led by way of the Thiergarten and Argenthal to Neumagen on the Moselle) suggests that this area before the Soonwald was inhabited quite early on. From the Stone Age came archaeological finds of stone axes, flint blades, arrowheads, and awls made of bone. From the Bronze Age came a dagger and a lance, which were unearthed at the “Wolf’sch” (that is, pertaining to the former feudal lords, named Wolf von Sponheim) stone quarries. In the vicinity of the Neupfalz Chief Forestry Office, armbands, bronze fibulae and urns for keeping ash were discovered in a barrow. From Hallstatt times, a human dwelling with two rooms was found in the Hunsfelsen (cliffs). In one of these, a human skeleton was found, along with grave goods. In the Naheland-Kalender 1954, Gisela Sommer wrote (unfortunately without mentioning her source for the 433 date):

The little village of Dörrebach is one of the oldest Roman settlements; the churchtower up to its roof comes from as far back as Roman times, and before the Romans left the village in the year 433, they had already established in this tower a Christian worship site. Very numerous, of course, have been the finds from Roman times. In Dörrebach, a Roman grave lamp, a ring with an inscription and many coins have been brought to light. On the way from Dörrebach to Seibersbach, wall remnants can be found that supposedly come from a Roman estate.

The so-called Hinkelstein – a regional word for “menhir” (the article Hinkelstein culture includes an explanation of the word’s etymology) – found near the farmstead Birkenhof, is held to be an impressive witness to Dörrebach’s eventful past. These menhirs are known in the German vernacular as Hünensteine. Since the Roman road ran up through the Guldenbach valley, the castrum on the Schlossberg would have had particular importance as a place where watch was kept. The Roman road led from Dörrebach by way of the so-called Atzweiler Abbey to Simmern and Trier. Besides finds of milestones and graves, which can be taken as the definite basis for inferring the road’s alignment, there are also literary sources. It is also believed that rural cadastral names containing the German word for “wall”, “Mauer” (of which there are three) have some historical link to Roman building remnants found in some parts of Dörrebach’s municipal area.

=== Middle Ages ===
Dörrebach and Seibersbach along with a few estates formed a unit and belonged in the Middle Ages to the Palatinate. Language and customs may well have been as in other parts of this land. It is known from records that from the mid to late 15th century the Electors of Mainz had enfeoffed the Lords of Sponheim, whose landholds lay in the Upper Rhine districts, with it. Dörrebach’s size in the time between 1580 and 1600 was supposedly 32 houses with 144 inhabitants. The inhabitants’ relationship with their lords, the Wolfe von Sponheim, was, as elsewhere, one of serfdom. The serfs had to work for a prescribed time for their lords, pay them great tithes (and smaller tithes to the clergy) and perform other unpaid work. Thus, they had to, for instance, perform transport and delivery services for as far as three (local) miles and also bring the lords loads of wood and other things. The comital House of Sponheim built in Dörrebach the so-called Schloss (known until it was torn down in 1940/1941 as the schoolhouse), where either the counts themselves or their administrators lived.

=== Modern times ===
On 5 May 1672, at the Schloss, sometime between 0900 and 1000, at the age of 61 years, 5 weeks and 2 days, the Imperial baron, highborn lord, Johann Werner Wolf von Sponheim, died. As was customary for the nobility, he was buried in the quire at the Dörrebach church. The yard at the Schloss (still called the Schlosshof today) was surrounded with commercial buildings, of which the so-called tithe barns still stand today, although they have now been converted into dwellings. Before the house at this time was a well. In February 1702, Dörrebach passed by way of sale to the Baron, later Count, of Ingelheim, Franz Adolf Dietrich, Kammergericht President in Wetzlar. The sale price was 63,000 Rhenish guilders. The inhabitants’ relationship with their lords remained as before. The Ingelheim comital office from which Dörrebach was administered was to be found in Schweppenhausen. The Dörrebach area suffered greatly in King Louis XIV’s wars of conquest. French troops occupied the land and French administration was introduced. Under the terms of the 1697 Treaty of Ryswick, however, Louis XIV was obliged to cede Electoral Palatinate and some neighbouring territories back to the Empire.

==== Recent times ====
===== French Revolution and 19th century =====
In the late 18th century, the French Revolution broke out, and the leaders of the new republic sent their Jacobin armies to the long-coveted Rhine, although they did not come into possession of the lands on the Rhine’s left bank until the 1801 Treaty of Lunéville. The Ingelheim lordship was thus swept away. The country was newly subdivided administratively and French administration was introduced once again. The French Revolutionary Calendar was introduced, too, as were French Revolutionary innovations, which swept aside all that was remembered from earlier times. Dörrebach found itself at this time in the Mairie (“Mayoralty”) of Stromberg, the Arrondissement of Simmern and the Department of Rhin-et-Moselle. Serfdom came to an end, as did likewise compulsory labour for the state. Under the French conqueror’s flag, local people had to take up arms against foreigners and Germans alike. After the Napoleonic Wars, the region passed back to German control under the terms of the Congress of Vienna. The Counts of Ingelheim, though, who had sold their holdings at fire sale prices at the onset of the French advance in the 1790s found themselves in a similar position to the one in which so many smaller and clerical lords had found themselves earlier in the wake of the 1803 Reichsdeputationshauptschluss: they lost their lands and thereby also the lordship over Dörrebach, which passed to the Kingdom of Prussia, within which it was grouped into the new Rhine Province. Once this had been administratively subdivided, Dörrebach found itself in the Regierungsbezirk of Koblenz and the Kreuznach district. Since this time, Dörrebach has been a self-administering municipality. In 1833, an Evangelical school was set up in a rented room in a house, so that the village’s Evangelical schoolchildren would not have to go all the way to Seibersbach to go to school. The first schoolteacher there was a student named Götz. By 1873, however, this school was gone, as indeed was the whole building in which the schoolroom had been, with a carpentry shop there instead. As far back as 1837, Dörrebach’s first watermain was built, drawing water from the Hemgen-Born, a spring in the Royal Forest and carrying it through cast-iron pipes to the village. Its total length was 9,470 Prussian feet, or 2 972.16 m (a Prussian foot was slightly longer than its English counterpart, measuring 31.385 cm). The then mayor of Dörrebach, named Dheil, had laid out the great need for such a thing in a statement on 14 February of that year. Not only was plentiful drinking water needed for people (the local wells sometimes would not yield up enough water in the summertime), but water was also needed for livestock in this agrarian village, and the mayor complained in his statement that villagers were having to fetch water from “quite a small brook” that flowed by some “three thousand paces” (thus roughly 3 km) from the village. Water for cooking also had to be drawn here. Dheil believed that boring more wells was not the solution to this problem, and added that the need was greatest when fire broke out. On 12 March 1876, a frightful windstorm struck Dörrebach and wrought widespread devastation, tearing roofs off and snapping or uprooting countless trees. On 17 November 1881, the local press reported on a murder trial in which the accused and the victims were people from Dörrebach, which was also the scene of the crimes. A blacksmith named Philipp Orben, born on 1 April 1854 at Wallhausen and living in Dörrebach, was charged with murdering his mother-in-law, the widow Gerhard née Altmeyer, and his 14-year-old sister-in-law, Franziska Gerhard, with malice aforethought by poisoning them both with arsenic. The accused had married the late Mr. and Mrs. Gerhard’s eldest daughter on 24 May 1879 and had come to live with them. Mr. Gerhard was still alive at that time, but that lasted less than a year when Orben’s father-in-law suddenly died on 11 April 1880, and this after many months of upset and misery in the household, which had apparently begun with Orben’s arrival. On 26 December the same year, Mrs. Gerhard likewise suddenly died, leaving all her daughters living with Orben. Then, on 29 March 1881, Franziska Gerhard suddenly died, but this time suspicions of poisoning led to Mr. and Mrs. Gerhard’s and Franziska’s bodies being exhumed and autopsied. Mr. Gerhard’s body was too badly decayed for any meaningful conclusions to be drawn, but 50 mg of arsenic was found in Mrs. Gerhard’s stomach, as was an even greater amount in Franziska’s. Philipp Orben had found ways to procure arsenic from the apothecary repeatedly, but he denied everything, and his behaviour in court was described as impudent. The jury found him guilty, and the prosecutor asked the court to impose the death penalty and to strip Orben of his civil rights.

===== 20th century =====
A catastrophic fire on 6 August 1911 made it clear to municipal council that Dörrebach needed a fire brigade. The proposal to establish such a thing found great support among the villagers and the authorities alike. Council put forth 500 marks towards the founding of a volunteer fire brigade and the district fire authority in Bad Kreuznach gave its approval to the project on 29 July 1912. On 9 February 1913, Philipp Klein, the local forester, was chosen to be the village’s first fire chief. Not long thereafter, of course, the First World War broke out and many of the men had to go away to fight. Philipp Klein never came back. He fell in Russia on 18 July 1915. One of his colleagues from the fire brigade leadership, Hermann Göller, also fell in the Great War on 18 September 1914.

===== First World War =====
The leadup to the First World War was characterized by a tense atmosphere as everyone in Dörrebach awaited news of a solution to Europe’s quickly deteriorating political situation. Few people wanted to believe that a war would break out, and indeed when some workers came back from town on 31 July 1914 bringing with them news of Germany’s mobilization, few people would believe them (the war had in fact broken out three days earlier). The official word came from policeman Böhmer on 1 August. The whole village was woken up by the toll of the village bell at about midnight. No sooner had Böhmer read out the Mobilization Order than pandemonium broke out in Dörrebach’s streets, despite the late hour. A crowd gathered at reeve Bernhard May’s home in the hope of finding out more news while weeping was heard from the village’s women and children. The disquiet lasted all night. The next day, Philipp Dhein’s and Eva Gerhardt’s general stores were both beset by housewives seeking to buy whatever they could in the way of food, reasoning that it would soon become scarce. Flour and salt were items of particular interest. This hoarding unfortunately characterized the whole war on the home front. The sellers, for their part, raised prices and reaped greater profits. There also arose a degree of paranoia about spies in the villagers’ midst. Needless to say, any foreigner was suspect. Two young lads from the village nearly got themselves shot when on the way back from Seibersbach, where they had gone to buy bread, they chose to rest awhile in a roadside ditch next to a rye field. Somebody spotted them there and took them for spies. The village was soon on alert and the local forester, armed with the guns that he thought he would need, arrived on the scene. The lads were recognized in time, though, before there was any shooting.

===== Weimar times, the Third Reich and the Second World War =====
The year 1921 was a time of bad harvests in Dörrebach. The hay harvest was disappointing, and so was the yield from the village’s summer crops, for it had been a hot, dry summer. Most keenly felt, though, was the poor potato harvest. Few potato growers even reaped enough for their own needs. The solution was to buy a consignment of potatoes from Stettin in Pomerania (then still in Germany, now Szczecin in Poland), which Robert Molzahn, a wholesale dealer in produce and wood, duly and thoughtfully shipped by rail to Stromberg for the price of 215 ℳ. The load amounted to 300 Zentner (German hundredweight, thus 15 000 kg). Molzahn confirmed the shipping of the 15-tonne load by letter on 27 April 1922 and furthermore promised more potatoes if they were wanted, remarking that they were plentiful in Pomerania. On 9 November 1935, the foundation stone was laid for Dörrebach’s new National Socialist Volkshaus (“People’s House”, meaning in this case a municipal hall). The date for the occasion was chosen to honour the 16 Nazi “heroes” who had fallen in the Beer Hall Putsch twelve years to the day earlier. In 1945, the last Wehrmacht troops left the immediate area, retreating towards the Rhine on 16 March. Two days later came American tank troops from the Thiergarten. A Mr. Werkhäuser, who had evacuated from Bad Kreuznach to Dörrebach, approached the Americans with a white flag, and for this the Americans appointed him “Lord Major”. They then seized the schoolhouse, the schoolyard and the houses on the Kipp and in the Schlag (local rural localities), evacuating them to billet their men. Later, several properties in the lower village were seized and evacuated as well. Roadblocks were set up, and people were only allowed to leave the village for two hours each day. After a fortnight, the Americans pulled out of Dörrebach and moved on, taking along with them various persons from the local Nazi Party organization who had had leadership roles in the soon-to-be-bygone Third Reich (which indeed ceased to exist about five and a half weeks later, after Adolf Hitler killed himself and his appointed successor Karl Dönitz surrendered to the Allies) and later handed them over to the French occupational authorities who held them in a camp. The French also appointed Heinrich Göller as the provisional mayor. Eighteen men from Dörrebach fell in the First World War, while 22 fell and 14 went missing in the Second World War.

=== Schinderhannes ===
The legendary German outlaw, Schinderhannes (true name: Johannes Bückler; ~1778–1803), found himself at various times within Dörrebach’s limits, and the villagers long remembered him, even after he was beheaded by guillotine in 1803, after finally being caught. A clergyman named Daniel reports a story related to Schinderhannes:

In the earliest years (1871/1872) of my time as pastor, one day somebody found a man at the lavatory, dead. The man was avoided by people and it has been told me by old, respectable citizens that this man’s mother had been Schinderhannes’s daughter, and the circumstances of his death were linked with his origins.

A farmer wanted to buy a cow in Rheinböllen. He could, however, not buy what he wanted, and so on the way back home he still had his 34 Thaler in his pocket. When Schinderhannes came and stood before him on the road, full of fear, the farmer described his intention honestly, and its failure. He had reckoned that as a result, he would now have to part with his hard-earned money. Schinderhannes, though, believed his explanation, left his money alone and advised him not to look back on the rest of his trip and not to stop. So that his money would not be taken by accomplices on the way, Schinderhannes revealed to him the day’s password: Eckstein Ass ist Trumpf (“Cornerstone ace is trump”). On the rest of the journey, the farmer had several men call him, whereupon each time he called out the password loudly, and in the end he arrived home safely with his money.

=== Municipality’s name ===
The name’s origin has not been established with absolute certainty. It supposedly derives from the brook’s name, which in its lower reaches is ausgedörrt (“dried up”, see Geology above), the implication here being that the word element —dörr— is somehow linked to the name “Dörrebach” (the —bach ending means “brook”). Over the ages, though, the name has changed quite often. A document that names part of what is now Dörrebach, namely the Gollenfels, comes from 1156. It was then that Stromberg, along with its appurtenances, among which was the Gollenfels, passed to Conrad von Hohenstaufen, Count Palatine of the Rhine. On his deathbed in 1195, he bequeathed his Stromberg holdings to his daughter Agnes and her husband Heinrich von Braunschweig, his successor. The village’s name has taken the following forms over time: Durrenbach (1281), Dornbach (1425), Dorrenbach (about 1450), Durrenbach (1460, 1516 and about 1570), Dorrnbach (1604), Dornbach (1605), Dörbach, Dörnbach (1656), Dörrenbach (1670), Dörren- und Seiffersbach (1676), Dörr- und Seibersbach (1717). Over the rest of the 18th century, documents use the modern form, Dörrebach, time and again, thus suggesting that the village had finally settled on the form of the name.

=== Vanished villages ===
The unusual alignment of Dörrebach’s municipal limit in the area of the Lehnmühle (mill) bolsters the likelihood that there was once a hamlet there named Hedisweiler (Hidewilre), which sometime about the 16th century passed to Schöneberg.

=== Population development ===
Dörrebach’s population development since Napoleonic times is shown in the table below. The figures for the years from 1871 to 1987 are drawn from census data:

Year	Inhabitants
1815	598
1835	792
1871	715
1905	651
1939	575

Year	Inhabitants
1950	700
1961	671
1970	750
1987	709
2005	723

== Religion ==
As at 31 August 2013, there are 688 full-time residents in Dörrebach, and of those, 154 are Evangelical (22.384%), 370 are Catholic (53.779%), 3 are Greek Orthodox (0.436%), 10 (1.453%) belong to other religious groups and 151 (21.948%) either have no religion or will not reveal their religious affiliation.

== Politics ==
=== Municipal council ===
The council is made up of 12 council members, who were elected by proportional representation at the municipal election held on 7 June 2009, and the honorary mayor as chairwoman. The municipal election held on 7 June 2009 yielded the following results:

Group	Share (%)	+/–	Seats	+/–
CDU	57.2	+7.5	7	+2
FWG Dörrebach	42.8	+42.8	5	+5

The FWG Dörrebach replaced other free voters’ groups that stood in the 2004 municipal election.

=== Mayor ===
Dörrebach’s mayor is Harald Scholl.

=== Coat of arms ===
The municipality’s arms might be described thus: Vert a bend wavy argent abased, in sinister chief a cross Latin countercompony gules and Or.

The escutcheon takes the prescribed simple or formal shape. The field tincture is vert (green), because Dörrebach lies at the edge of the Soonwald (forest) and the yield from both the forest and the fields was always of great importance to the villagers. The village’s name is without a doubt derived from the brook that flows through the southern part of the municipality, itself having always been called the Dörrebach, because to a great extent it dries up (see Geology and Municipality’s name above) at Dörrebach, and in its lower reaches, down to where it empties into the Guldenbach, it only carries water when there is heavy rainfall. In reference to the name is the wavy bend (slanted stripe), which is supposed to represent the Dörrebach’s course. The Latin cross is the oldest municipal symbol known, chiselled into not only very old borderstones, but into ones newly set in 1714 in the same form as a reference to Dörrebach. According to old stories that have been handed down, the greatest importance was ascribed to the municipal boundaries because of grazing and hunting rights. The parish belonged from 1420 to 1702 to the Counts of Sponheim, and this may well explain the chequered pattern (“countercompony”, meaning with two rows of squares of alternating tinctures) borne on this cross.

== Culture and sightseeing ==
=== Buildings ===
The following are listed buildings or sites in Rhineland-Palatinate’s Directory of Cultural Monuments:

- Evangelical church, Seibersbacher Straße – Gothic Revival quarrystone building, 1900
- Assumption of Mary Catholic Church (Kirche Mariä Himmelfahrt), Kirchstraße – Baroque aisleless church, 1754, Romanesque quire tower, mid 13th century, sacristy addition, marked 1515
- Kirchstraße 4 – Catholic rectory; Late Classicist plastered building, 1858, barn
- Schloßstraße 17 – former Volkshaus (roughly “union hall”); one- to two-floor group of buildings, mid 1930s
- Schloßstraße 20 – former tithe barn; Baroque building with half-hip roof, quarrystone, 18th century, converted in the earlier half of the 19th century into something similar to an Einfirsthaus (traditional house with single roof ridge) and given a Classicist makeover
- Schulstraße 20 – school; Heimatstil, about 1838/1839
- Stromberger Straße 37 – timber-frame house, Baroque building with half-hip roof, partly timber-frame, marked 1746
- Castle Gollenfels, Von-Gauvain-Straße – mentioned in 1156, destroyed in 1614, beginning in 1619 reconstruction of the dwelling wing with a stairway tower amid incorporation of a dwelling tower from the 13th or 14th century; monument to I. L. Gauvin, after 1791, monumental stone, marked 1833
- Denkmalzone Jüdischer Friedhof, in the forest on the Dörrebach, near the Lehnmühle (mill) – area with 20 gravestones, latter half of the 19th century and early 20th century
- Lime kilns, on Landesstraße 242 – two lime kilns, quarrystone, 19th century
- Michaelskapelle (Saint Michael’s Chapel), at the Weinbergerhof – plastered building, essentially Baroque, 18th century

=== Regular events ===
The kermis (church consecration festival), called "Kerb", is held either on the Feast of the Assumption of Mary (15 August) or, if that falls in midweek, on the following Sunday and Monday.

=== Clubs ===
The following clubs are active in Dörrebach:

- Blaskapelle 1953 Dörrebach e.V. — (126 Mitglieder / 45 Aktive / Stand 14.01.2005)
- Bücherei Dörrebach — library
- Evangelische Frauenhilfe — Evangelical women’s aid
- FC Bayern - Fanclub "Soonwaldbullen 93" — FC Bayern Munich fan club
- Freunde der Feuerwehr Dörrebach e.V. — “Friends of the Dörrebach fire brigade” (128 members as of June 2008)
- Katholische Frauengemeinschaft — Catholic women’s association (roughly 70 members)
- Kindergarten- und Jugendförderverein Dörrebach e.V. — kindergarten and youth promotional association
- Kirchenchor Cäcilia — church choir (roughly 25 singers)
- Seniorenclub Dörrebach — seniors’ club
- Soonwaldwanderer Dörrebach e.V. — hiking club (roughly 65 members as of March 2008)
- SSV 1920 Dörrebach e.V. — sport and swimming club

== Economy and infrastructure ==
=== Inns ===
Dörrebach has two of these: the “Taverna Meteora”, and outside the village (between Stromberg and Dörrebach) the “Weinbergerhof”.

=== Transport ===
Among other transport links, Dörrebach can be reached by way of the nearest Autobahn interchanges in Stromberg and Rheinböllen, both on the A 61.

== Famous people ==
- Jacob Vollrath (b. September 19, 1824; d. May 15, 1898), industrialist in Sheboygan, Wisconsin, United States

=== Sons and daughters of the town ===
- Hermann Hill (b. 29 October 1951), German jurist, college teacher and politician
- Klaus-Peter Hildenbrand (b. 11 September 1952), former German long-distance runner
