= Hergenfeld =

- Municipality
- Coat of arms

- Location of Hergenfeld within Bad Kreuznach district
- Interactive map of Hergenfeld
- Location within Germany Location within Rhineland-Palatinate
- Coordinates: 49°54′14″N 7°45′45″E
- Country: Germany
- State: Rhineland-Palatinate
- District: Bad Kreuznach
- Municipal assoc.: Rüdesheim

Government
  - Mayor (2019–24): Martin Theis

Area
  - Total: 5.90 km^{2} (2.28 sq mi)
- Elevation: 317 m (1,040 ft)

Population (2025-12-31)
  - Total: 494
  - Density: 83.7/km^{2} (217/sq mi)
- Time zone: UTC+01:00 (CET)
  - Summer (DST): UTC+02:00 (CEST)
- Postal codes: 55452
- Dialling codes: 06706
- Vehicle registration: KH
- Website: www.hergenfeld.de

Hergenfeld is an Ortsgemeinde – a municipality belonging to a Verbandsgemeinde, a kind of collective municipality – in the Bad Kreuznach district in Rhineland-Palatinate, Germany. It belongs to the Verbandsgemeinde of Rüdesheim, whose seat is in the municipality of Rüdesheim an der Nahe. Hergenfeld is a winegrowing village.

== Geography ==
=== Location ===
Hergenfeld lies at the foot of the Soonwald between the Naheland – the land lining each side of the Nahe – and the Hunsrück. The village is surrounded not only by cropfields and meadows, but also by woods and vineyards. Hergenfeld lies roughly 11 km northwest of the district seat of Bad Kreuznach.

=== Neighbouring municipalities ===
Clockwise from the north, Hergenfeld’s neighbours are the municipalities of Schöneberg, Windesheim, Wallhausen and Spabrücken, all of which likewise lie within the Bad Kreuznach district.

=== Constituent communities ===
Also belonging to Hergenfeld is the outlying homestead of Georgshof.

== History ==
Since the Lower Nahe was ice-free and lay in the middle tundra zone during the last ice age, there were good living conditions in the Hergenfeld area for the Old Stone Age’s hunter-gatherers. Nature offered them much in the way of food, from game to berries and other edible wild fruits. Bearing witness to settlers in this area in the “Newer Old Stone Age” (75,000 to 10,000 BC) are archaeological finds of rough-hewn quartzite tools on the Lindengrund near Heddesheim. Various documentation of the cultural succession through the Bronze Age and the Iron Age hold proof of a growing tendency to settle. Beginning about 500 BC, the Celts were the people who had settled in the Nahe valley and its branches. They lived together in orderly communities. Early grave complexes from these times in the municipal areas between Wallhausen and Windesheim point to Celtic settlement in the Hergenfeld area. There have also been finds from the time after the Bronze Age from about 600 to 200 BC near Wallhausen. In the last few centuries of the pre-Christian era, the Celts were displaced by Germanic people, and then when the Romans came in the 1st century BC, they found a Celtic-Germanic population. The Hergenfeld area, along with most of the land in this part of Germany, was then incorporated into the Roman Empire. For 300 years, Roman influence characterized the local culture. Later, when the Romans were beaten by the Alemanni, who then thrust northwards, these Germanic newcomers found themselves at odds with the Franks, who had come up from the Lower Rhine and had already conquered the Rhenish lands. At the Battle of Tolbiac in AD 496, the Alemanni were beaten and thereby forced to cede the northern part of their domain, including the Naheland where Hergenfeld now lies, to the victors, the Franks, another Germanic people. Thus, King Clovis I of the Franks, who, true to the vow that he had made in the battle, had himself baptized, became the local ruler. Clovis’s successors were bishops and princes who divided the land among themselves. Otto the Great thus made a donation to Saint Alban’s Abbey at Mainz. On 21 July 963, the following was recorded:

“The royal estate of Hergiesfeld in the county of Count Emicho in the Nahegau passes by donation to Saint Alban’s Abbey of Mainz.”

The document is signed by Otto the Great’s son, King Otto II. Known from this document is the village’s original name, which over the ages underwent so many changes. Also known from this document is that the one-thousandth-anniversary celebration held in Hergenfeld in 1969 was rather overdue. The sovereignty held by the Archbishop of Mainz was founded on the lordly power bestowed upon Archbishop Willigis in 983 by Emperor Otto II. The Archbishops’ holdings in the Nahegau were strewn about in several groupings. Belonging to one of these groups was each of Gau-Algesheim and Bingen am Rhein, to which belonged the Binger Wald (forest) and the fiefs of Dörrenbach, Schöneberg vor dem Wald and the royal estate of Hergiesfeld. Around the royal estate arose a settlement, which was held by a knightly family from Schönenberg who bore three silver crosses on a black shield as a coat of arms, an heraldic device still seen in Hergenfeld’s civic arms today (the other is the Wheel of Mainz). The lordship was later held by the Family von Schöneburg bei Oberwesel. After Count Emanuel Maximilian Wilhelm von Schömburg’s death, the fief passed back to the overlord, the Electorate of Mainz, whereupon Prince-Bishop-Elector Anselm Franz enfeoffed his family with it, for which privilege he was paid 7,000 Rhenish guilders. How far back Christian life goes in Hergenfeld is unknown. According to the documents that are available today, the chapel that stands now was built in 1863. The baptismal font comes from the 17th century, however. The eight-sided chalice-shaped font with flat stripe ornamentation, rosettes and leafy patterns rests on the four-sided foot with seashell ornamentation. The figurine of the Mother of God with Child comes from the 18th century. The most valuable piece from the Hergenfeld chapel, the Late Gothic predella, is now to be found at the Diocesan Museum in Trier. It is a painted tablet with portraits of Christ and the Twelve Apostles from about 1500, a Middle Rhine work akin to the 1506 altar at the Liebfrauenkirche (Church of Our Lady) at Oberwesel. The organ at the church was built by the first organ builder of a family of organ builders, Stumm.

=== Population development ===
Hergenfeld’s population development since Napoleonic times is shown in the table below. The figures for the years from 1871 to 1987 are drawn from census data:

Year	Inhabitants
1815	251
1835	381
1871	354
1905	365
1939	343

Year	Inhabitants
1950	370
1961	325
1970	337
1987	409
2005	499

== Religion ==
As at 30 September 2013, there are 502 full-time residents in Hergenfeld, and of those, 79 are Evangelical (15.737%), 357 are Catholic (71.116%), 3 (0.598%) belong to other religious groups and 63 (12.55%) either have no religion or will not reveal their religious affiliation.

== Politics ==
=== Municipal council ===
The council is made up of 12 council members, who were elected by majority vote at the municipal election held on 7 June 2009, and the honorary mayor as chairman.

=== Mayor ===
Hergenfeld’s mayor is Martin Theis, and his deputies are Edel Lang and Peter Heckmann.

=== Coat of arms ===
The municipality’s arms might be described thus: Per fess abased sable three crosses pattée argent and gules a wheel spoked of six of the second.

=== Town partnerships ===
Hergenfeld fosters partnerships with the following places:

- (Germany) Königsmoos, Neuburg-Schrobenhausen, Bavaria since 3 October 2010

Königsmoos’s outlying centre of Klingsmoos was named after Electoral forest chamber director Johann Peter Kling, who was born in Hergenfeld and who was significantly involved in cultivating the Old Bavarian Donaumoos.

== Culture and sightseeing ==
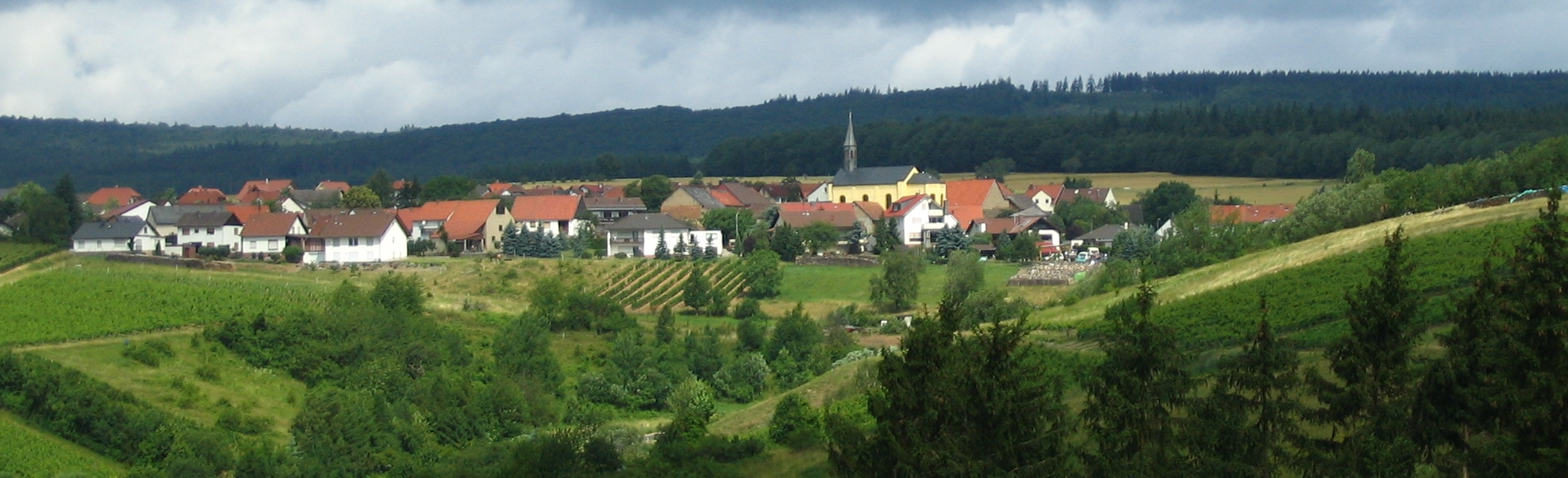
View of the village from the south

=== Buildings ===
The following are listed buildings or sites in Rhineland-Palatinate’s Directory of Cultural Monuments:

- Saint Martin’s Catholic Church (Kirche St. Martin), Kirchstraße 7 – Romanesquified aisleless church, 1863; at the church two Baroque grave crosses, 1724 and 1733; Late Baroque sandstone Crucifix, marked 1762
- Kirchstraße 9 – hook-shaped estate; timber-frame house, marked 1882, essentially possibly from the earlier half of the 19th century, barn and stable from the late 19th or early 20th century
- Kirchstraße 26 – complex with single roof ridge, house with single roof ridge, timber-frame, earlier half of the 19th century
- Plague cross, on Kreisstraße 29 – possibly from 1620, restored in 1843

=== Clubs ===
Currently active in Hergenfeld are the following clubs:

- Brieftaubenclub 97 — homing pigeon club
- Dorfladen Hergenfeld w.V. — village shop (legally a “commercial club”)
- Eltern-Kind-Gruppe — parent-child group
- Frauengemeinschaft — women’s association
- Freiwillige Feuerwehr — volunteer fire brigade
- Freunde der Feuerwehr Hergenfeld e.V. — friends of the fire brigade
- Kirchenchor Cäcilia — church choir
- Kuckuckstheater e.V. — “Cuckoo Theatre”
- Orchesterverein “Harmonie” 1929 Hergenfeld e.V. — orchestra club
- Pfälzer Waldverein — hiking club
- Seniorenkreis — seniors’ circle
- Tanzgruppe Satifasction — dance group
- Turn- und Sportverein e.V. — gymnastic and sport club

=== Wines ===
Hergenfeld is known for its winegrowing, and its fruity wines bear the marks of the slaty soil of the Hergenfelder Berg (the Hunsrück itself is part of a vast slate formation called the Rhenish Massif).

== Economy and infrastructure ==
=== Transport ===
Hergenfeld lies far away from most main highways in the region. Running through the village is Kreisstraße 45. The nearest Autobahn interchange is at Waldlaubersheim on the A 61 (Koblenz–Ludwigshafen). Serving Bad Kreuznach is a railway station on the Nahe Valley Railway (Bingen–Saarbrücken).

== Famous people ==
=== Sons and daughters of the town ===
==== Johann Peter Kling ====
Johann Peter Kling was born on 8 March 1749 to the schoolteacher Konrad Kling in Hergenfeld, and on 1 April he was baptized in neighbouring Schöneberg in the Catholic faith, with Johann Schlawek and the Schultheiß Johann Peter Knor both standing godfather. His parents may have soon thereafter moved to southern Electoral Palatinate where they saw to their son’s higher learning in Speyer, Mannheim and Wetzlar. Since he became a mathematics professor at the Electoral Pagerie in 1774 and joined the Electoral Palatinate economic administration in 1780 as a Hofkammerrat (roughly “Electoral Exchequer Councillor”), it can be safely assumed that he studied mathematics and cameralism. As forest commissary, he took over the leadership of the newly founded court forest chamber in 1780, and at about that same time, he became a member of the Mannheim Academy of Sciences. He was entrusted by Prince-Elector Karl Theodor with the direction of all Electoral-Palatine forestry matters, and thus between 1783 and 1795 rose to be Electoral Palatinate’s top forestry professional, who as such not only introduced modern forestry into all state forests through drainage, local mapping, forestation and progressive forest management ordinances, but also rendered outstanding services to the draining of the Landstuhler Bruch in the Western Palatinate. Even in the midst of all this work, Kling came back to the Soonwald for a time in 1786. In August 1795, Prince-Elector Karl Theodor, who had since also become Prince-Elector of Bavaria, called Kling to Munich to become the director of the forest chamber there. About 1800, he settled in Probfeld in the Old Bavarian Donaumoos, where on 11 December 1808, at the age of 59, he died of nervous fever (as it was then known). On 2 December 1816, his remains were exhumed and moved to a new grave at the then newly laid-out graveyard in Karlskron, where his wife, who died in 1823, was later also buried. The grave, however, has not been preserved.
