= Argenschwang =

- Municipality
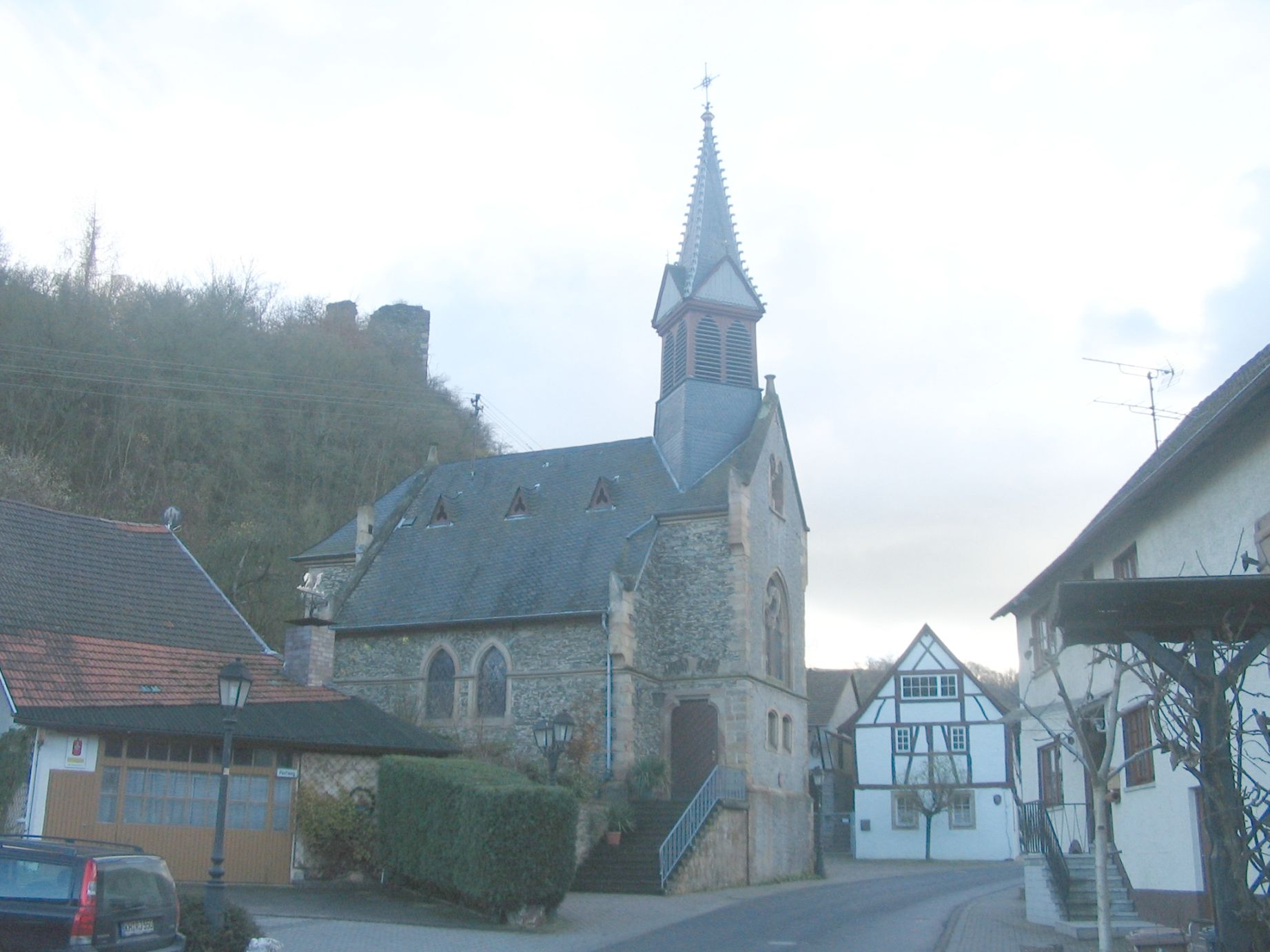

- Coat of arms

- Location of Argenschwang within Bad Kreuznach district
- Interactive map of Argenschwang
- Location within Germany Location within Rhineland-Palatinate
- Coordinates: 49°52′51″N 7°41′57″E
- Country: Germany
- State: Rhineland-Palatinate
- District: Bad Kreuznach
- Municipal assoc.: Rüdesheim

Government
  - Mayor (2019–24): Petra Ender

Area
  - Total: 4.25 km^{2} (1.64 sq mi)
- Elevation: 295 m (968 ft)

Population (2025-12-31)
  - Total: 325
  - Density: 76.5/km^{2} (198/sq mi)
- Time zone: UTC+01:00 (CET)
  - Summer (DST): UTC+02:00 (CEST)
- Postal codes: 55595
- Dialling codes: 06707
- Vehicle registration: KH
- Website: www.argenschwang.de

Argenschwang is an Ortsgemeinde – a municipality belonging to a Verbandsgemeinde, a kind of collective municipality – in the Bad Kreuznach district in Rhineland-Palatinate, Germany. It belongs to the Verbandsgemeinde of Rüdesheim, whose seat is in the municipality of Rüdesheim an der Nahe.

== Geography ==
=== Location ===
Argenschwang lies in the southern Hunsrück, between the Soonwald and the Gauchswald, at the 361 m-high Geisberg.

=== Neighbouring municipalities ===
Argenschwang borders in the north on the municipality of Spabrücken, in the northeast on the municipality of Dalberg, in the east on the municipalities of Wallhausen and Braunweiler, in the south on the municipality of Sponheim, in the west on the municipalities of Allenfeld and Spall and in the northwest on the municipality of Münchwald.

=== Constituent communities ===
Also belonging to Argenschwang are the outlying homesteads of Webersmühle and Wiesenhof.

== History ==
In 1127, Argenschwang had its first documentary mention under its former name, Hausen, which was customary up until the 16th century. In this document, Argenschwang was mentioned as an endowment estate for Sponheim Abbey. According to a record written by Johannes Trithemius, Abbot Baldemar von Sponheim acquired the village of Hausen (Argenschwang) in 1195 from the local lords, the Counts of Sponheim, for 2,000 pounds in Heller. In 1332, Count Johann of Sponheim pledged the castle along with the dale below (and hence the village as well) to the Knights of Ariswanke. The knights were themselves vassals of the Counts of Sponheim.

=== Municipality’s name ===
The name Argenschwang is made up of the Old High German root word wang, meaning “field”, “meadow” or “grazing land” (this is also seen in the name Feuchtwangen), and another Old High German word arin, which might be taken either to mean “eagle” or to be a short form of a man's name, perhaps Arinbald or Arinfried. It could therefore be that the village of Argenschwang arose as a small grazing farm on Arin's meadows.

=== Jewish history ===
Until about 1938 or 1940, during the time of the Third Reich, there was a Jewish community in Argenschwang. It arose in the mid 18th century, although there might have been a few Jews living in the village as early as the 16th and 17th centuries. In 1858, 66 of Argenschwang's inhabitants were Jewish, accounting for 14% of the population. In 1895, there were 48 Jews living in Argenschwang (11%). Also belonging to Argenschwang's Jewish community were Jewish inhabitants in Spabrücken and Spall. It is believed, though, that the Jews living in Spabrücken had in the 19th century at first belonged to the small Jewish community in Schöneberg. In the way of institutions, there were a synagogue (see Former synagogue below), a Jewish school, a mikveh and a graveyard (see Jewish graveyard below). To provide for the community's religious needs, a schoolteacher was hired for a time, who also busied himself as the hazzan and the shochet. In the First World War, four men from Argenschwang's Jewish community fell in battle (Max Salomon, Moritz Schwarz, Leopold Gamiel and Heinrich Wolf). Their names now appear on the memorial stone for the fallen of both world wars across the street from the former synagogue. About 1924, when the community still consisted of 30 persons in eight families (7.8% of some 450 inhabitants), the head of the community was Jakob Gamiel. Twelve persons living in Spabrücken then also counted themselves as members of the community, and also by this time, the 18 Jews living in Wallhausen had been grouped together with the Argenschwang community. In 1932, the head of the community was Jakob Gamiel III. In the 1931/1932 school year, six Jewish children received religious instruction. In 1933, the year when Adolf Hitler and the Nazis seized power, there were still 29 Jews living in Argenschwang (out of 385 inhabitants all together). In the years that followed, though, some of the Jews emigrated in the face of the boycotting of their businesses, the progressive stripping of their rights and repression, all brought about by the Nazis. On Kristallnacht (9–10 November 1938), Leopold Wolf's and Abraham Schwarz's houses over in Spabrücken were invaded and thoroughly demolished by Brownshirt thugs. According to Yad Vashem's lists and information from the work Gedenkbuch - Opfer der Verfolgung der Juden unter der nationalsozialistischen Gewaltherrschaft in Deutschland 1933-1945 ("Memorial Book – Victims of the Persecution of Jews under the National Socialist Tyranny in Germany 1933-1945"), the following members of Argenschwang's Jewish community fell victim to the Holocaust (along with their birth years):

- Helene Gärtner née Garnich (1888)
- Egon Edmond Gamiel (1834)
- Ernst Gamiel (1904)
- Mathilde Gamiel (1881)
- Klara Geisel née Gamiel (1878)
- Auguste Herrmann née Hirsch (1878)
- Arnold Hirsch (1927)
- Ida Hirsch née Harf (1900)
- Max Hirsch (1898)
- Elisa Kahn née Gamiel (1891)
- Blondine Levy née Salomon (1885)
- Karoline Mann née Salomon (1876)
- Emanuel Mayer (1883)
- Johanna Mayer née Gamiel (1887)
- Emil Salomon (1885)
- Moritz Salomon (1887)
- Johanette Wolf née Schwarz (1877)
- Leopold Wolf (1865)

=== Population development ===
The table shows Argenschwang's population development. The figures in the table from 1871 to 1987 are based on censuses:

| Year | Inhabitants |
|---|---|
| 1815 | 326 |
| 1835 | 386 |
| 1871 | 442 |
| 1905 | 399 |
| 1939 | 532 |

| Year | Inhabitants |
|---|---|
| 1950 | 352 |
| 1961 | 341 |
| 1970 | 350 |
| 1987 | 333 |
| 2005 | 379 |

== Religion ==
As at 31 August 2013, there are 345 full-time residents in Argenschwang, and of those, 135 are Evangelical (39.13%), 134 are Catholic (38.841%), 2 (0.58%) belong to the Palatinate State Free Religious Community, 7 (2.029%) belong to other religious groups and 67 (19.42%) either have no religion or will not reveal their religious affiliation.

== Politics ==
=== Municipal council ===
The council is made up of 8 council members, who were elected by majority vote at the municipal election held on 7 June 2009, and the honorary mayor as chairman.

=== Mayor ===
Argenschwang's mayor is Petra Ender.

=== Coat of arms ===
The municipality's arms might be described thus: Per fess countercompony of four Or and sable and sable a chevron, in base three lozenges one and two, dexter three lozenges and sinister the same, all argent.

The countercompony (two-row chequered) pattern in the upper field is drawn from arms once borne by the Counts of Sponheim. The composition in the lower field with the chevron and lozenges is drawn from a coat of arms set into the wall over the gateway into the castle. This may have been placed by Imperial Lieutenant Colonel Eberhard von Leyen (d. 1673) on the occasion of the castle's renovation.

== Culture and sightseeing ==
=== Buildings ===
The following are listed buildings or sites in Rhineland-Palatinate’s Directory of Cultural Monuments:

- Brunnenstraße 5 – Evangelical church; Gothic Revival quarrystone building, 1880–1883, town master builder Hartmann, Kreuznach (see also below)
- Am Ehrenmal 1 – former Lutheran rectory; Baroque timber-frame building, marked 1665
- Brunnenstraße 7 – former synagogue; three-part group of Baroque timber-frame buildings, 17th and 18th centuries (see also below)
- Brunnenstraße 9 – linear estate; timber-frame house, partly solid, possibly from the 18th century
- Brunnenstraße 11 – Baroque timber-frame house, possibly from the 18th century
- Brunnenstraße 23 – timber-frame house, about 1800
- Castle Argenschwang ruin, Ritterpfad 8 (monumental zone) – ruin of the Rosenburg, founded in the 12th century, destroyed about 1793: two floors of the palas, remnants of a bastion-like building with flanking towers, former three-floor gatehouse, 17th century (see also below)
- Jewish graveyard, Im Nauenweg (monumental zone) – area with 65 gravestones from 1870 to 1938 (see also below)

==== Evangelical church ====
Argenschwang's Evangelical church was built as a Gothic Revival quarrystone building in the years 1880 to 1883 to plans by town master builder Hartmann from Bad Kreuznach, and it was consecrated on Reformation Day (31 October) 1883. The church was renovated in 1979. Inside is an organ built in 1885 by the Brothers Oberlinger from Windesheim. The bells date from 1883 and were poured at the Klaren Bellfoundry in Bonn.

==== Former synagogue ====
The building that once housed the village synagogue is a more than 300-year-old two-floor timber-frame house with gable roof, rectangular windows and an attic floor. This building was bought by the Jewish community in the 18th century so that, after an expansion, a synagogue could be set up inside it. The prayer hall was on the upper floor; there was no women's gallery. The women's worship area was set apart from the rest by a screen. The prayer hall had a vaulted wooden ceiling that was painted with a starry-sky pattern. For almost 200 years, the Argenschwang synagogue was the hub of the local Jewish community's life. Then came the Nazis. On Kristallnacht (9–10 November 1938), Nazi stormtroopers laid the building's interior waste. In August 1939, a farmer bought the property. In 1950, the building was transferred back to the Bad Kreuznach/Birkenfeld Jewish religious community's ownership, but they later sold it again. On 25 July 1980, the old synagogue became a listed building, receiving monumental protection. That same year, the building had an outside makeover. More work was needed inside, where the prayer hall's wooden-beam ceiling had to be dismantled owing to structural damage.

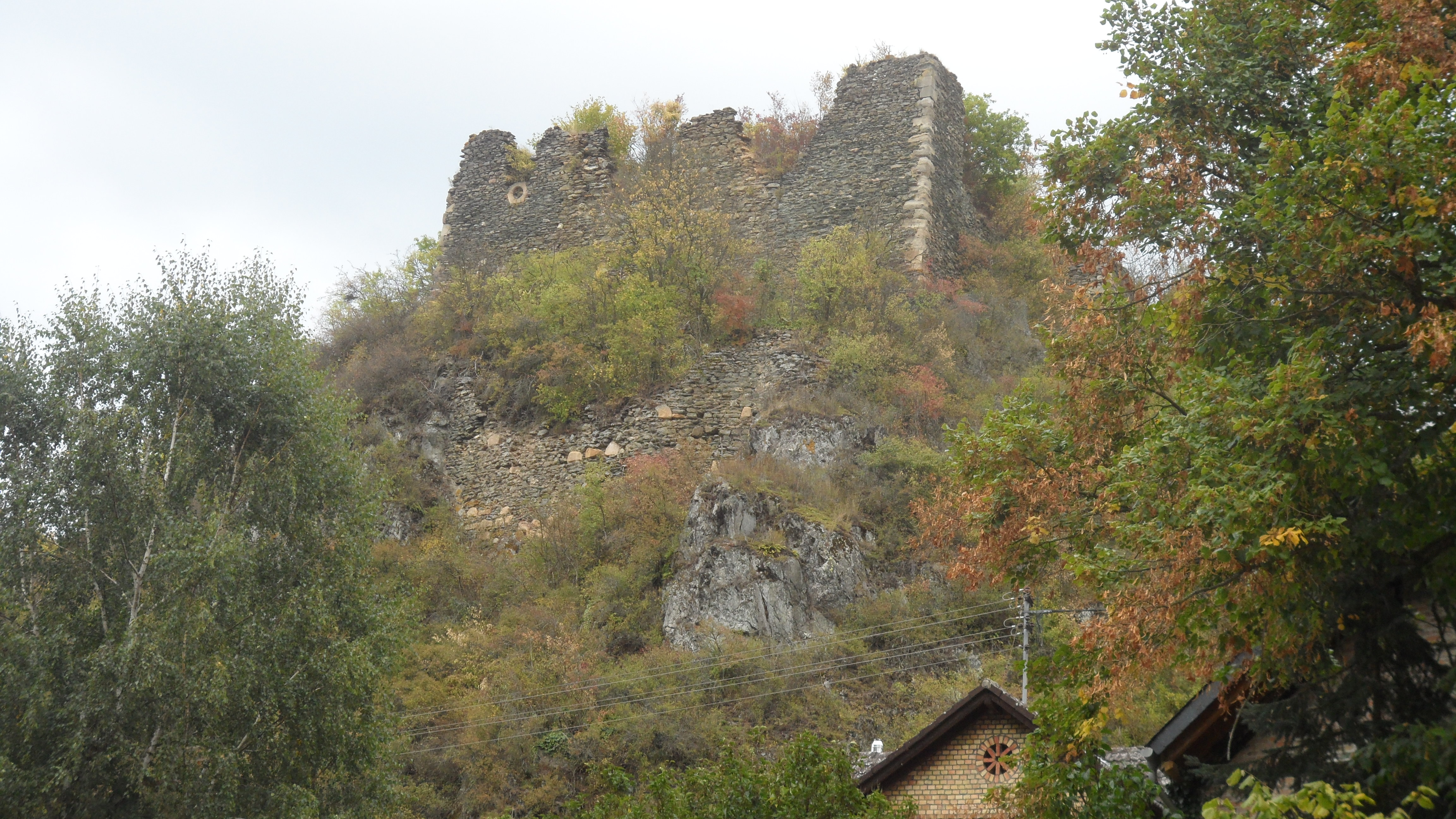
Rosenburg ruin

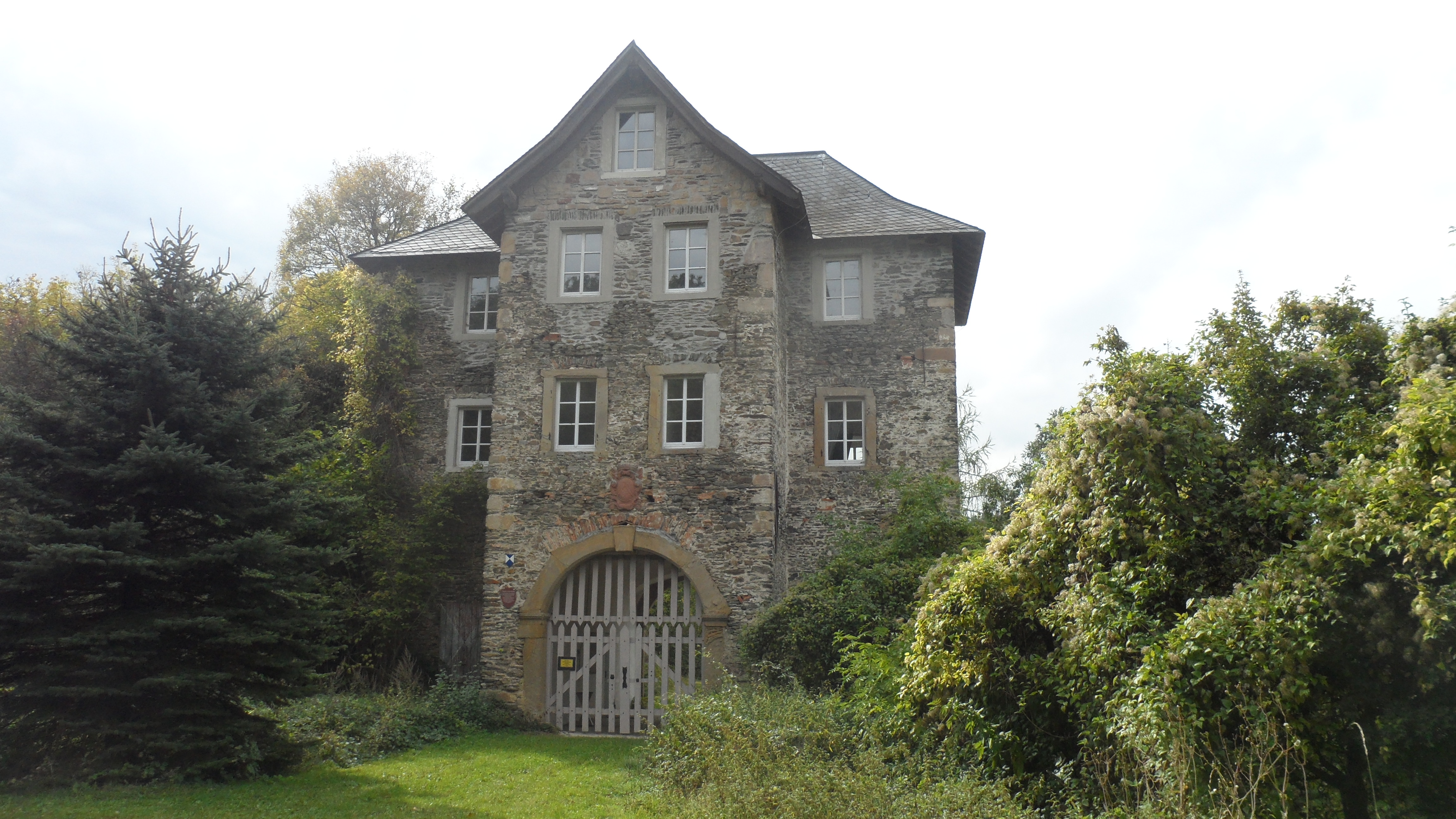
Rosenburg ruin; former gatehouse

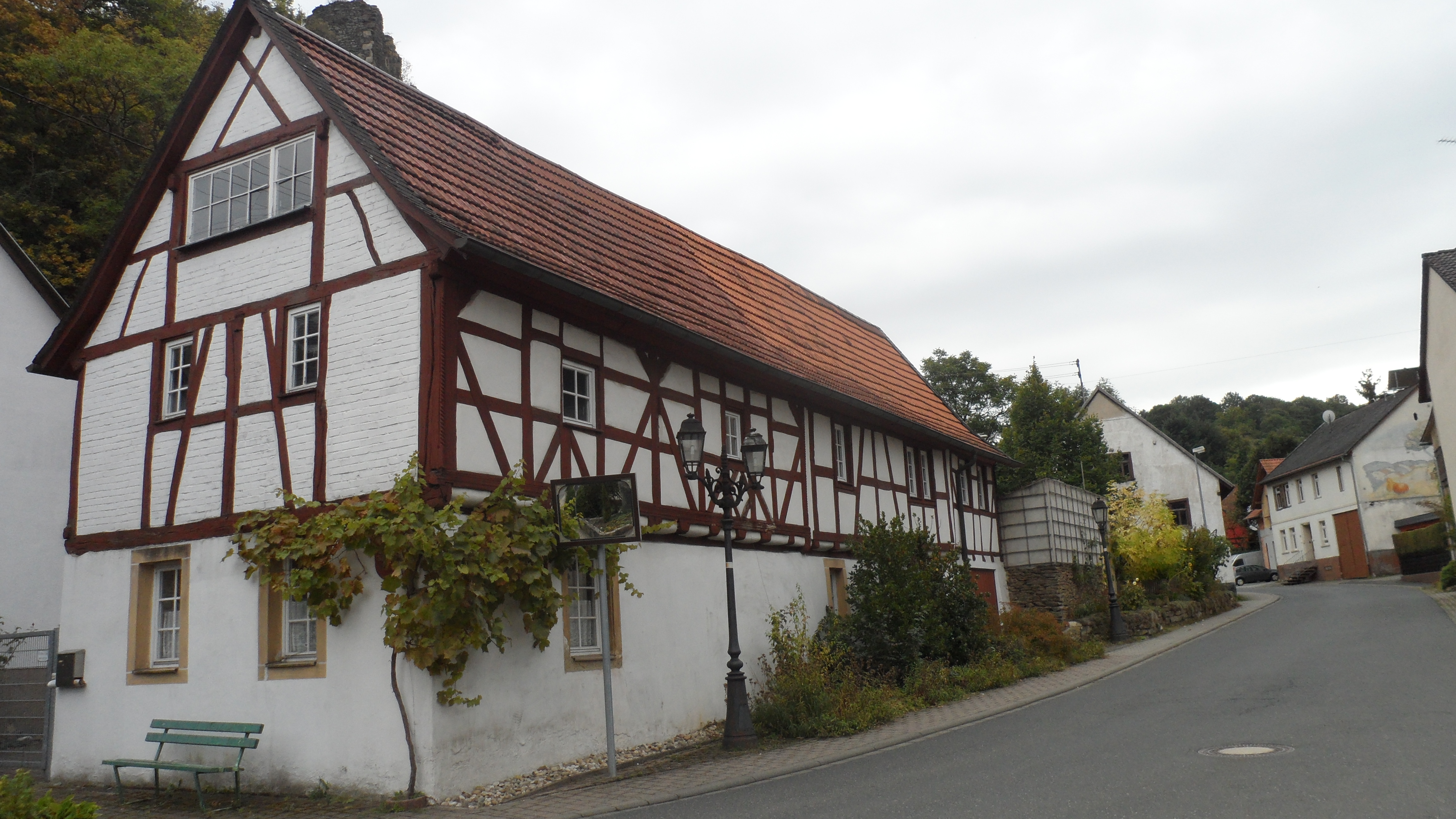
Former synagogue (17th and 18th centuries)

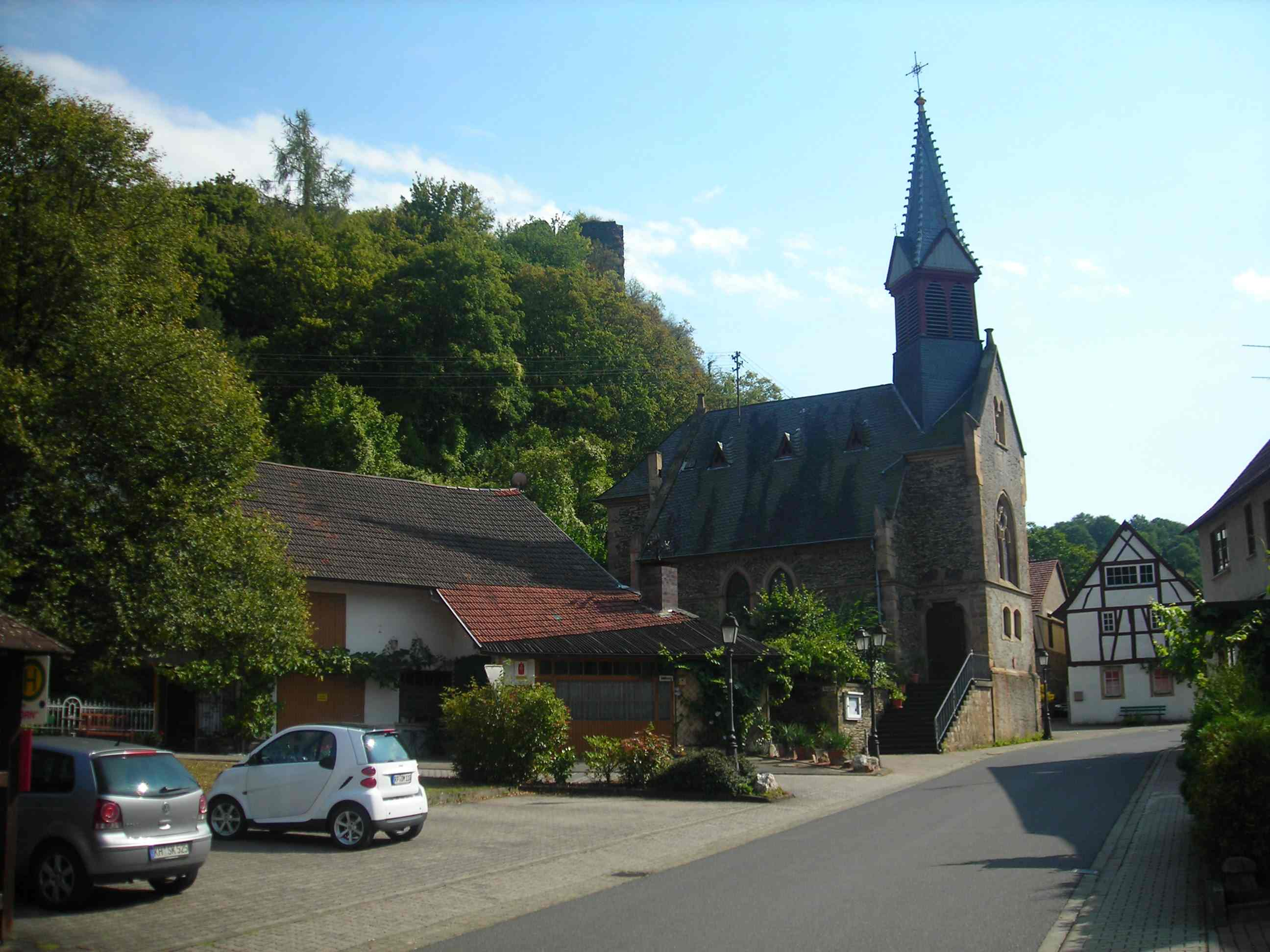
Argenschwang Church, in the background Castle Argenschwang

==== Castle Argenschwang ruin (Rosenburg) ====
The ruin stands at roughly 295 m above sea level. Castle Argenschwang was built in the 12th century by the Counts of Sponheim and had its first documentary mention in 1195. A further confirmed mention comes from 1332 when both the castle and the village were pledged to Simon von Ariswancke (possibly a sideline of the Counts of Sponheim that arose as a result of a child born out of wedlock). Beginning in 1416, the church found itself under the ownership of the Lords of Leyen. In 1758, it was sold to the Margrave of Baden. Thirty-five years later, in 1793, French Revolutionary troops destroyed it. In the southwest of the complex stands a two-floor former palas. In the northeast are remnants of a bastion-like, jutting building with round flanking towers. Of the castle complex itself, all that is left besides wall remnants is the former three-floor 17th-century gatehouse with the heraldic relief. The castle is today under private ownership and is used as a dwelling.

==== Jewish graveyard ====
The Jewish graveyard in Argenschwang was opened only about 1870. The last burial took place there in 1938 (Amalie Mayer née Fried, d. 18 January 1938). The graveyard has an area of 2 110 m². The fencing around this area today does not correspond with the plot's actual limits. The graveyard is made up of an old part and a new part. All together, 65 gravestones are preserved, although many are now missing their name tablets. In the front part, it is believed that during the time of the Third Reich, several gravestones were stolen. The names most commonly appearing on the gravestones are Schwarz, Gamiel, Hirsch, Mayer and Marx.

=== Sport and leisure ===
==== Swimming pool ====
Argenschwang's swimming pool owes its existence to a decree from the Nazi district chairman (Landrat) in 1938 whereby a few swimming pools were to be built within the district. Among the locations chosen for one of these was Argenschwang. In the so-called Bachwies (a rural cadastral area) a suitable plot of land was quickly found, allowing the pool's basin to be finished by late autumn 1939. However, owing to the hardships caused by the Second World War, which had already begun by this time, the pool could not be opened again until 1950. Later, from higher up, came orders demanding that a circulating system and changing rooms be built. This could only come about under great financial hardship, with the swimming pool only being opened again at the beginning of the 1972 season with the required building improvements completed. In the 1980s, there was a general need for the pool's basin to be renovated and thus once again, the municipality had to reach deep into its pockets to keep the swimming pool open. It was at this difficult time that the Schwimmbadförderverein (“Swimming Pool Promotional Association”) was founded, on 14 December 1989. This club has made it its business ever since to support the swimming pool in whatever way is needed. Since 1995, a solar heating system, new fencing and various other user-friendly things have been put in place. The communal will in the current promotional association and the old promotional club of 1947 have kept the swimming pool up and running to the present day.

==== Hiking trail ====
Argenschwang also has a 6.1 km-long hiking trail, the Rosenburgweg, that begins at the Evangelical church in the village core. While it leads hikers mostly through fields, meadows and woodland, it does also pass by the Castle Argenschwang (or Rosenburg) ruin. The trail is a circuit and therefore also ends at the church back in the village.

== Economy and infrastructure ==
=== Transport ===
Running through Argenschwang is Landesstraße 239, which leads to Dalberg in the east, while to the north, it leads through the Soonwald to Ellern. Meeting Landesstraße 239 in the middle of the village are Landesstraße 238, which leads to Allenfeld in the south, and Kreisstraße 30, which leads to Spabrücken in the north.
