= Münchwald =

- Municipality
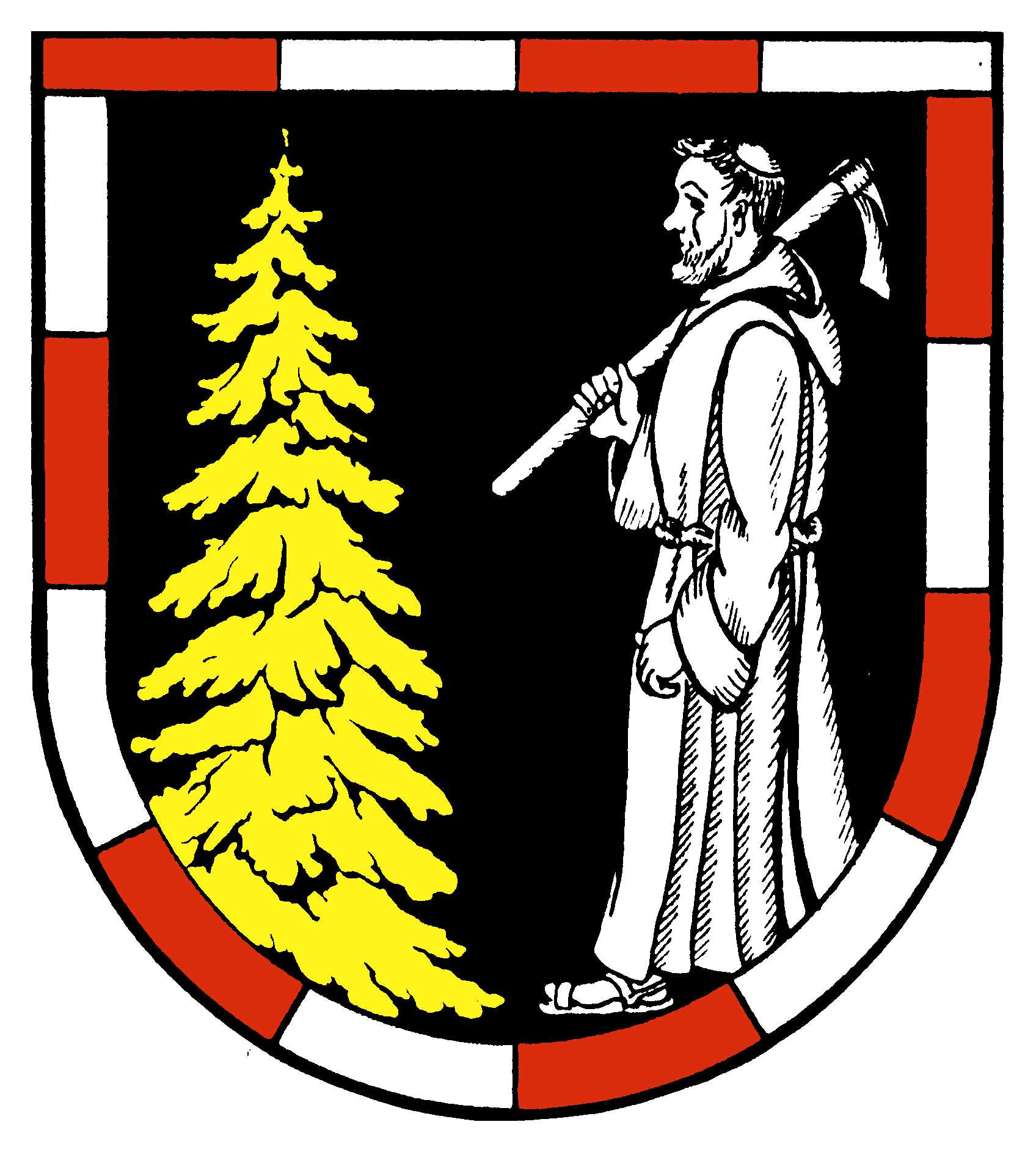
- Coat of arms

- Location of Münchwald within Bad Kreuznach district
- Interactive map of Münchwald
- Location within Germany Location within Rhineland-Palatinate
- Coordinates: 49°53′48″N 7°40′32″E
- Country: Germany
- State: Rhineland-Palatinate
- District: Bad Kreuznach
- Municipal assoc.: Rüdesheim

Government
  - Mayor (2019–24): Stephan Wagner

Area
  - Total: 1.46 km^{2} (0.56 sq mi)
- Elevation: 400 m (1,300 ft)

Population (2025-12-31)
  - Total: 283
  - Density: 194/km^{2} (502/sq mi)
- Time zone: UTC+01:00 (CET)
  - Summer (DST): UTC+02:00 (CEST)
- Postal codes: 55595
- Dialling codes: 06706
- Vehicle registration: KH
- Website: www.muenchwald.info

Münchwald is an Ortsgemeinde – a municipality belonging to a Verbandsgemeinde, a kind of collective municipality – in the Bad Kreuznach district in Rhineland-Palatinate, Germany. It belongs to the Verbandsgemeinde of Rüdesheim, whose seat is in the municipality of Rüdesheim an der Nahe. Münchwald is a state-recognized tourism community (Fremdenverkehrsort), and with a founding date going back only as far as the time around 1700, it is also one of the district's newest municipalities.

== Geography ==
=== Location ===
Münchwald lies roughly halfway between Bad Kreuznach and Simmern, about 20 km from each, in the southern Hunsrück, right at the Soonwald on a plateau, some 400 m above sea level.

=== Land use ===
As at 31 December 2012, the 1.46 km^{2} making up Münchwald's municipal area broke down as follows:

Use	Percentage
Agriculture	61.5
Woodland	15.2
Open water	1.4
Residential and transport	21.5
Other	0.4

=== Neighbouring municipalities ===
Clockwise from the north, Münchwald's neighbours are the municipalities of Spabrücken, Argenschwang and Spall and Gebroth, all of which likewise lie within the Bad Kreuznach district.

=== Constituent communities ===
Also belonging to Münchwald are the outlying homesteads of Haus Gräfenbach, Kesselshäuschen and Struthof.

== History ==
=== The Dadenborn monastic estate ===
At New Year's 1147, long before there was any village called Münchwald, the free noble Godebold III of Weierbach promised to take part in a crusade to the Holy Land. Since he did not keep this promise, he atoned for his sin by donating his estate, an area now within Münchwald's limits, to Bernard of Clairvaux, who then passed it on to the Cistercian Eberbach Abbey in the Rheingau (the building complex still stands near present-day Eltville). From this donation, enlarged by further donations, arose the Dadenborn monastic estate, as described in Eberbach Abbey's directory of holdings, the Oculus Memoriae (“Eye of Memory”). In 1219, Bishop of Speyer Conrad acknowledged the Dadenborn monastic estate's freedom from tithes. Professor Konrad Eckes interpreted the name Dadenborn as Dados Brunnen (or in English, “Dado’s Spring/Well”). The greatest part of the lands belonging to the monastic estate was wooded, and it had to be cleared by the monks, lay brethren and other, dependent people. The composition on Münchwald's coat of arms refers to this event. In a 1369 document, the monastic estate was mentioned once again. According to another document, this one handed down by the court at Spabrücken, the estate, which Eberbach Abbey had granted as a pledge to the Junker Ulrich von Leyen, was sometime between 1420 and 1476 given up. On 27 March 1531, Eberbach Abbey sold the Stewards of Worms, called von Dalberg, its forest near Spabrücken at the edge of the Soon, called Dadenborn, with all appurtenances for 1,150 Gulden in bad money in Electoral Mainz currency, with a Gulden reckoned to be worth 24 Albus. As to just where the monastic estate lay – nothing is now left of it – Jakob Leister gave the following information in a protocol received in 1764 in Trarbach, possibly by the Amtmann Fabert:

The district…is called…Münchwald because the monks lived in that very place (NB: The German word for “monk” is Mönch) and had their house in the area not far from the spring, where the master (meaning the knacker Roth; today Haus Fetsch) lives, about a stone’s throw therefrom, and it is known to everybody, since the foundations and the stone therefrom are still dug out. This house was in the end wholly in disrepair and the whole thing according to legend passed to the Lords of Dalberg…

As to the question of whether anything more of the old Münchwald was standing, Jakob Leister answered “Yes, at the Steinenberg and the ironworks something was left standing, but was especially hewn out”. Godebold's old estate may not have stood the test of time as a monastic institution, but it did at least establish the locality's, and thus the later village's, name.

=== Münchwald under the Dalbergs’ lordship ===
In 1700, the Imperial lordship gave the blacksmith Mathes Hauprich from Spabrücken and Jost Klein from Lingerhahn leave to lay out two estates on the Münchwald. They were allowed to clear and make into cropfields 60 Morgen in the so-called “forest”, which was measured out for them by the hunter and the Schultheiß of Spabrücken and by the surveyor. Furthermore, the meadows named the Phuhlwiese, the Molkenborner Wiese and the Hofackerwiese were to be made into orderly meadows. For building houses, farmsteads, barns and stables, places were set aside for the two men on the Rech (a steep but short, grassy slope). The buildings were to be arranged “in an orderly fashion and in a straight line”, which even today can still be seen on the village's main street. It was also agreed to grant Schwikert Hermann from Lingerhahn an estate of 30 Morgen on the Münchwald along with its attendant meadows, and he, too, was to add his house to the straight line. For the land that they had been granted, the settlers enjoyed nine years of freedom before they then had to pay a yearly rental. In 1701, two more men, Leonhard Hessel and Johann Freysem, were allowed to settle in Münchwald along with the three others, and they, too, were granted land that they could clear. In 1723, the families headed by Hermann Leister, Cornelius Bartholome, Anton Hessel, Franz Bauer and Philipp Klein lived in Münchwald. At the 1764 “Renovation”, for which a map was even compiled (a copy can be found at the municipal archive), properties consisted of farmyards, gardens, cropland and meadows in entailed estates held by the following:

Landholder	Area
Thomas Melsheimer	32½ Morgen, 25.2 Ruten
Oster Bartholome	33¾ Morgen, 37.2 Ruten
Johannes Pfälzer	37¾ Morgen, 15.2 Ruten
Philipp Klein	31½ Morgen, 11.2 Ruten
Johannes Roth	25½ Morgen, 37 Ruten
Georg Müller's widow	32½ Morgen, 23.2 Ruten
Dalenmühl	11¾ Morgen, 39 Ruten
So-called Müller Lipsen Mühl (mill)	4¼ Morgen, 19 Ruten

Even today, using this map and other cadastral surveys, those early settlers’ houses can be identified as ones still standing in the village now. In 1789, Friedrich Franz Karl, Steward of Worms, Baron of and at Dalberg, Electoral Mainz Secret Counsellor, in his capacity as administrator for his cousin Karl Alexander, who held title to the Münchwald together with its estates and the people bound to them, offered Münchwald for sale to the House of Baden. One reason for the sale is believed to have been that both parties had their interests in the place, which time and again had led to disputes over each party's rights. Selling Münchwald to Baden would end the continual disagreements. Whatever the grounds, on 30 October 1789, the sale agreement between Friedrich Franz Karl and Margrave Karl Friedrich of Baden was concluded, and Münchwald passed to Baden for a price of 16,000 Rhenish guilders. On 29 March 1790, representatives of the Badish Amt of Winterburg and the Dalberg Amt of Wallhausen met at knacker Roth's house in Münchwald to discuss implementing the sale agreement. The next day, the dwellers of Münchwald's farms, namely Johannes Müller, Philipp Klein, Thomas Pfälzer, Wilhelm Bartholome, Peter Tullius, Adam and Andreas Roth (the late Johannes Roth's sons), Johannes Pfälzer, Konrad Pfälzer and Peter Müller, had to appear in Winterburg to render homage to the Margrave of Baden. The Margraviate of Baden, though, did not hold Münchwald for very long, for already by the 1790s, French Revolutionary troops had occupied the German lands on the Rhine’s left bank and incorporated them into the French State. During the time of Revolutionary and later Napoleonic French rule – the exact date is unknown, but might have been 1804 or 1805 – Münchwald became part of the municipality of Spall, or at least documents dealing with Münchwald were issued by the municipality of Spall. Beginning in 1822, the municipality of Spall insisted upon splitting the municipal union, reasoning that Münchwald was set apart from Spall by Spall boundary stones anyway, and that in the event of longstanding ties with Spall, Münchwald villagers would deem themselves entitled to claim rights to Spall’s communal resources.

=== The Dittenburger, Litter and Roth families of knackers ===
The knacker Heinrich Dittenburger (also Dillenburger) was sent in 1705 by the joint Sponheim government from Spall to Münchwald to preserve Sponheim’s rights in Münchwald. He was given the use of a cottage belonging to the Dalberg subjects that had stood empty owing to disagreements between the inhabitants of the Amt of Winterburg and the Münchwald villagers. He was to make as much land into cropland as the Dalberg subjects had cleared. Heinrich Dittenburger, however, died in 1707. His widow Susanna (d. 28 August 1759), married Lorenz Litter (d. 24 June 1758), likewise a knacker, in 1708. He, too, was “forced by the common lordship to remain on the Münchwald to oppose Dalberg intentions as much as possible”. Lorenz Litter had built himself a house by 1727 and had at last set up his estate. Seemingly, the knacker was even accepted over time by the Dalberg lordship, for on 15 March 1730, Franz Eckenbert, Steward of Worms and Baron of Dalberg, awarded him the right to practise the knacker's trade in the Dalberg lordly domain “as long as he lives”, and also the Molkenborner Wiese (a meadow), although he had to pay for this right. The fee was 10 Rhenish guilders yearly, to be paid each year at Martinmas to the stewardship in Wallhausen. From the Sponheim side, too, Lorenz Litter received a letter of Erbbestand (a uniquely German landhold arrangement in which ownership rights and usage rights are separated; this is forbidden by law in modern Germany) dated 25 June 1737. On 8 October 1737, the knacker Johannes Roth from Wesel wed Anna Maria, Lorenz Litter's daughter, and thus founded the Family Roth, who lived in Münchwald until the early 20th century. The Family Roth also earned great fame as Knochenheiler (“bone healers”).

=== The Struthof ===
Johann Adam Melsheimer, the founder of the House of Struthof, was born in Altendambach near Schleusingen in Thuringia. The Thuringian Melsheimers arose from an old Palatine family of foresters who in 1570 were granted a coat of arms by that state. This was renewed in 1668, and since 1939 it has adorned the Struthof. It shows a hunter with a hunting-dog lead and a hunting horn on the escutcheon, and the same figure forms the crest. In line with family tradition, J.A. Melsheimer chose as his future profession forester and hunter. On the Electorate of the Palatinate hunting estate of Bruchhausen near Heidelberg he was trained. His first posting was in the Odenwald. Afterwards he came in 1719 as a trained and experienced forester to the Oberamt of Kreuznach and to the Soon (part of the Hunsrück). It is believed that since he was not from this area, but rather from Electorate of the Palatinate, people called him "the hunter from the Palatinate" (der Jäger aus Kurpfalz), and became the subject of the well known folk song "Ein Jäger aus Kurpfalz". In 1722, Johann Adam Melsheimer acquired for 500 Rhenish guilders a parcel of woodland measuring 75 Prussian Morgen (roughly 19 ha), on one part of which he built his Jägerhof or Försterhof, which he held in Erbbestand. He thus became the founder of the Struthof. This homestead formerly went by both those other names mentioned just above, and also by the name Melsheimerhof. Melsheimer had special rights that he had been granted by the Electorate of the Palatinate court stewardship, and he bequeathed them to his successors. Among these were the right to transfer his office to his son, the right to fetch firewood from the forest and the right to let his livestock graze in the forest. For 38 years Johann Adam Melsheimer lived in the Soon, about which one can still read from a stone tablet at the Haus Wingenter Struthof 11:

German	English translation
Johann Adam Melsheimer erbaute 1723 dieses Haus als “Erbbestandenen Jäger- oder Försterhof”, der als solcher auch seinen Nachfahren bis ins 4. Glied diente: Friedrich Konrad, Ägidius und Friedrich. Der Erbauer war von 1719 bis 1757 kurpfälzischer reitender Förster im unteren Soon und hieß nach Überlieferung und Forschung: “Der Jäger aus Kurpfalz” 21.5.1939 Die Sippe Melsheimer	Johann Adam Melsheimer built this house in 1723 as a hunter's or forester's estate held in Erbbestand, which as such served his descendants down to the fourth member: Friedrich Konrad, Ägidius and Friedrich. The builder was from 1719 to 1757 an Electoral Palatinate mounted forester in the lower Soon and was called according to stories handed down and research “The Hunter from Electoral Palatinate” 21.5.1939 the Melsheimer kin

After Johann Adam Melsheimer's death, his son Conrad Melsheimer inherited his father's estate. He took over the hunter's estate and his father's job. After the Rhineland became French, Conrad Melsheimer lost his hereditary job as forester in 1809 and the rights pertaining thereto. The estate, however, remained in the Family Melsheimer's ownership. The heiress to the estate was Conrad Melsheimer's daughter, who married the pharmacist Friedrich Wilhelm Wandesleben from Sobernheim. She did not live at the Struthof. On 27 May 1830, the now Widow Wandesleben offered her Struthof for sale to the taxation authorities. It is believed, though, that she sold Heinrich Faust the estate, no later than 1832, but he had to leave it, presumably on economic grounds, sometime about 1838. Following him as a tenant was Philipp Mathias, who in 1840 was waging a legal battle with an unnamed owner, and likewise ended up having to give up his rural estate on economic grounds. In that same year, Johann Wingenter acquired the Struthof. Johann Wingenter, born in 1781 in Zemmer near Trier, had first moved from the Eifel to Gebroth. He was married to Louisa, herself born into the Family Wingenter, and from the Westerwald. Their daughter Louise married Gebroth native Johann Adam Knötgen, from a family of potters who also plied their trade in Münchwald. The next three generations of potters at the Struthof were:

- Peter Ignatz Wingenter, b. 1808
- Wilhelm Wingenter, b. 1836
- Johann Wingenter, b. 1877

Johann Wingenter's brother Peter Wingenter founded another pottery shop in Münchwald about 1914, now the property at Dorfstraße 17. Later came Albert Wingenter sen., born in 1922, and Albert Wingenter jun., born in 1953, still works at the potter's trade after six generations.

=== The municipality of Münchwald, 1822–1945 ===
In 1822, the Prussian Rhine Province was created, with the Chief President's seat in Koblenz and Regierungsbezirke headquartered in Cologne, Düsseldorf, Aachen, Koblenz and Trier. The mairies (“mayoralties”) that had been set up during French rule were kept, and simply had their terminology Germanized: they would henceforth be known as Bürgermeistereien (also “mayoralties”). Münchwald thus belonged to the Bürgermeisterei of Wallhausen in the Kreuznach district. This was administered by a Bürgermeister (“mayor”) while the individual villages each had a reeve (Gemeindevorsteher). This same basic administrative structure persists even today in the Verbandsgemeinde. Münchwald's known reeves are listed in the table below under Mayors. In the 19th century, more families came to settle in Münchwald. The village thus had 81 inhabitants living in 12 houses in 1843. People earned their livelihoods mainly at agriculture, although there were also forestry workers and day labourers at the Gräfenbacher Hütte (ironworks). In the mid 19th century, the family of potters Knötgen settled in Münchwald, as did the Family Wingenter at the Struthof. The official municipal documents and acts from this time make clear over and over the mean circumstances endured by the municipality and its inhabitants. Until the closure of the Gräfenbacher Hütte in 1886 or 1887, the Münchwald-Gräfenbacher Hütte schoolteacher's post was governed by one schoolteacher who taught in the morning at the ironworks and in the afternoon in the village, where school was held in a rented house. In 1888, the new school building could finally be procured, after council had been discussing building one since the 1860s. In 1927, a floor was added to this building. Beginning in 1879, the village's streets were developed bit by bit. In 1906, Münchwald was connected to the telephone network; the first telephone is believed to have been installed at the Roth inn. The village had electricity as of 1912. The village's water supply came from wells. In 1906, Münchwald council held consultations about building a watermain for the first time. Any plans for such a thing, however, were repeatedly shelved for a lack of financing, and the watermain was not built until 1930-1931. About whatever effects the First World War had on Münchwald, little is known for lack of any sources. It is likely that the most noticeable effect on the village was the steady stream of young men who were called into service in the Kaiser's forces. With the end of the war, the monarchy was overthrown and replaced with the Weimar Republic, the first semblance of democracy that Germany had ever had. Economic difficulties and the Weimar Republic's weakness made it possible for Adolf Hitler and the Nazis to seize power in 1933. The Gleichschaltung of all political and social institutions and the permeation of everyday life with the National Socialist mindset was noticeable even in Münchwald. Beginning in 1939, men were being called into the Wehrmacht to go to war; many of them fell. In memory of those who had fallen in both world wars, a monument was erected in Münchwald in 1959, financed out of private citizens’ donations. In the spring of 1945, the Nahe region was occupied by American troops, but then later transferred to the French zone of occupation. American soldiers were also stationed in Münchwald, billeted at, among other places, the Haus Christ at the Struthof.

=== Since 1945 ===
After the Second World War, civil administration was reconstituted. All the mayors (Bürgermeister) that Münchwald has had since then are listed in the table below under Mayors. In the early 1950s, the chapel-building club was founded under then schoolteacher Dr. Konrad Eckes's leadership. It built Saint Conrad's Chapel (Kapelle St. Konrad), which was financed through donations, and which was named after its patron, Saint Conrad of Parzham. The consecration was celebrated on 29 August 1954. In 1968, the municipality built a mortuary at the graveyard, again financing it through donations. In 1950, the municipality took over all financial repayment obligations from the Münchwald Watermain Collective that it had incurred through the actual building of the watermain in 1930. This also brought the watermain under the municipality's ownership. In late 1960, municipal council passed a bylaw dealing with the village's connection to the public waterworks and water contributions thereto. Council made a decision to procure and install water meters and put it into action in 1963. Since Münchwald was always struggling with a dearth of water, it was decided to dig a deep-bore well. This was successful, and the waterworks were improved in 1967 with a newly built high-level water cistern. Also after the Second World War, a shift in structure set in, at first only in fits and starts. While many people in Münchwald still earned their livelihoods in farming, others had already found other earning opportunities at the industrial works in Bad Kreuznach. After Adam Hart had opened his tourist pension at the Struthof as early as 1932 or 1933, tourism began to become a significant economic factor in Münchwald beginning in the 1960s. Also rising alongside the existing pottery craft were other crafts and, especially in the 1980s and 1990s, there came new businesses in the service sector. At the same time, there was also a shift towards becoming a residential community. Today, many villagers drive to work in the Frankfurt Rhine-Main region. The structural shift also led to there being no more grocery shop in Münchwald. Such shops had been run after the First World War by Ottilie Tullius, then beginning in 1920 by Friedrich Kessel, in 1930 by the Family Lauterbach, and then by the Family Bamberger. Finally, from 1968 to 1979, the Family Knötgen ran one. Ever since, there have been no shops at all in Münchwald. In 1966, the school in Münchwald was dissolved. Ever since, the schoolchildren have had to attend the primary school and Hauptschule in Wallhausen, and any higher schools are to be had in Bad Kreuznach and Hargesheim. The schoolhouse was wholly at the municipality's disposal. Temporarily, the schoolroom was converted into a dwelling and, like the teacher's former dwelling upstairs, was let. After the tenant on the ground floor moved out in 1992, the municipality built the old schoolroom into a community hall with seating for 55, which is now used for festive events and as a conference room. For bigger events and for the sport association's exercise sessions, there is the Hubertus-Halle, built in 1979, a former school pavilion belonging to the Alfred-Delp-Schule Hargesheim. Münchwald's rising attractiveness as a residential community was accommodated by the opening of the Frauenwald new building zone in 1969. Another new building zone called Münchheide opened in 1983. It begins at Soonwaldstraße and ends down from the Struthof, thus also affording a road link between Münchwald (main centre) and the outlying Struthof. It was decided in 1999 to expand Münchheide by 9 lots after the zone had been all but filled. The expansion is called Münchheide II. From 1965 to 1970, Münchwald repeatedly participated in the contest Unser Dorf soll schöner werden (“Our village should become lovelier”), and even won a gold badge at the 1970 state-level competition. In 2000, the municipality of Münchwald celebrated its 300th anniversary.

=== Population development ===
Münchwald's population development since Napoleonic times is shown in the table below. The figures for the years from 1871 to 1987 are drawn from census data:

Year	Inhabitants
1815	101
1835	115
1871	164
1905	190
1939	171

Year	Inhabitants
1950	202
1961	192
1970	226
1987	252
2005	310

== Religion ==
As at 30 November 2013, there are 300 full-time residents in Münchwald, and of those, 80 are Evangelical (26.667%), 135 are Catholic (45%), 1 is Russian Orthodox (0.333%), 3 (1%) belong to other religious groups and 81 (27%) either have no religion or will not reveal their religious affiliation.

== Politics ==
=== Municipal council ===
The council is made up of 8 council members, who were elected by proportional representation at the municipal election held on 7 June 2009, and the honorary mayor as chairman. The eight seats are shared between two voters’ groups.

=== Mayors ===
The following table lists Münchwald's known reeves (Vorsteher or Gemeindevorsteher) and mayors (Bürgermeister):

Tenure	Name	Title	Remarks
1847	Anton Wies	Vorsteher	—
1855-1866	Josef Donsbach	Vorsteher	—
1866	Philipp Eckes	Vorsteher	—
1870-1887	Wilhelm Wies	Vorsteher	—
1887-1912	Adam Eckes	Vorsteher	—
1914-1915	Tullius	Gemeindevorsteher	Called into forces; acting reeve: Klein
1919	Franz Tullius	Vorsteher	—
1924-1932	Peter Wingenter	Gemeindevorsteher	Died in 1932
1932-1936	Tullius	Vorsteher	—
1936-1945	?	?	Nazi mayor unknown
1946	Johann Valerius 1946	Bürgermeister	—
1949-1957	Wilhelm Eckes	Bürgermeister	Died on 8 April 1957
1957-1962	Johann Knötgen	Bürgermeister	—
1962	Johann Valerius	Bürgermeister	—
1964-1982	Raimund Spang	Bürgermeister	Died on 5 April 1982
1982-1999	Johann Christ	Bürgermeister	—
1999-2009	Joachim Paul	Bürgermeister	—
2009-	Stephan Wagner	Bürgermeister	Current mayor

The reeves headed the village at a time when Münchwald was grouped into a Bürgermeisterei (“mayoralty”), which had a mayor for several villages and a Vorsteher (reeve) in each constituent village.

=== Coat of arms ===
The German blazon reads: In schwarzem Schild eine goldene Tanne, neben der ein Mönch mit einer Rodehacke steht.

The municipality's arms might in English heraldic language be described thus: Sable dexter a fir tree Or and sinister a monk passant holding in his dexter hand a clearing hoe resting on his dexter shoulder argent, the whole with a bordure compony gules and argent.

The German blazon makes no mention of the bordure, nor of the monk's tincture.

The charges in the arms refer to the clearing of the forest by the monks from the Cistercian monastery, Eberbach Abbey, who established a monastic estate in the Münchwald area called Dadenborn about 1200. The tinctures Or and sable (gold and black) symbolize the Lordship of Dalberg, while the tinctures gules and argent (red and silver) in the bordure stand for the County of Sponheim. The arms were introduced in this form upon municipal council's decision on 23 February 1948, later receiving approval from the Rhineland-Palatinate Ministry of the Interior on 4 April 1950.

== Culture and sightseeing ==
=== Buildings ===
The following are listed buildings or sites in Rhineland-Palatinate’s Directory of Cultural Monuments:

- Dorfstraße 1 – former monastic estate of Eberbach Abbey; groin-vaulted livestock stable, possibly from the mid 19th century
- Dorfstraße 2 – estate complex along the street; stately timber-frame house, partly solid, about 1800
- Dorfstraße 2a – post-Baroque house, marked 1806, barn, partly timber-frame, 18th century
- Near Im Wiesengrund 1 – quarrystone wall remnants, mediaeval (?)
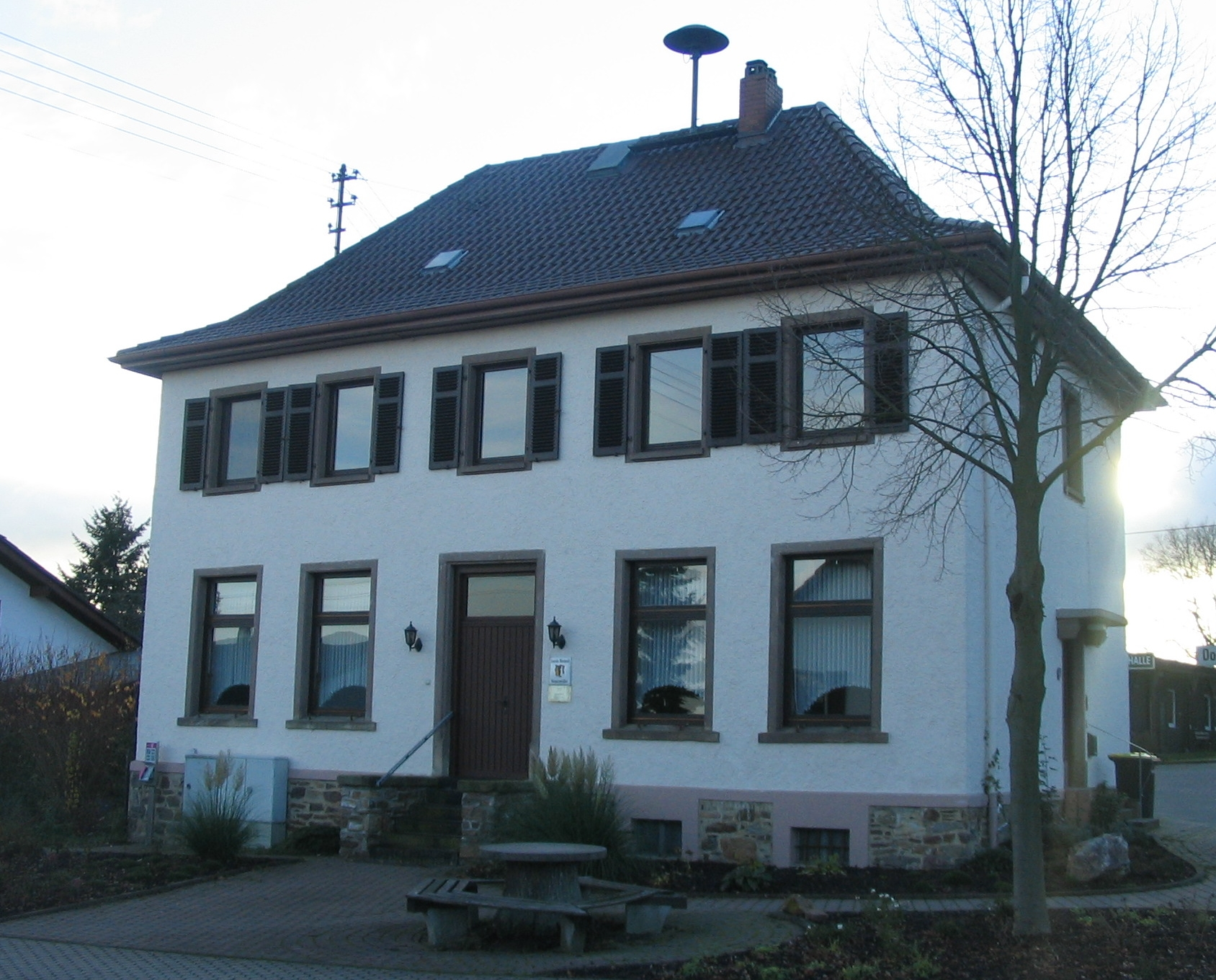
Municipal hall in the historic village centre

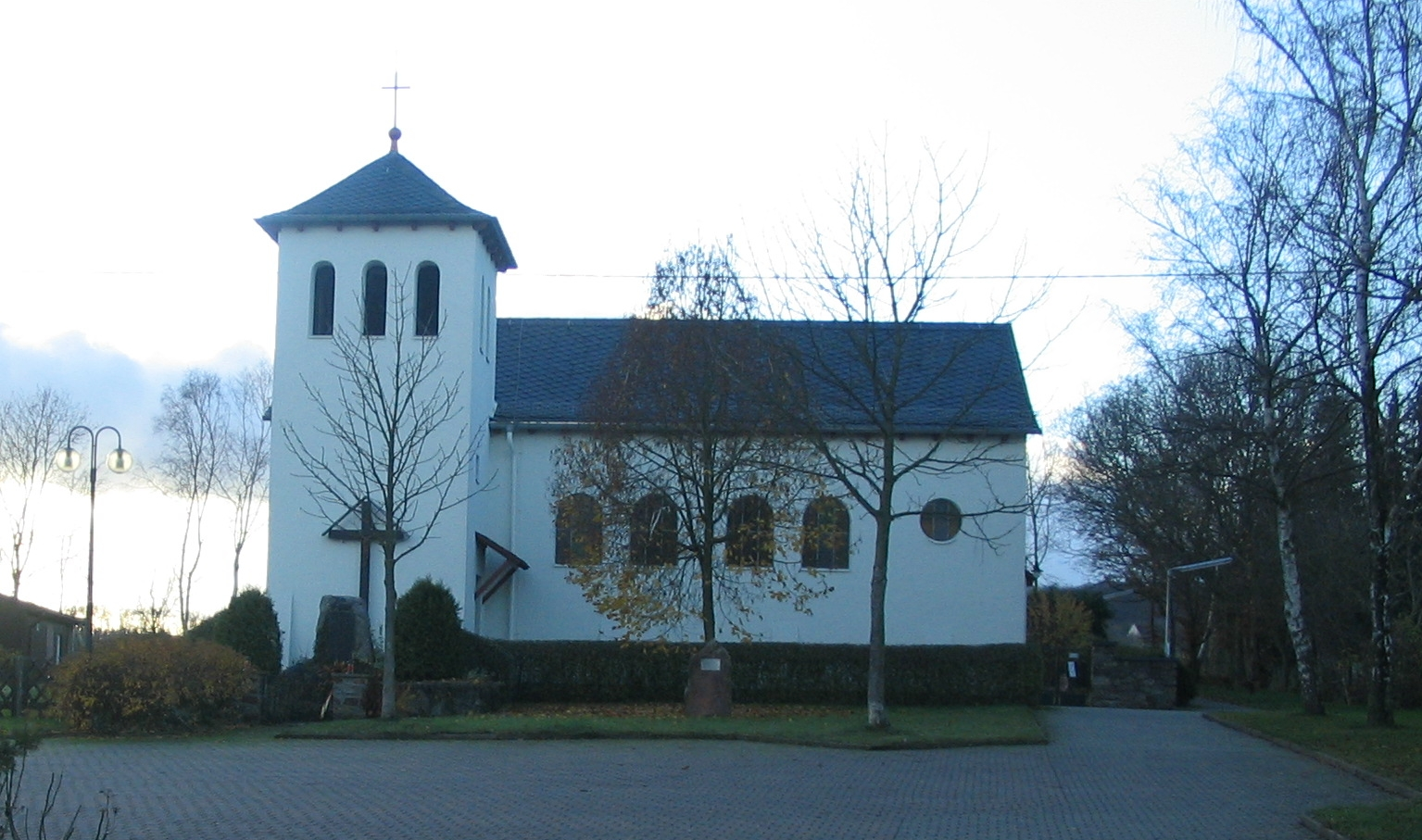
Chapel

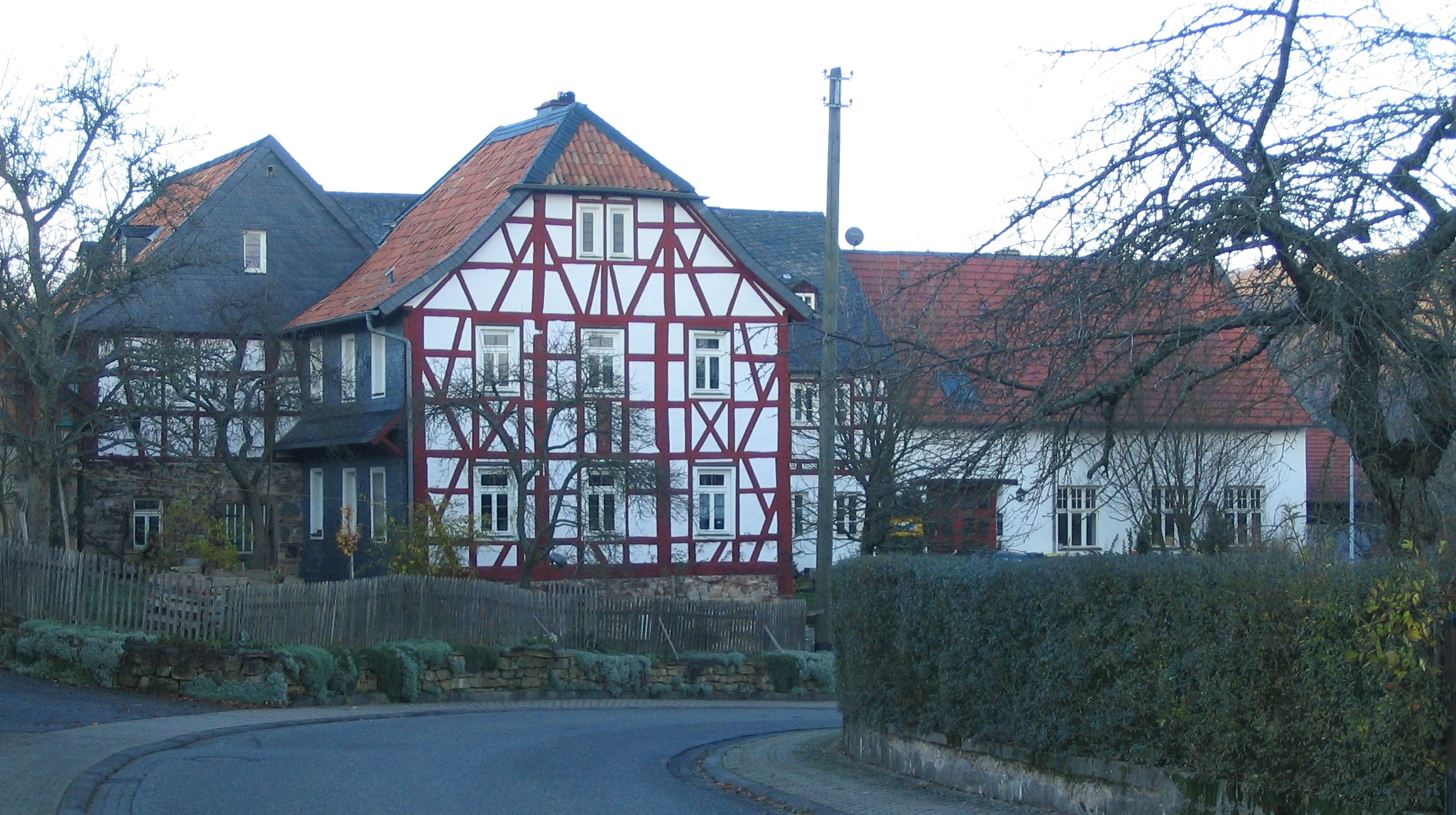
Traditional timber-frame house

=== Clubs ===
The following clubs are active in Münchwald:

- Freiwillige Feuerwehr — volunteer fire brigade
- Freunde der Freiwilligen Feuerwehr Münchwald e.V. — friends of the volunteer fire brigade
- Sportgemeinschaft Münchwald e.V. — sport association
- Volksbildungswerk Münchwald — “people’s education”

== Economy and infrastructure ==
=== Transport ===
Meeting in Münchwald are Kreisstraßen 28 and 29, while Landesstraßen 230 and 239 skirt the village. Münchwald lies roughly equidistant between Bundesstraßen 41 (nearest interchange at Waldböckelheim) and 50 (nearest interchange at Argenthal), with each highway some 10 km away. The nearest Autobahn interchange, onto the Autobahn A 61 (Koblenz–Ludwigshafen) is at Stromberg. Also serving Waldböckelheim is a railway station on the Nahe Valley Railway (Bingen–Saarbrücken).

== Famous people ==
=== Famous people associated with the municipality town ===
- Johann Adam Melsheimer (1683–1757), a forester and hunter born in Thuringia (see The Struthof above), a real-life model for the Jäger aus Kurpfalz (“Hunter from the Electoral Palatinate”, the subject of a well known folksong)
