= Seibersbach =

- Municipality
- Coat of arms

- Location of Seibersbach within Bad Kreuznach district
- Interactive map of Seibersbach
- Location within Germany Location within Rhineland-Palatinate
- Coordinates: 49°57′42.29″N 7°42′55.69″E
- Country: Germany
- State: Rhineland-Palatinate
- District: Bad Kreuznach
- Municipal assoc.: Langenlonsheim-Stromberg

Government
  - Mayor (2019–24): Ralf Gorden Noch (FW)

Area
  - Total: 14.64 km^{2} (5.65 sq mi)
- Elevation: 345 m (1,132 ft)

Population (2025-12-31)
  - Total: 1,304
  - Density: 89.07/km^{2} (230.7/sq mi)
- Time zone: UTC+01:00 (CET)
  - Summer (DST): UTC+02:00 (CEST)
- Postal codes: 55444
- Vehicle registration: KH

Seibersbach is a municipality in the district of Bad Kreuznach in Rhineland-Palatinate, in western Germany.
