= Spabrücken =

- Municipality
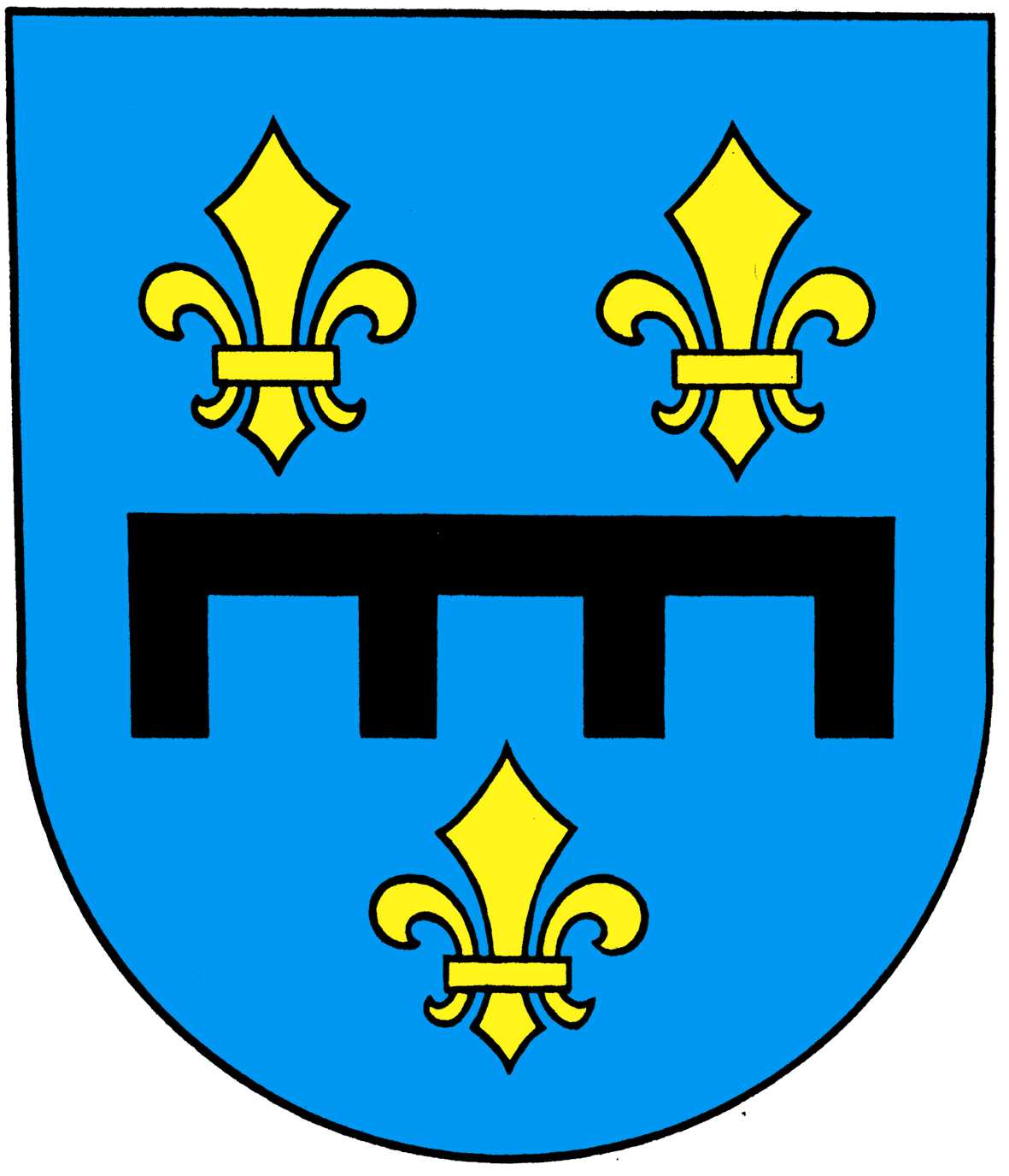
- Coat of arms

- Location of Spabrücken within Bad Kreuznach district
- Interactive map of Spabrücken
- Location within Germany Location within Rhineland-Palatinate
- Coordinates: 49°53′56.46″N 7°42′44.89″E
- Country: Germany
- State: Rhineland-Palatinate
- District: Bad Kreuznach
- Municipal assoc.: Rüdesheim

Government
  - Mayor (2019–24): Johannes Thilmann

Area
  - Total: 16.61 km^{2} (6.41 sq mi)
- Elevation: 360 m (1,180 ft)

Population (2025-12-31)
  - Total: 1,196
  - Density: 72.00/km^{2} (186.5/sq mi)
- Time zone: UTC+01:00 (CET)
  - Summer (DST): UTC+02:00 (CEST)
- Postal codes: 55595
- Dialling codes: 06706
- Vehicle registration: KH
- Website: www.spabruecken.de

Spabrücken is a municipality in the district of Bad Kreuznach in Rhineland-Palatinate, in western Germany. It has a population of 1,218 residents.
