= Kirn-Land =

Verbandsgemeinde in Rhineland-Palatinate

Coordinates: 49°47′17″N 7°27′26″E

Kirn-Land is a former Verbandsgemeinde ("collective municipality") in the district of Bad Kreuznach, in Rhineland-Palatinate, Germany. It was located around the town Kirn, which was the seat of Kirn-Land, but not part of the Verbandsgemeinde. On 1 January 2020 it was merged into the new Verbandsgemeinde Kirner Land.

Kirn-Land consisted of the following Ortsgemeinden ("local municipalities"):

- Bärenbach
- Becherbach bei Kirn
- Brauweiler
- Bruschied
- Hahnenbach
- Heimweiler
- Heinzenberg
- Hennweiler
- Hochstetten-Dhaun
- Horbach
- Kellenbach
- Königsau
- Limbach
- Meckenbach
- Oberhausen bei Kirn
- Otzweiler
- Schneppenbach
- Schwarzerden
- Simmertal
- Weitersborn
