= Bruschied =

- Municipality
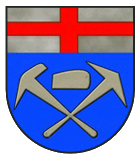
- Coat of arms

- Location of Bruschied within Bad Kreuznach district
- Interactive map of Bruschied
- Location within Germany Location within Rhineland-Palatinate
- Coordinates: 49°50′04″N 7°24′24″E
- Country: Germany
- State: Rhineland-Palatinate
- District: Bad Kreuznach
- Municipal assoc.: Kirner Land

Government
  - Mayor (2019–24): Thomas Engbarth

Area
  - Total: 2.67 km^{2} (1.03 sq mi)
- Elevation: 409 m (1,342 ft)

Population (2025-12-31)
  - Total: 292
  - Density: 109/km^{2} (283/sq mi)
- Time zone: UTC+01:00 (CET)
  - Summer (DST): UTC+02:00 (CEST)
- Postal codes: 55606
- Dialling codes: 06544
- Vehicle registration: KH

Bruschied is an Ortsgemeinde – a municipality belonging to a Verbandsgemeinde, a kind of collective municipality – in the Bad Kreuznach district in Rhineland-Palatinate, Germany. It belongs to the Verbandsgemeinde Kirner Land, whose seat is in the town of Kirn.

== Geography ==
=== Location ===
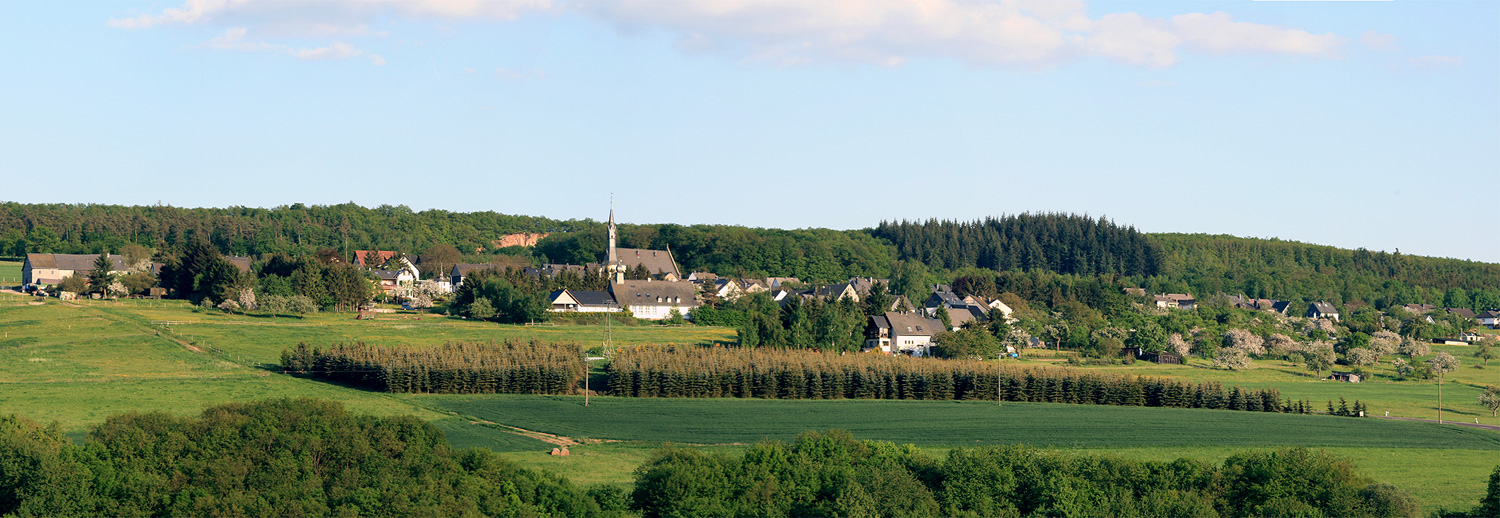
Bruschied in the Lützelsoon

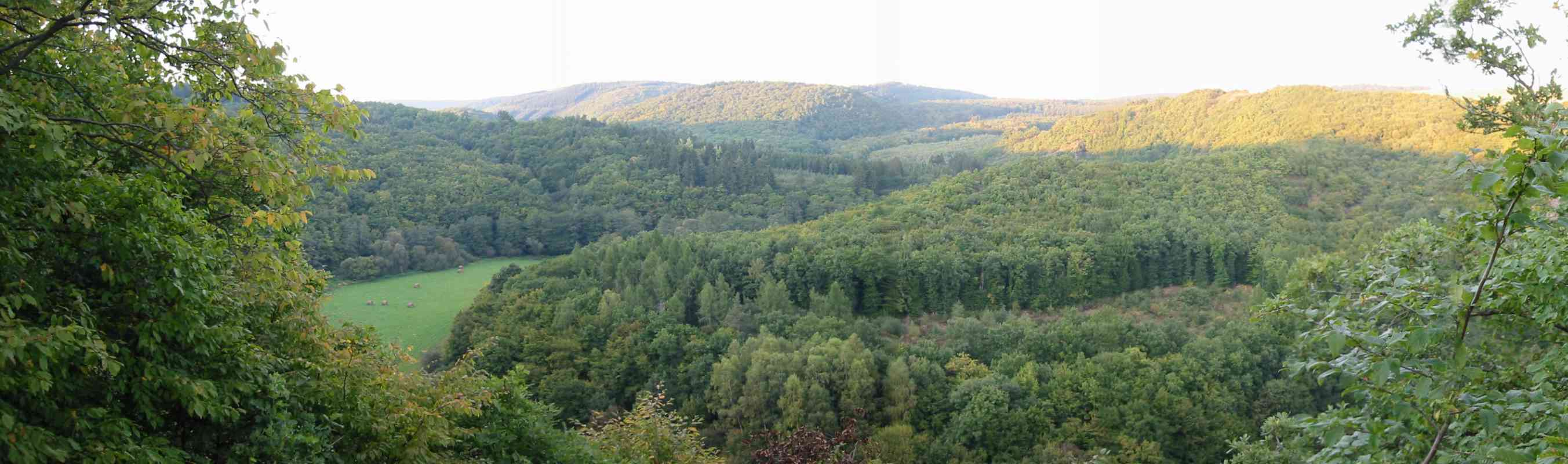
Hahnenbachtal

Bruschied lies in the southern Hunsrück, west of the Lützelsoon plateau. The Lützelsoon Cycleway (Lützelsoon-Radweg) runs through the village.

=== Land use ===
As at 31 December 2009, land use in Bruschied breaks down thus:

- Agriculture: 37.6%
- Woodland: 45.8%
- Open water: 1.0%
- Residential and transport: 15.6%

=== Neighbouring municipalities ===
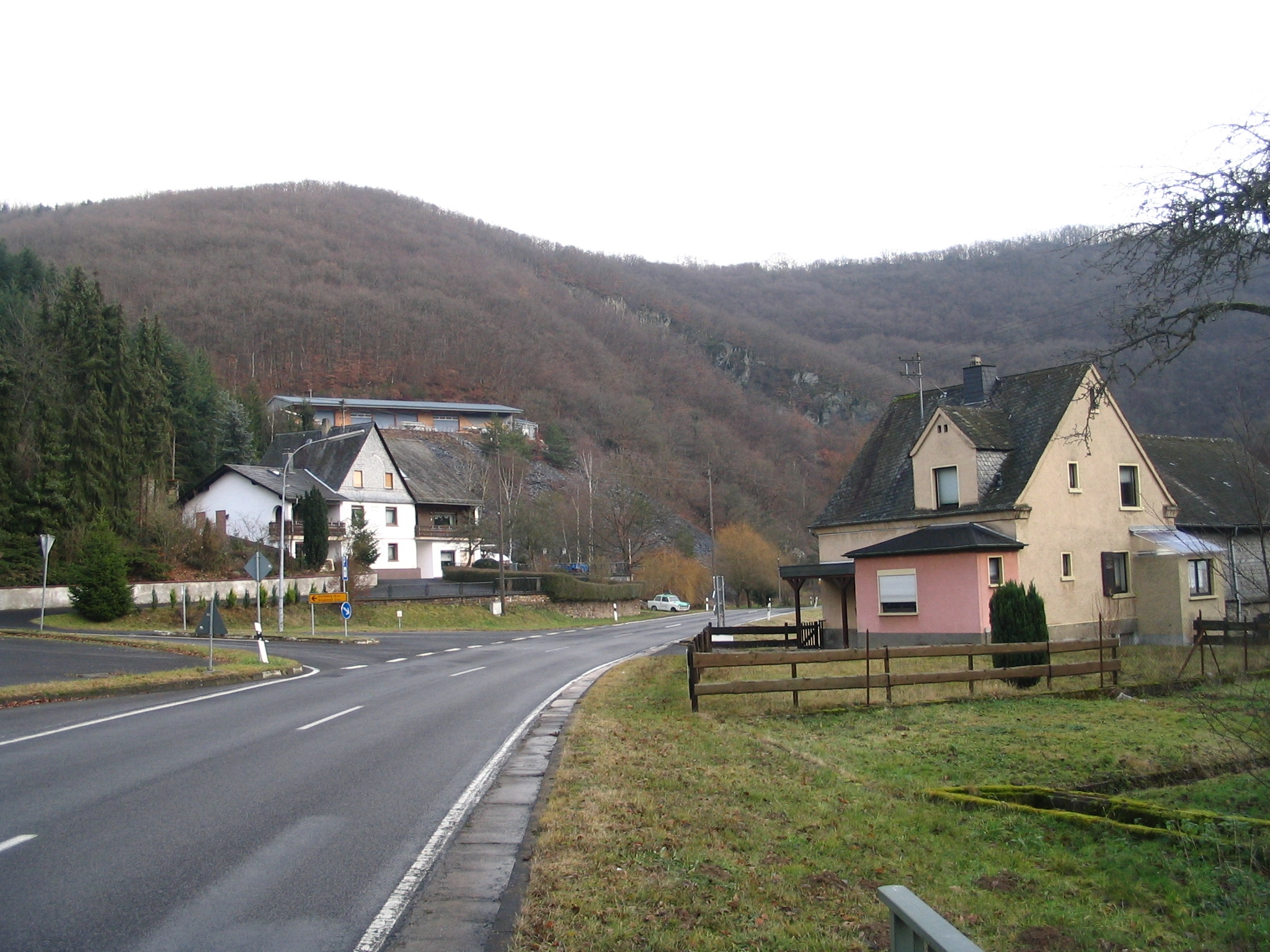
Outlying centre of Rudolfshaus

Clockwise from the north, Bruschied's neighbours are the municipalities of Schneppenbach, Woppenroth (in the Rhein-Hunsrück-Kreis), Hennweiler, Sonnschied and Bundenbach (both in the Birkenfeld district).

=== Constituent communities ===
Also belonging to Bruschied is the outlying homestead of Rudolfshaus in the Hahnenbach valley on the road between Bundenbach and Hahnenbach.

== History ==
In the Middle Ages, the village of Bruschied belonged to a great landhold of Saint Maximin's Abbey near Trier, which comprised, besides Bruschied itself, also Hausen near Rhaunen, Woppenroth, Blickersau, Kaffeld (two now vanished villages that once lay within Woppenroth's limits), Bundenbach and Schneppenbach, and was presumably subject to the Hof Hausen (the manor). Bruschied formed together with Schneppenbach a single municipal area and had its first documentary mention in 1023 under the name Prubesdervot in the directories of holdings. In 1282 it was called Probsterade and in 1426 Proistrot. Placename researchers interpret the name as meaning “clearing (—rade, —rot) laid out on a provost’s estate”. The two villages’ municipal area was at the same time in the Middle Ages a “court region”, where the Schultheiß and Schöffen (roughly “lay jurists”) exercised low jurisdiction (that is, they did not have the power to impose the death penalty) within this Ingericht. The Ingericht was itself part of the high court region of Rhaunen, which was originally under the Waldgraves’ ownership, and unlike the lower court, it could sentence wrongdoers to death. After the permanent transfer of Castle Schmidtburg to the Prince-Archbishop-Elector of Trier, Bruschied and Schneppenbach belonged, beginning in the mid 14th century to the lordship of Schmidtburg, which later formed the Amt of Schmidtburg, which itself existed until the late 18th century. The lordship over both Bruschied and Schneppenbach was held in equal shares by the Electorate of Trier and the Lords of Wiltberg. In 1563, there were ten families living in Bruschied, of whom six were subject to taxes and service demanded by the Elector and the other four were likewise subject to the Lords of Wiltberg. Ecclesiastically, Bruschied and Schneppenbach belonged to the parish of Hausen, where about 1555, the Reformation was introduced. Since the Electora-Trier Amtmann Nikolaus Schenk von Schmidtburg converted to the new belief, all the villagers in Bruschied, too, had to adopt Protestantism. After various denominational changes, back and forth, during the Thirty Years' War, the villages of Bruschied, Schneppenbach and Bundenbach ended up in the course of the Counter-Reformation becoming Catholic again. After the French Revolutionary territorial and administrative reform in 1798, Bruschied was grouped into the newly formed mairie de Kirn (mayoralty), to which it belonged until the end of the Napoleonic occupation in 1814. The village, however, remained in this municipal grouping on into Prussian times, although in 1815, it became known by the more German name Bürgermeisterei Kirn, also meaning “mayoralty”. After this entity had for a while belonged to the Simmern and Oberstein districts, Bruschied was in 1817 made part of the Bürgermeisterei of Gemünden, itself belonging to the Simmern district, which was later known as Amt, and eventually Verbandsgemeinde. In the latest round of territorial and administrative reform in Rhineland-Palatinate, the Verbandsgemeinde of Gemünden was dissolved on 8 November 1970 and Bruschied, along with the municipalities of Kellenbach, Königsau, Schneppenbach and Schwarzerden, was grouped into the Verbandsgemeinde of Kirn-Land in the Bad Kreuznach district.

=== Jewish history ===
Until 1942, there was a small Jewish population in Bruschied. It was considered an outlying part of the Jewish community in Hennweiler, as it was there that the community kept its synagogue. Its history is covered in detail in the relevant section in that article. The last four members of the Jewish community in Bruschied were deported to the camps by the Nazis in 1942.

=== Population development ===
Bruschied's population development since Napoleonic times is shown in the table below. The figures for the years from 1871 to 1987 are drawn from census data.

| Year | Inhabitants |
|---|---|
| 1815 | 286 |
| 1835 | 293 |
| 1871 | 291 |
| 1905 | 320 |
| 1939 | 286 |

| Year | Inhabitants |
|---|---|
| 1950 | 304 |
| 1961 | 301 |
| 1970 | 321 |
| 1987 | 301 |
| 2005 | 304 |

== Religion ==
Foremost among Bruschied's buildings under monumental protection is Saint Francis Xavier Catholic Church (Kirche St. Franz Xaver), built in 1892/1893 to plans drawn up by Freiburg Cathedral Master Builder Max Meckel on the site of a smaller church from the 18th century as a Gothic Revival, one-naved, plastered building with a five-eighths quire. A thorough restoration of the church's interior was undertaken in 1969/1970. Among the objects restored were several artworks from about 1700. As at 31 August 2013, there are 267 full-time residents in Bruschied, and of those, 73 are Evangelical (27.341%), 154 are Catholic (57.678%), 2 (0.749%) belong to other religious groups and 38 (14.232%) either have no religion or will not reveal their religious affiliation.

== Politics ==
=== Municipal council ===
The council is made up of 6 council members, who were elected by majority vote at the municipal election held on 7 June 2009, and the honorary mayor as chairman.

=== Mayor ===
Bruschied's mayor is Thomas Engbarth, and his deputies are Gerhard Stein and Bernd Jakobi.

=== Coat of arms ===
The German blazon reads: Unter silbernem Schildhaupt, darin ein rotes Balkenkreuz, in blauem Feld zwei gekreuzte silberne Dachdeckerhämmer, bekleidet von einer silbernen Dachplatte.

The municipality's arms might in English heraldic language be described thus: Azure two slater's hammers in saltire, between their heads a slate shingle, all argent, on a chief of the same a cross gules.

The cross on the chief is a reference to the village's former allegiance to the Electorate of Trier. The charges in the field below this, the slater's hammers and the shingle, refer to the old slate mines within Bruschied's limits. Municipal council gave the graphic artist Brust from Kirn-Sulzbach the task of designing a municipal coat of arms. At a council meeting on 11 October 1972, council adopted the design that had been put forth. After consent by the state archive, the Ministry of the Interior in Mainz granted approval for Bärenbach to bear its own arms on 27 November 1972. The arms also appear on the municipal banner.

== Culture and sightseeing ==
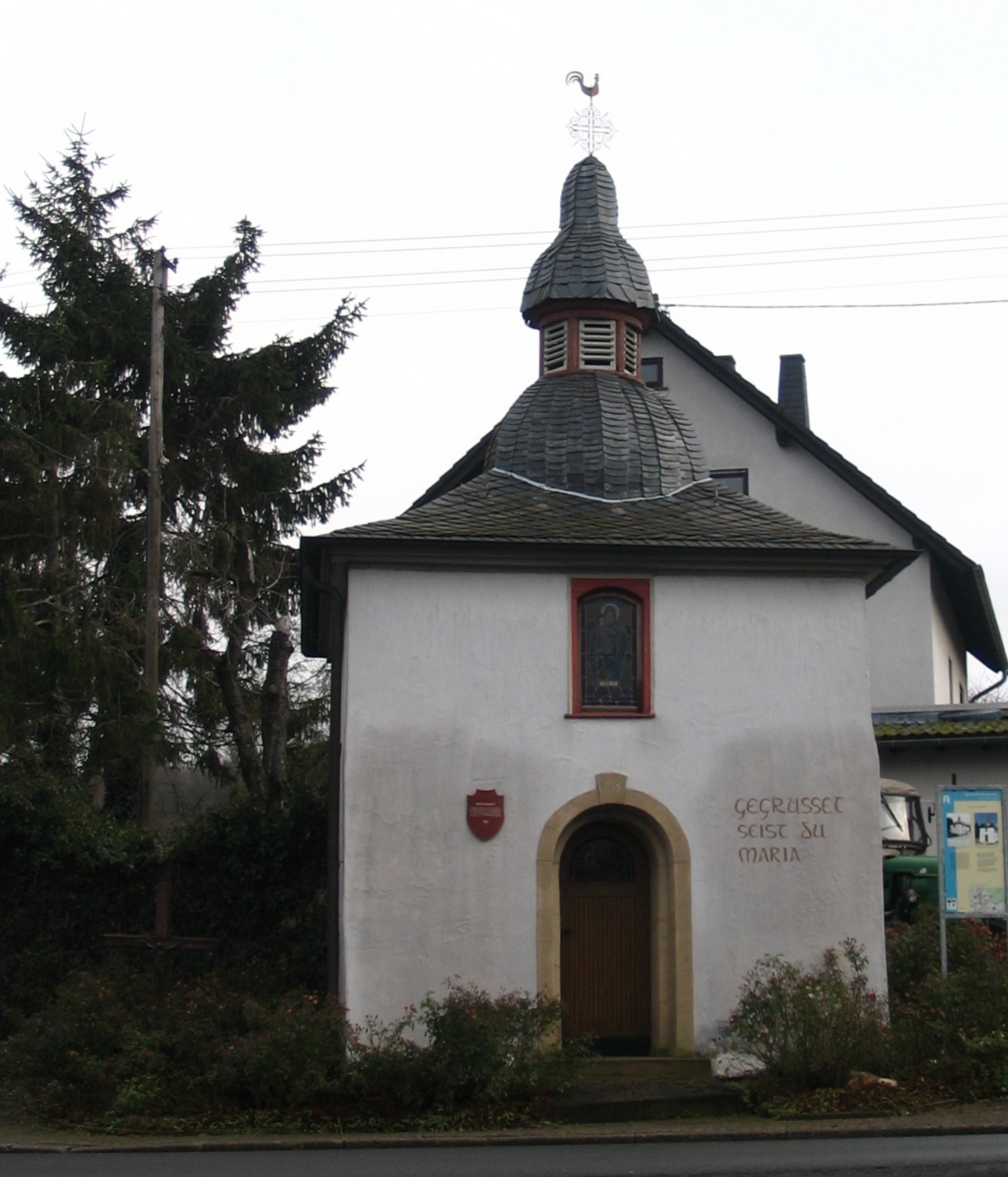
Soonwaldstraße 8 – Saint Mary's Catholic Chapel

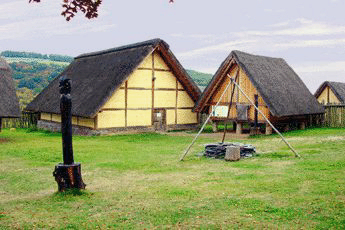
Reconstructed Celtic heights settlement of “Altburg”

=== Buildings ===
The following are listed buildings or sites in Rhineland-Palatinate’s Directory of Cultural Monuments:

- Saint Francis Xavier Catholic Church (Kirche St. Franz Xaver), Soonwaldstraße 1 – Gothic Revival aisleless church, 1892/1893, Cathedral Master Builder Max Meckel, Limburg
- Oberdorf 3 – estate complex; Baroque timber-frame house, partly solid, 18th century, timber-frame barn
- Soonwaldstraße 8 – Saint Mary’s Catholic Chapel (Marienkapelle); Baroque aisleless church, 1699; ridge turret 1854, architect Matthias Römer

Other sightseeing features in the area include:

- the Schmidtburg mediaeval castle ruin;
- the Herrenberg slate quarry (since 1976 open to visitors) and the fossil museum;
- the Celtic heights settlement, Altburg, dating from La Tène times;
- the lookout tower on the Teufelsfels (568 m), right next to the like-named, legendary quartzite butte on the Lützelsoon above the village;
- the wild, untouched Hahnenbach valley.

=== Clubs ===
The following clubs are active in Bruschied:

- Jugendgruppe “Starke Truppe” Bruschied e.V. – youth group
- Saubräter Club Bruschied e.V. – grilling club
- Spielvereinigung. Teufelsfels – united sport club
- VdK Ortsgruppe Bruschied – public service organization
