= Hahnenbach =

- Municipality
- Coat of arms

- Location of Hahnenbach within Bad Kreuznach district
- Interactive map of Hahnenbach
- Location within Germany Location within Rhineland-Palatinate
- Coordinates: 49°48′39″N 7°25′07″E
- Country: Germany
- State: Rhineland-Palatinate
- District: Bad Kreuznach
- Municipal assoc.: Kirner Land

Government
  - Mayor (2019–24): Mathias Vier

Area
  - Total: 2.79 km^{2} (1.08 sq mi)
- Elevation: 220 m (720 ft)

Population (2025-12-31)
  - Total: 533
  - Density: 191/km^{2} (495/sq mi)
- Time zone: UTC+01:00 (CET)
  - Summer (DST): UTC+02:00 (CEST)
- Postal codes: 55606
- Dialling codes: 06752
- Vehicle registration: KH

Hahnenbach is an Ortsgemeinde – a municipality belonging to a Verbandsgemeinde, a kind of collective municipality – in the Bad Kreuznach district in Rhineland-Palatinate, Germany. It belongs to the Verbandsgemeinde Kirner Land, whose seat is in the town of Kirn. Hahnenbach is a state-recognized tourism community.

== Geography ==
=== Location ===
Hahnenbach lies on the like-named brook, the Hahnenbach, which empties into the Nahe near Kirn. Hahnenbach lies northwest of Kirn right at the boundary with the neighbouring Birkenfeld district.

=== Neighbouring municipalities ===
Clockwise from the north, Hahnenbach's neighbours are the municipalities of Hennweiler and Oberhausen bei Kirn and the town of Kirn, all of which likewise lie within the Bad Kreuznach district, while the municipalities of Bergen, Griebelschied and Sonnschied all lie in the neighbouring Birkenfeld district. Hahnenbach also comes to within a few metres of the municipality of Bruschied (Bad Kreuznach district), but does not touch it.

== History ==
Like the neighbouring village of Hennweiler (formerly known as Hanenwilare), the name Hahnenbach (formerly known as Hanenbach) may go back to a common forename that cropped up in a Frankish noble clan, the Haganons. They were, beginning in the 7th century, enfeoffed and resident as members of a so-called Imperial nobility in the Rhenish Hesse area. This clan's descendants are believed to have made land arable and founded settlements in the 7th and 8th centuries when the woodlands between the Moselle and the Nahe were opened up. Many placenames therefore go back to a village's owner, founder or head from whom the original homestead, or later the village, drew its name. In the High and Late Middle Ages, Hahnenbach was held by the Lords of Stein (Steinkallenfels), that is to say, the villagers were liable to the lords of that castle for service and taxes. After Castle Wartenstein had been built by Sir Tilmann vom Stein (1357), Hahnenbach became part of the Lordship, and later Amt of Wartenstein, which was made up of the Unterämter of Hennweiler and Hahnenbach or Weiden. Belonging to the Unteramt of Hahnenbach/Weiden were the villages of Hahnenbach, Weiden and Herborn as well as parts of Niederhosenbach and Königsau. While the Amt of Hennweiler lay under Palatine Zweibrücken sovereignty, in the Amt of Hahnenbach the Prince-Archbishop-Elector of Trier was the overlord. Beginning in the 16th century, both Ämter were governed from Wartenstein by an Amtmann in personal union. After various families from the lesser nobility had exercised lordly rights in the Amt of Wartenstein beginning about 1400, in the 16th century, the Lords of Schwarzenberg became the sole lords in the Imperially immediate lordship of Wartenstein, and after they died out in 1583, the Lords of Warsberg succeeded them. This lordship persisted until French Revolutionary troops overran and occupied the German lands on the Rhine’s left bank in the late 18th century. In 1688, Castle Wartenstein was destroyed by the French during the Nine Years' War (known in Germany as the Pfälzischer Erbfolgekrieg, or War of the Palatine Succession). A new castle was then built in the years 1704-1728. During French Revolutionary, and later Napoleonic, times (1798-1814), Hahnenbach was one of 12 outlying, rural municipalities that were grouped together with the main town of Kirn to form the Mairie (“Mayoralty”) of Kirn, which in turn belonged to the Arrondissement of Simmern. After the French had been driven out and the Congress of Vienna imposed a new political order on post-Napoleonic Europe, Hahnenbach found itself in the Kingdom of Prussia, and after a short time in the Simmern district (1815-1816) and then in the Oberstein district (1816-1817), the Bürgermeisterei of Kirn, as the old French mayoralty was now called, passed on 16 April 1817 to the Kreuznach district. Hahnenbach remained a municipality within this body, which through several rounds of administrative restructuring (1817, 1858, 1894, 1927, 1940, 1969-1970) has become today's Verbandsgemeinde of Kirn-Land. In 1957, a glassworks located in Hahnenbach, which brought about a doubling in the village's population (to date). Many of the newcomers came from Thuringia.

=== Population development ===
Hahnenbach's population development since Napoleonic times is shown in the table below. The figures for the years from 1871 to 1987 are drawn from census data:

| Year | Inhabitants |
|---|---|
| 1815 | 165 |
| 1835 | 211 |
| 1871 | 201 |
| 1905 | 257 |
| 1939 | 271 |

| Year | Inhabitants |
|---|---|
| 1950 | 293 |
| 1961 | 467 |
| 1970 | 590 |
| 1987 | 634 |
| 2005 | 603 |

== Religion ==
In the 12th century, there was supposedly a chapel in Hahnenbach, and a new church was built in the 14th century. In 1775 came the first major renovation to the church. A century later, on 5 August 1875, the church was destroyed by a flood and could no longer be used. Worse still, many people died in the disaster. Most of Hahnenbach's inhabitants today are Evangelical. The Evangelical church, a six-sided Baroque Revival building, was built in 1948/1949. It belongs to the Evangelical Church in the Rhineland parish of Hennweiler-Oberhausen. Further, there is a Catholic chapel, a Baroquified aisleless church built in 1933 tended by the parish office of Saint Pancras in Kirn in the Roman Catholic Diocese of Trier. As at 30 September 2013, there are 528 full-time residents in Hahnenbach, and of those, 294 are Evangelical (55.682%), 141 are Catholic (26.705%), 1 is Greek Orthodox (0.189%), 1 is Russian Orthodox (0.189%), 8 (1.515%) belong to other religious groups and 83 (15.72%) either have no religion or will not reveal their religious affiliation.

== Politics ==
=== Municipal council ===
The council is made up of 12 council members, who were elected by majority vote at the municipal election held on 7 June 2009, and the honorary mayor as chairman.

=== Mayor ===
Hahnenbach's mayor is Mathias Vier.

=== Coat of arms ===
The German blazon reads: Schild gespalten, vorne in Schwarz ein silberner, goldgekrönter, -bewehrter und -gezungter Löwe, hinten in Gold ein blauer Hahnenkopf über einem blauen Wellenbalken.

The municipality's arms might in English heraldic language be described thus: Per pale sable a lion rampant sinister argent armed, langued and crowned Or and Or a cock's head couped at the neck above a fess wavy abased, both azure.

The charge on the dexter (armsbearer's right, viewer's left) side, the lion, is a reference to the village's former allegiance to the Lordship of Wartenstein, a fief granted by the Electorate of Trier to the Lords of Warsberg. The charges on the sinister (armsbearer's left, viewer's right) side are canting for the village's name. The word for “cock” in German is Hahn, and the wavy fess represents a brook, which is Bach in German.

Municipal council, on 30 November 1963, gave the graphic artist Brust from Kirn-Sulzbach the task of designing a municipal coat of arms. At a council meeting on 28 April 1964, council adopted the design that had been put forth. After consent by the state archive, the Ministry of the Interior in Mainz granted approval for Hahnenbach to bear its own arms on 12 May 1965. The German blazon does not mention that the lion faces sinister (heraldic left). The municipal banner also bears this coat of arms in the centre.

== Culture and sightseeing ==
=== Buildings ===
The following are listed buildings or sites in Rhineland-Palatinate’s Directory of Cultural Monuments:

- Evangelical church, Mühlenweg – Baroque Revival hexagon, quarrystone, marked 1948
- Catholic church, Mühlenweg – Baroquified aisleless church, 1933, architect Friedrich Otto
- Graveyard – Late Baroque cross, marked 1775
- Hahnenbachstraße 15 – former Stiltzmühle (mill); Late Classicist quarrystone building, about 1860/1870
- Hahnenbachstraße 34 – estate complex with timber-frame house, possibly earlier half of the 19th century
- Hennweilerstraße 7 – complex with single roof ridge; Late Baroque timber-frame building, mansard roof, possibly 18th century
- Mühlenweg – bridge across the Hahnenbach; two arches, quarrystone, possibly earlier half of the 19th century
- Mühlenweg – parish hall; quarrystone, partly slated timber framing, Heimatstil, 1939, hose-drying tower
- Bridge across the Hahnenbach, on Kreisstraße 27 – two arches, quarrystone, 19th century

=== Clubs ===
The following clubs are active in Hahnenbach:

- Angelsportverein Hahnenbach — angling club
- Förderverein der freiwilligen Feuerwehr — volunteer fire brigade promotional association
- Förderverein St. Nikolaus Kapelle — Saint Nicholas’s Chapel promotional association
- Sportförderungsverein 1990 Hahnenbach e.V. — sport promotional association
- Turnverein Hahnenbach 1961 e.V. — gymnastic club

== Economy and infrastructure ==
=== Transport ===
Running by Hahnenbach to the south is Bundesstraße 41. Serving Kirn is a railway station on the Nahe Valley Railway (Bingen–Saarbrücken).

=== Established businesses ===
- ESO Electronic Service Ottenbreit GmbH
