= Kellenbach =

- Municipality
- Coat of arms

- Location of Kellenbach within Bad Kreuznach district
- Interactive map of Kellenbach
- Location within Germany Location within Rhineland-Palatinate
- Coordinates: 49°50′51″N 07°29′42″E
- Country: Germany
- State: Rhineland-Palatinate
- District: Bad Kreuznach
- Municipal assoc.: Kirner Land

Government
  - Mayor (2019–24): Markus Römer

Area
  - Total: 8.34 km^{2} (3.22 sq mi)
- Elevation: 216 m (709 ft)

Population (2025-12-31)
  - Total: 246
  - Density: 29.5/km^{2} (76.4/sq mi)
- Time zone: UTC+01:00 (CET)
  - Summer (DST): UTC+02:00 (CEST)
- Postal codes: 55606
- Dialling codes: 06765
- Vehicle registration: KH

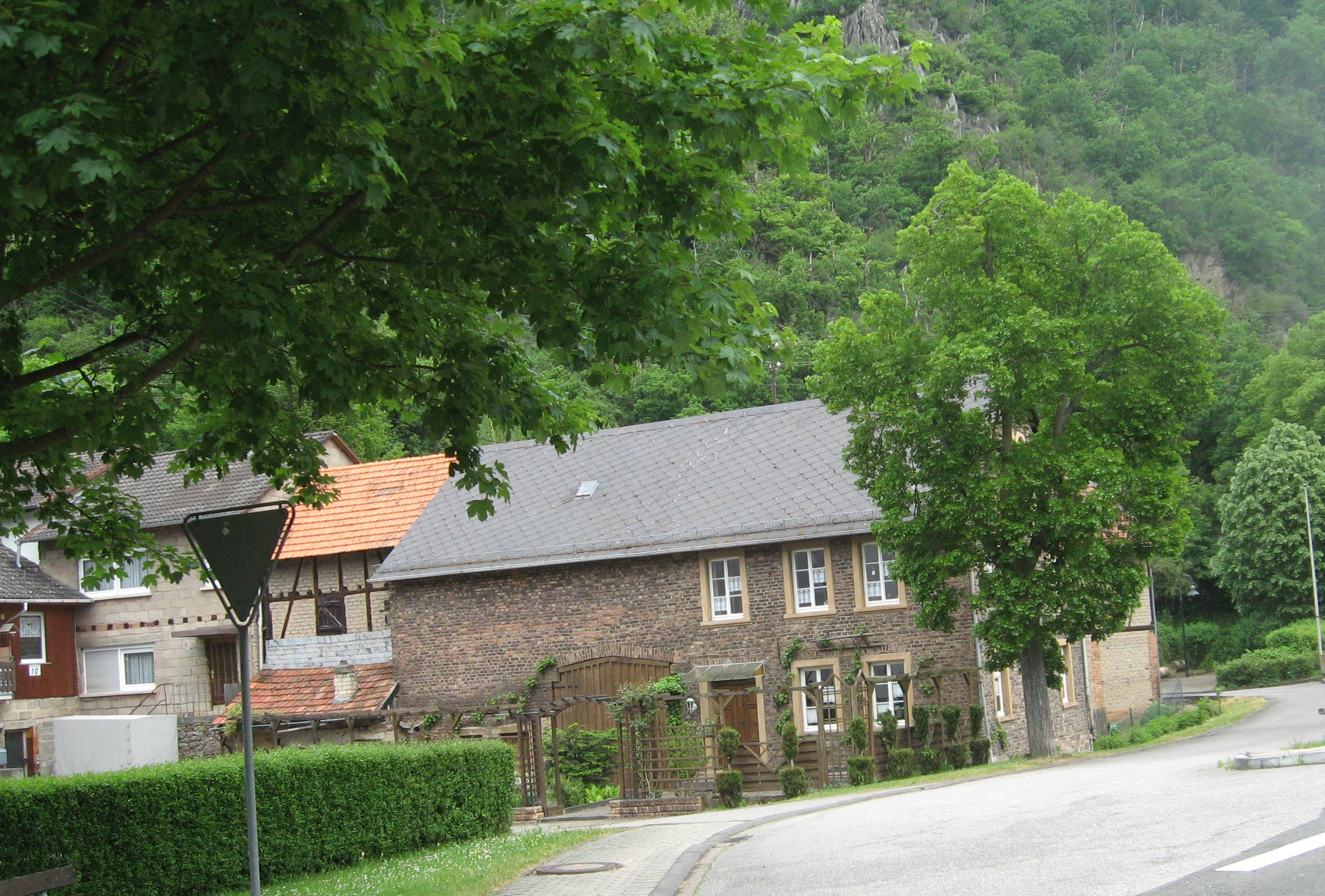
Historical building near the middle of the village

Kellenbach is an Ortsgemeinde – a municipality belonging to a Verbandsgemeinde, a kind of collective municipality – in the Bad Kreuznach district in Rhineland-Palatinate, Germany. It belongs to the Verbandsgemeinde Kirner Land, whose seat is in the town of Kirn.

== Geography ==
=== Location ===
Kellenbach lies in the southern Hunsrück at the edges of the Soonwald and Lützelsoon hills. The eponymous brook, the Kellenbach, flows through the village and empties some 8 km downstream near Simmertal into the Nahe. The greatest elevation within municipal limits, at 580 m above sea level, is the Blickenstein.

=== Neighbouring municipalities ===
Clockwise from the north, Kellenbach's neighbours are the municipalities of Königsau, Henau, Schwarzerden, Weitersborn, Simmertal, Brauweiler, Heinzenberg, Hennweiler and Schlierschied. Henau and Schlierschied both lie in the neighbouring Rhein-Hunsrück-Kreis, whereas all the others likewise lie within the Bad Kreuznach district.

=== Constituent communities ===
Also belonging to Kellenbach are the outlying homesteads of Forsthaus Lützelsoon, Gerhardsmühle and Rippas-Mühle.

== History ==
=== Antiquity ===
Sporadic prehistoric and early historic archaeological finds make it clear that there were already people living in the Kellenbach area very early on.

=== Middle Ages ===
About 1200, Kellenbach had its first documentary mention. Theoderich vom Stein built a castle house at the village and is said to have been the father of the line of the Lords of Kellenbach, a sideline of the Lords of Stein (whose seat was at Castle Steinkallenfels, which still exists, albeit as a ruin). Until the early 18th century, the village was the seat of a court and administrative region, belonging to which were also the neighbouring villages of Henau, Königsau, Schwarzerden and, for a time, Weitersborn. In the 1560 Kellenbacher Weistum (cognate with English wisdom, this was a legal pronouncement issued by men learned in law in the Middle Ages and early modern times), the Lords of Steinkallenfels and their coheirs were named as lords of the court at the Kellenbach High Court. Meanwhile, however, the landlordship and jurisdiction was divided into four lordly shares by division of inheritance, sale and enfeoffments, so that the Kellenbach High Court was a Ganerbschaft (a joint holding or inheritance), with joint high jurisdiction. A one-fourth share of the court was held by the Amt of Koppenstein. This share had been acquired by Count Simon III of Sponheim in 1403 from Johann von Treis. The other three fourths belonged to the Knights of Stein-Kallenfels, the Knights of Schmidtburg and the Lords of Kellenbach.

=== Modern times ===
Beginning in 1707, the landlord was the Margrave of Baden as heir to the Sponheim holdings. About 1750, the knightly estate, with and area of 651 Morgen (roughly 2 600 m^{2}), was sold to the former Amtmann at the neighbouring castle, Wartenstein, in the Hahnenbach valley, Franz Philipp Renauld. In the 18th century the village belonged to the Badish Oberamt of Kirchberg. After French Revolutionary troops had overrun and occupied the German lands on the Rhine’s left bank, Kellenbach, along with all the lands that the French had occupied, was absorbed into the French state. In 1794, the region was administratively reorganized according to the French Revolutionary model, putting Kellenbach in the Mairie (“Mayoralty”) of Kirn and the Arrondissement of Simmern. About 1800, there were 40 houses in Kellenbach, 4 of which had been expanded by having upper floors built onto them. The last Lord of Kellenbach died in 1798.

==== Recent times ====
Under Prussian rule beginning in 1816, Kellenbach was assigned to the Bürgermeisterei (“Mayoralty”) of Gemünden (which as of 1927 became an Amt) and thereby to the Simmern district. On 7 June 1969, in the course of the implementation of the State Law of 12 November 1968, it was, together with Königsau, Bruschied, Schneppenbach and Schwarzerden, assigned to the Bad Kreuznach district and the Verbandsgemeinde of Kirn-Land.

===== Fire at the caravan factory =====
On 9 January 1971, a great fire destroyed part of a caravan factory, a branch plant of Wilk-Caravaning GmbH, on Kellenbach's northern outskirts. The blaze was started by flying sparks in the fitter's shop, which set some nitrocellulose lacquers alight. An employee who lived on the factory lands noticed the fire in good time and notified the fire brigade. Because it was Saturday, the Kellenbach Volunteer Fire Brigade began very quickly with the job of quenching the fire, even before the Kirn, Gemünden and Pferdsfeld fire brigades could reach the fire. The blaze was thus prevented from reaching other parts of the building, which might have led to the factory's utter destruction. After the fire, the damage was reckoned to be more than 100,000 DM.

===== Icejam on the Kellenbach =====
On 22 January 1985, an icejam led to flooding of Kellenbach's main street, resulting in great damage to the buildings there. After a three-week cold spell, the river in the village core and all the way upstream towards Simmertal was thickly frozen over, but then a thaw drove huge ice floes downstream. These then got jammed just upstream from a pool in the river, piling up underneath the bridge across the brook, which was then only a few years old. According to eyewitness reports, the growing heap of ice came to within only a few centimetres of the bridge's abutment. Disagreements between various authorities as to who was responsible for dealing with the situation prevented explosives from being used to break the icejam, as residents had demanded, and as had at times also been done before. After livestock had been evacuated and sandbags had been laid on, the icejam finally broke up by itself shortly before midnight, once again allowing the water to flow freely.

=== Municipality's name ===
The name Kellenbach is believed to derive from the Old High German word kela – the Modern High German form is Kehle, meaning “channel”, “gorge” or “groove”, among other things – and it is further believed that the meaning has been transferred to mean “narrow dale”. The German word Bach means “brook”.

=== Population development ===
Kellenbach's population development since Napoleonic times is shown in the table below:

Year	Inhabitants
1815	296
1835	349
1871	319
1905	328
1939	298

Year	Inhabitants
1950	305
1961	291
1970	305
1987	266
2008	281

== Religion ==
As at 30 September 2013, there are 247 full-time residents in Kellenbach, and of those, 168 are Evangelical (68.016%), 51 are Catholic (20.648%), 2 (0.81%) belong to other religious groups and 26 (10.526%) either have no religion or will not reveal their religious affiliation.

== Politics ==
=== Municipal council ===
The council is made up of 6 council members, who were elected by majority vote at the municipal election held on 7 June 2009, and the honorary mayor as chairman.

=== Mayors ===
Listed here are Kellenbach's mayors since 1850:

- 1850–1881 Peter Föhlinger
- 1881 Peter Zerfaß
- 1881–1894 Johann Keller
- 1894–1903 Johann Fett
- 1903–1923 Peter Zerfaß
- 1923 Peter Keller
- 1923–1933 Philipp Pleines
- 1933–1940 Peter Müller
- 1940–1946 Friedrich Mühlberger
- 1946–1948 Peter Keller
- 1949–1969 Otto Zerfaß
- 1969–1994 Hans Schmelzer
- 1994–2004 Alois Lambrich
- 2004–2019 Hans-Peter Haider
- 2019– Markus Römer

=== Coat of arms ===
The German blazon reads: In geteiltem Schild oben in Rot ein schreitender, herschauender, silberner Leopard, unten in Silber über gewelltem Schildfuß drei grüne Spitzen.

The municipality's arms might in English heraldic language be described thus: Per fess gules a leopard passant guardant argent and argent issuant from a base wavy of the field three piles reversed, the middle one slightly taller and surmounting the outer two vert.

The charge in the upper field, the leopard, is drawn from the arms once borne by the Lords of Kellenbach. The three piles reversed (that is, upside down; piles in heraldry usually point down) are drawn from the old Court Seal of Kellenbach. The wavy base symbolizes the Kellenbach, after which the village is named. Municipal council gave the graphic artist Brust from Kirn-Sulzbach the task of designing a municipal coat of arms. At a council meeting on 27 August 1970, council adopted the design that had been put forth. After consent by the state archive, the Ministry of the Interior in Mainz granted approval for Kellenbach to bear its own arms on 20 January 1971. The municipal banner also bears this coat of arms in the centre.

== Culture and sightseeing ==
=== Buildings ===
The following are listed buildings or sites in Rhineland-Palatinate’s Directory of Cultural Monuments:

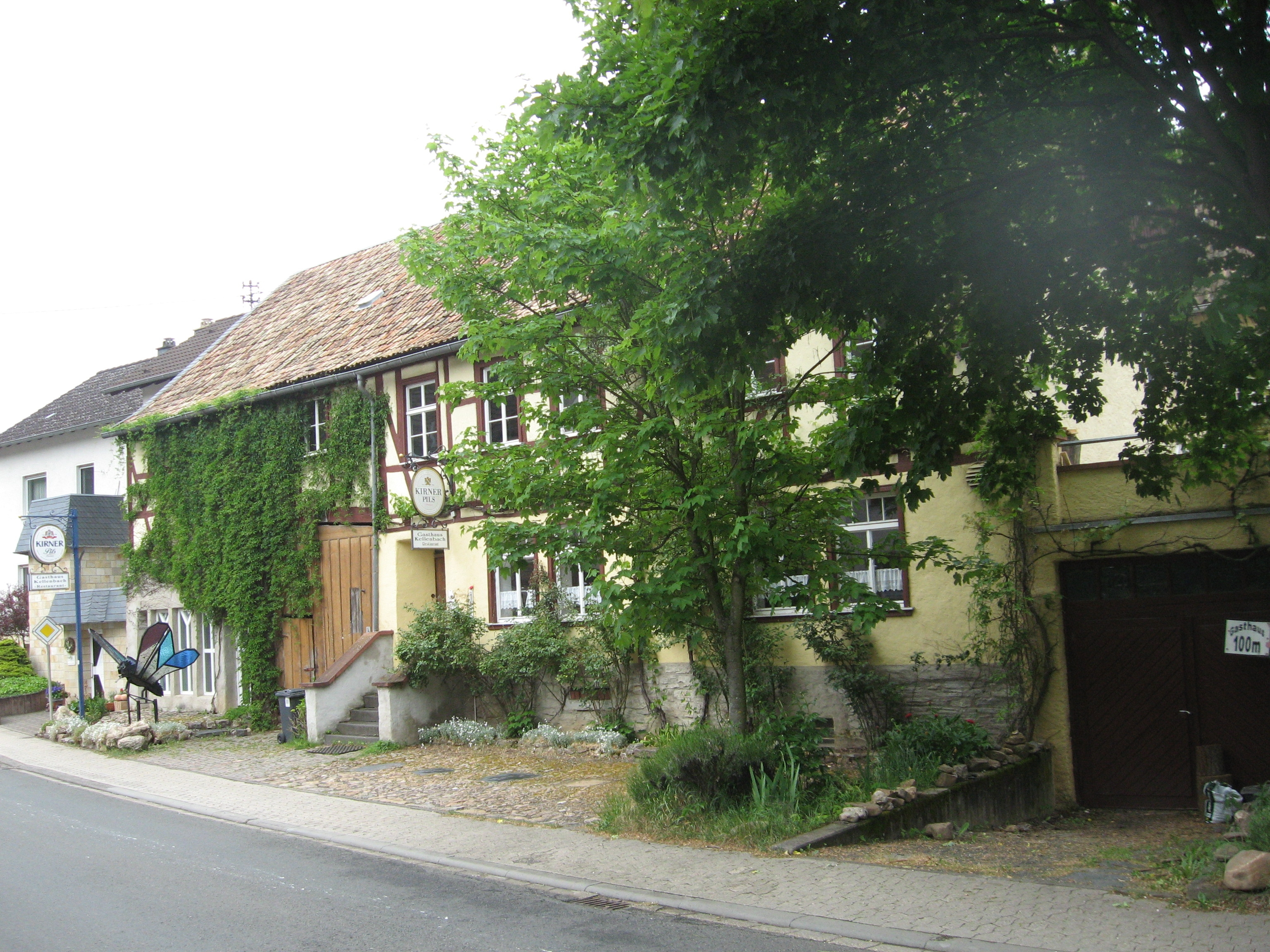
Schiefersteinstraße 14 – inn

- Evangelical parish church, Lützelsoonstraße – formerly Saint Vitus's (St. Veit), Romanesque west tower, Late Gothic quire, earlier half of the 15th century, Late Baroque aisleless church, 1765
- Saint Hildegard's Catholic Church (Kirche St. Hildegard), Schiefersteinstraße – small building with hip roof, quarrystone, Art Nouveau, 1912, architect Peter Marx, Trier
- Lützelsoonstraße – water cistern; partly timber-frame, Heimatstil, marked 1913
- Lützelsoonstraße 1 – Baroque timber-frame house, partly solid, hipped mansard roof, marked 1739; across the street a stable, partly timber-frame, 19th century
- Lützelsoonstraße 6 – former Evangelical parish barn; quarrystone, possibly from the 19th century
- Schiefersteinstraße 14 – inn; timber-frame building in the style of building with single roof ridge, marked 1868, dance hall from the 1920s
- At Schiefersteinstraße 57 – house door, Gothic Revival door leaf, marked 1883
- Rippas Mühle (mill), on the Simmerbach – one-floor building with half-hip roof, partly timber-frame, essentially possibly from the 18th century

=== More about buildings ===
Saint Hildegard's, also described as a chapel, is a branch church of the Catholic parish of Seesbach. The Evangelical church, built on somewhat higher ground, is reckoned to be one of the oldest churches in the Verbandsgemeinde. It had its first unambiguous documentary mention in 1314; however, some elements of the building, especially around the tower, suggest that the building, or at least parts of it, are about 200 years older than that. Research by the pastor H. Gramm in the 1920s yielded the knowledge that the church had originally been consecrated to Saint Vitus (or St. Veit in German). Worth seeing most of all is the organ casing, created about 1790 by Michael Engers, a student of the Family Stumm of organ builders from Schwerbach. This casing, which was converted in 1908 by F. Faust, seems quite oversized for a church of this size. The altar, too, with its rich adornment, is worth seeing. The two smaller bells come from the 13th century, while a third one weighing 450 kg was poured in 1442. A fourth bell was seized for war requirements in the First World War.

=== Graveyard ===
Next to the Evangelical church lies the graveyard for the municipalities of Kellenbach and Königsau. Formerly, the dead from Henau and Schwarzerden were also buried here, but since 1890 and 1892 respectively, these two municipalities have had their own graveyards. Buried here in 1821 was the last dweller of Castle Koppenstein, Maria Margaretha Rosenstein, known as the Koppensteiner Gretchen, but the grave's exact location is unknown today.

=== Regular events ===
Each year at Whitsun, all the local clubs together stage the village festival at the village square “Unter den Linden” in the middle of the village. In early July, the sport festival staged by the TuS Königsau-Kellenbach is held at the sporting ground. Following in mid-August is the Kellebacher Kerb, the kermis (church consecration festival), and in September, the volunteer fire brigade holds the fire brigade festival, both of which are held in or at the municipal hall. Moreover, a decades-long tradition is enjoyed by the Rosenmontagszug (Shrove Monday parade) in which the fools from Kellenbach and neighbouring Königsau go door to door in both villages reciting a speech asking for gifts (Hahnappeln). Until the 1990s, there was also a Carnival session each year on the Saturday of Carnival.

=== Clubs ===
The following clubs are active in Kellenbach:

- Angelsportverein “Forelle” Kellenbachtal e.V. — angling club
- Evangelischer Kirchenchor Kellenbach — Evangelical church choir

The church choir has existed since 1964 and collaborates several times each year on the creation of church services.

- Förderverein der Freiwilligen Feuerwehr Kellenbach — volunteer fire brigade promotional association
- Freiwillige Feuerwehr — volunteer fire brigade

The fire brigade keeps its gear and the fire engine on the ground floor at the local municipal hall. Also active is a youth fire brigade.

- Jugendclub “Stierstall” — youth club

This club, founded at the beginning of the 2000s, takes part each year in the Rosenmontagszug (Shrove Monday parade, a Carnival event) over in Gemünden. It also organizes events in Kellenbach and runs a youth room on the ground floor at the local municipal hall.

- Landfrauenverein Kellenbach — countrywomen's club
- TuS Königsau-Kellenbach e.V. — gymnastic and sport club

This club, founded in 1921, was very active in the 1980s and 1990s, foremost in the fields of football and cycling sports; over the last few years, the sporting ground with its two grass pitches has been used mostly by a paintball team.

- Förderverein Kindergarten Kellenbach — kindergarten promotional association

== Economy and infrastructure ==
=== Transport ===
Kellenbach lies on Bundesstraße 421, on which Frankfurt-Hahn Airport and the towns of Kirchberg and Simmern can be reached to the north and Bundesstraße 41 can be reached to the south.

=== Public institutions ===
From 1963 until August 1974, there was a village school in Kellenbach. Since January 1977, the old schoolhouse has been used as a kindergarten, which on the occasion of its thirtieth anniversary in 2007 was dubbed Haus der kleinen Freunde (“The Little Friends’ House”). Children who attend this kindergarten come from not only the village itself, but also from neighbouring Königsau, Weitersborn and Schwarzerden as well.

=== Established businesses ===
From 1965 until 1982, the caravan manufacturer Wilk (for a while CI Wilk, today a brand owned by Knaus Tabbert GmbH), whose head office was in Bad Kreuznach, had a branch plant on Kellenbach's northern outskirts, where for a time more than 100 workers were employed. After the plant's closure, several industries located there, the last one also being a manufacturer of recreational vehicles, but it has been insolvent since April 2009.

=== Agriculture ===
Although the village's appearance is that of a rural community, agriculture no longer plays any part in Kellenbach's economic life. In 1971, there were still 32 agricultural operations in the municipality, but by 2007, this had shrunk to three, none of which was run as anyone's main income earner.
