= Heimweiler =

- Municipality
- Coat of arms

- Location of Heimweiler within Bad Kreuznach district
- Interactive map of Heimweiler
- Location within Germany Location within Rhineland-Palatinate
- Coordinates: 49°45′18″N 7°29′36″E
- Country: Germany
- State: Rhineland-Palatinate
- District: Bad Kreuznach
- Municipal assoc.: Kirner Land
- Subdivisions: 2

Government
  - Mayor (2019–24): Andreas Setz

Area
  - Total: 9.07 km^{2} (3.50 sq mi)
- Elevation: 259 m (850 ft)

Population (2025-12-31)
  - Total: 414
  - Density: 45.6/km^{2} (118/sq mi)
- Time zone: UTC+01:00 (CET)
  - Summer (DST): UTC+02:00 (CEST)
- Postal codes: 55606
- Dialling codes: 06757
- Vehicle registration: KH

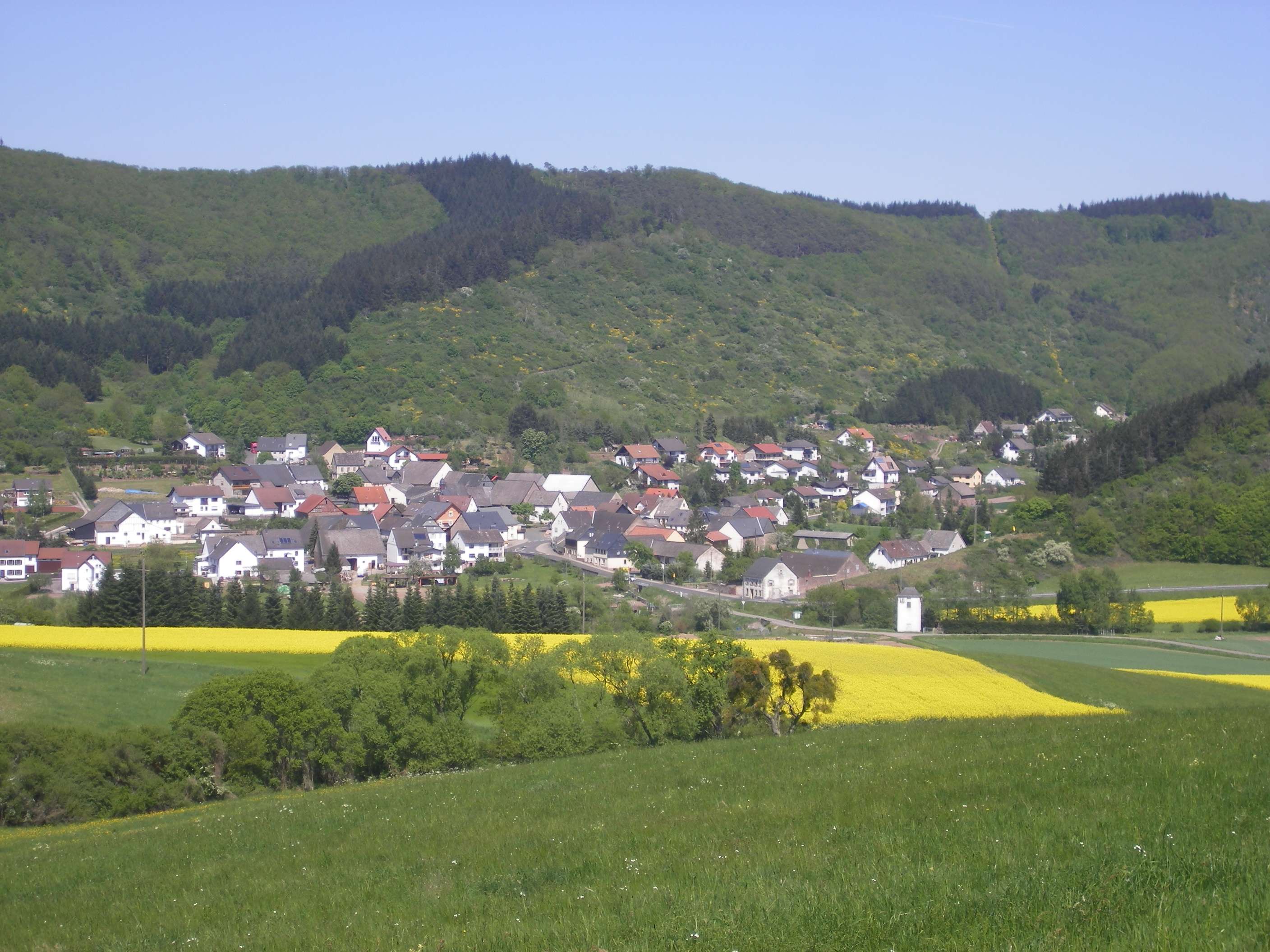
View of the constituent community of Krebsweiler

Heimweiler is an Ortsgemeinde – a municipality belonging to a Verbandsgemeinde, a kind of collective municipality – in the Bad Kreuznach district in Rhineland-Palatinate, Germany. It belongs to the Verbandsgemeinde Kirner Land, whose seat is in the town of Kirn.

== Geography ==
=== Location ===
Heimweiler lies at the edge of the North Palatine Uplands along Landesstraße 182 (Kirn–Meisenheim) and on Kreisstraße 71, which links the two centres of Heimberg and Krebsweiler together. The municipal area measures 9.07 km^{2}, and the average elevation is 259 m above sea level.

=== Neighbouring municipalities ===
Clockwise from the north, Heimweiler's neighbours are the municipalities of Meckenbach, Merxheim, Limbach, Becherbach bei Kirn, Schmidthachenbach and Bärenbach, and the town of Kirn. Schmidthachenbach lies in the neighbouring Birkenfeld district.

=== Constituent communities ===
Heimweiler's Ortsteile are Heimberg and Krebsweiler. The municipality's name is thus a portmanteau of its constituent communities’ names. Also belonging to Heimweiler are the outlying homesteads of Forsthaus Krebsweiler, Obere Horbachsmühle and Untere Horbachsmühle.

== History ==
The Ortsgemeinde of Heimweiler came into being in 1969 through the merger of the two formerly self-administering municipalities of Heimberg and Krebsweiler. Archaeological finds from the Early Roman cremation grave near Krebsweiler and the prehistoric barrow in Heimberg's outlying countryside show that there were early settlers within what are now both Heimweiler's constituent communities. Like most of the district's places, Heimberg's and Krebsweiler's foundings might have come about during the “opening up of the newer settlement area” (7th to 12th centuries). In 1375, both Krebsweiler and Heimberg had their first documentary mention as Krebeswilre and Heymberch. Both villages belonged until the late 18th century to the Amt of Naumburg. The two together formed an Ingericht (“in-court”) within the court district of Becherbach. This mediaeval jurisdictional and administrative body, which was coterminous with the parish of Becherbach, might well first have been subject to Raugravial administration, which beginning in the 14th century passed to the Counts of Sponheim-Kreuznach. After that comital house died out, the Amt of Naumburg passed to joint administration under the Electorate of the Palatinate and the Margraviate of Baden. In 1776, the Amt passed wholly to the latter. At the mediaeval Ingericht of Krebsweiler and Heimberg in the Late Middle Ages, the Lords of Heinzenberg held a share of the rights, which Tilmann von Heinzenberg sold Waldgrave Otto von Kyrburg in 1375. Economically, the villagers of Krebsweiler and Heimberg turned to Kirn, where, to support the town's market, the so-called Zollhafer (a toll in oats) still had to be paid in 1579 to the Lords of Steinkallenfels. According to a 1785 description of the Amt of Naumburg, 30 houses then stood in Krebsweiler in which all together 32 families lived. The houses were said in this description to be “small and nasty, although the village was well-off”. Krebsweiler was the main wine centre in the Amt of Naumburg, with a yearly yield of up to 40 Fuder (“tuns”; roughly 40 000 L) of wine. The nicest house, or so it was said, was the Barth’sches Haus. Heimberg counted only 16 bungalows in those days and a like number of families. The greater part of these twin villages’ population was Protestant-Reformed. After the German lands on the Rhine’s left bank were overrun and occupied by French Revolutionary troops, the subsequent new administrative order, on the French Revolutionary model, put Heimberg and Krebsweiler together in the Mairie (“Mayoralty”) of Hundsbach. After Napoleon’s downfall and the implementation of a new administrative order by the Congress of Vienna, this local administrative arrangement continued in 1815 as an Oberschultheißerei, but in the 1820s, the seat was moved back to Becherbach, which thereafter stood as the seat of the Hesse-Homburg Bürgermeisterei (“Mayoralty”) of Becherbach in the Oberamt of Meisenheim. In 1866, the Oberamt of Meisenheim passed to the Kingdom of Prussia, which in 1869 raised the Oberamt to a Prussian district. Both Heimweiler's constituent communities remained in the Amt of Becherbach, which became part of the Bad Kreuznach district in 1932, until 1940, when it was dissolved. Then, Heimberg and Krebsweiler passed to the Amt of Kirn-Land, in which they remained, each as a self-administering municipality, until 1969. After the two villages were amalgamated to form the new municipality of Heimweiler, they also found themselves grouped into a newly formed Verbandsgemeinde that also bore the name Kirn-Land.

=== Municipality’s names ===
The two names have been interpreted variously. With Heimberg, the name prefix Heim— corresponds with the name forms Heym, Heien, Hen, Hahn, Haan and so on, and goes back to the Old High German hagan ( = —hagen) in the meaning “forest” (Hag = wooded lot), and indeed Hain is still a German word that means “grove”. However, since this Frankish “opening up” of new land was characterized by new homesteads (later growing into hamlets, and villages) being given names that were tightly bound to personal or family names, it seems likelier that Heimberg can be interpreted as meaning “Hano’s Mountain” – likely a mountain that was the site of a clearing (variations in the interpretation exist, with the early settler's name as Hein, Hagen, Henn, Heinrich or even some other form, and with the last syllable as —burg rather than —berg, meaning “castle” rather than “mountain”). With the name Krebsweiler, too (appearing in a 1375 document as Krebeswilre), it seems that the name prefix Krebs— goes back to a personal name or a byname and could be interpreted as “Krebes’s (or Grebe’s, Greber’s, Krebs’s, etc.) Estate”. In the Hesse region, the Grebe was the reeve or village head, quite unlike the Modern High German meaning of Krebs, which is “crab” (the Online Etymology Dictionary declares that the Old English word gerefa, from which sprang the Modern English word “reeve”, has “no known cognates”). In the local region, the old words Heimberger or Heymbürge had the same meaning (see the German Wikipedia article “Heimbürger”).

=== Population development ===
Heimweiler's population development since Napoleonic times is shown in the table below. The figures for the years from 1871 to 1987 are drawn from census data:

Year	Inhabitants
1815	403
1835	N.A.
1871	404
1905	438
1939	366

Year	Inhabitants
1950	382
1961	399
1970	422
1987	433
2005	450

== Religion ==
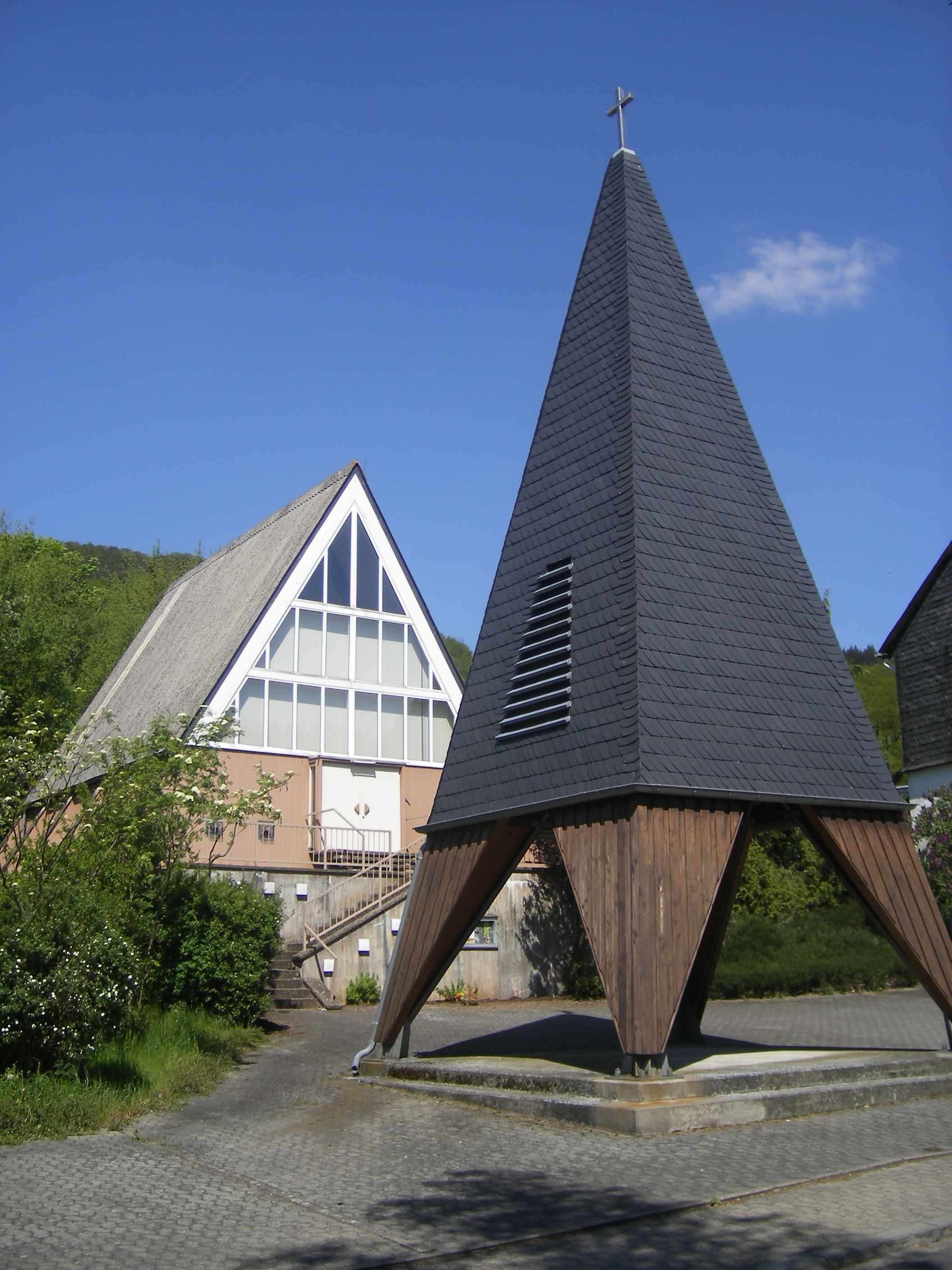
The Evangelical church with the belltower dedicated in 1996

The greater part of Heimweiler's population is Evangelical. The Evangelical church community, whose new church was consecrated in 1967, belongs to the Evangelical pastorate (Pfarramt) of Becherbach. In 1996, a belltower was added to the church, as it had never before had a bell at its disposal. The Catholic inhabitants belong to the Catholic parish of Becherbach and are tended from Kirn. As at 30 September 2013, there are 406 full-time residents in Heimweiler, and of those, 296 are Evangelical (72.906%), 57 are Catholic (14.039%), 1 (0.246%) belongs to another religious group and 52 (12.808%) either have no religion or will not reveal their religious affiliation.

== Politics ==
Heimweiler's mayor is Andreas Setz.

=== Coat of arms ===
The German blazon reads: Über blau-golden geschachtem Schildfuß in schwarz eine silberne Wasserfontäne über einem silbernen Sockel.

The municipality's arms might in English heraldic language be described thus: Per fess abased sable a fountain on a pedestal all argent, and chequy of eighteen azure and Or.

The “chequy” field is a reference to the village's former allegiance to the “Further” County of Sponheim. The fountain and pedestal symbolize the municipality's wealth of water. Heimweiler supplies water from its springs to several other nearby municipalities. The former municipalities of Krebsweiler and Heimberg each bore their own arms until they were dissolved on 7 June 1969. The council of the newly formed municipality of Heimweiler decided on 15 August 1969 to bear Krebsweiler's former arms. At a Krebsweiler council meeting on 11 April 1966, council had adopted the design that had been put forth by the graphic artist Brust from Kirn-Sulzbach. After consent by the state archive, the Ministry of the Interior in Mainz had then granted approval for Krebsweiler to bear its own arms on 1 July 1966. The approval for Heimweiler to bear these same arms was granted on 3 October 1969. The municipal banner also bears this coat of arms in the centre.

== Culture and sightseeing ==
=== Buildings ===
The following are listed buildings or sites in Rhineland-Palatinate’s Directory of Cultural Monuments:

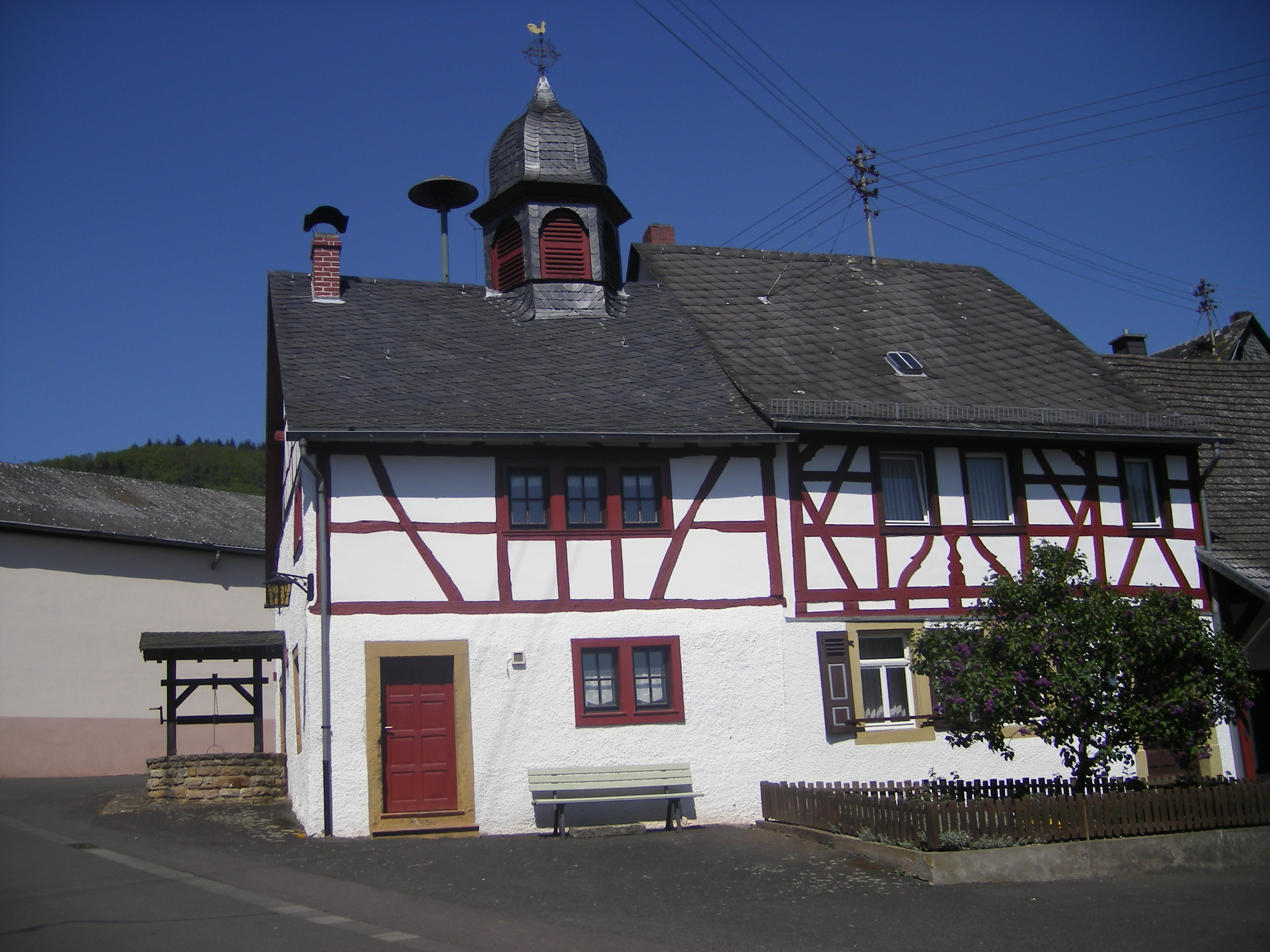
Krebsweiler, Im Oberdorf (no number) – former town hall

==== Heimberg ====
- Near Hauptstraße 81 – timber-frame house, partly slated, about 1800
- Kirchstraße, graveyard – warriors’ memorial 1914–1918, sandstone pillar, about 1925, expanded after 1945

==== Krebsweiler ====
- Hauptstraße 4 – estate complex; timber-frame house, marked 1827
- Im Oberdorf (no number) – former town hall; Baroque timber-frame building, partly solid, marked 1704
- Im Oberdorf 3 – Baroque timber-frame house, plastered and slated, mid 18th century, essentially possibly older
- Im Oberdorf 5 – timber-frame house, 18th or early 19th century
- Im Oberdorf 6 – Baroque timber-frame house, partly solid, 18th century
- Im Oberdorf 10 – Baroque timber-frame house, partly solid, gateway, 18th century
- Im Oberdorf 14 – Late Classicist house, marked 1863
- Im Oberdorf, graveyard – warriors’ memorial 1914–1918, sandstone pillar, marked 1925, sculptor Johann Nesseler Söhne, Lauterecken, expanded after 1945
- Kirner Straße 23 – hook-shaped estate; Late Baroque building with half-hip roof, timber framing plastered, latter half of the 18th century
- Kirner Straße 25 – three-sided estate; timber-frame house, plastered and slated, mid 19th century, side building marked 1881
- Obere Horbachsmühle (mill), Landesstraße 182, on the Gaßbach – building with half-hip roof and mill, partly plastered timber-frame houses, 19th century
- Untere Horbachsmühle (mill), Landesstraße 182 – three-sided estate, mid 19th century; house, partly timber-frame, mill with half-hip roof

=== Clubs ===
The following clubs are currently active in Heimweiler:

- Dorfverschönerungsverein e.V. — village beautification
- Förderverein der Freiwilligen Feuerwehr Heimweiler — volunteer fire brigade promotional association
- Jugendtreff 1976 e.V. — youth meeting
- Landfrauen Heimweiler — countrywomen's club
- MGV Krebsweiler-Heimberg 1876 e.V. — men's singing club
- TUS 1921 Heimweiler e.V. — gymnastic and sport club
  - Departments:

Athletics
Gymnastics
Hiking
Table tennis

In the late 1980s, the men's singing club was granted the title Meisterchor (“master choir”).

== Economy and infrastructure ==
=== Transport ===
Running to the west is Bundesstraße 41. Serving Kirn is a railway station on the Nahe Valley Railway (Bingen–Saarbrücken).
