= Schwarzerden =

- Municipality
- Coat of arms

- Location of Schwarzerden within Bad Kreuznach district
- Interactive map of Schwarzerden
- Location within Germany Location within Rhineland-Palatinate
- Coordinates: 49°51′43″N 07°30′47″E
- Country: Germany
- State: Rhineland-Palatinate
- District: Bad Kreuznach
- Municipal assoc.: Kirner Land

Government
  - Mayor (2019–24): Kevin Keller

Area
  - Total: 6.98 km^{2} (2.69 sq mi)
- Elevation: 450 m (1,480 ft)

Population (2025-12-31)
  - Total: 238
  - Density: 34.1/km^{2} (88.3/sq mi)
- Time zone: UTC+01:00 (CET)
  - Summer (DST): UTC+02:00 (CEST)
- Postal codes: 55629
- Dialling codes: 06765
- Vehicle registration: KH

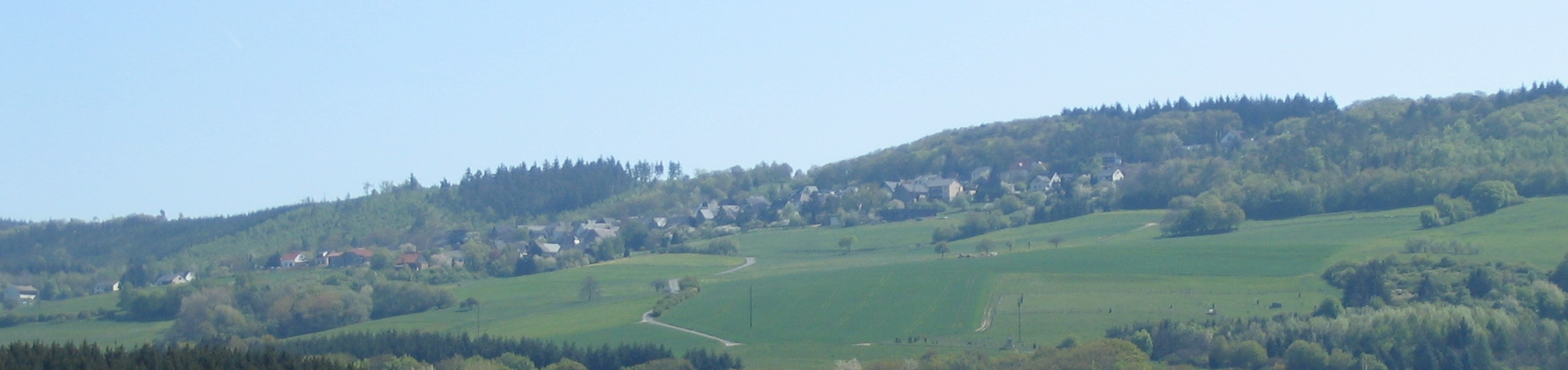
Schwarzerden at the Soonwald

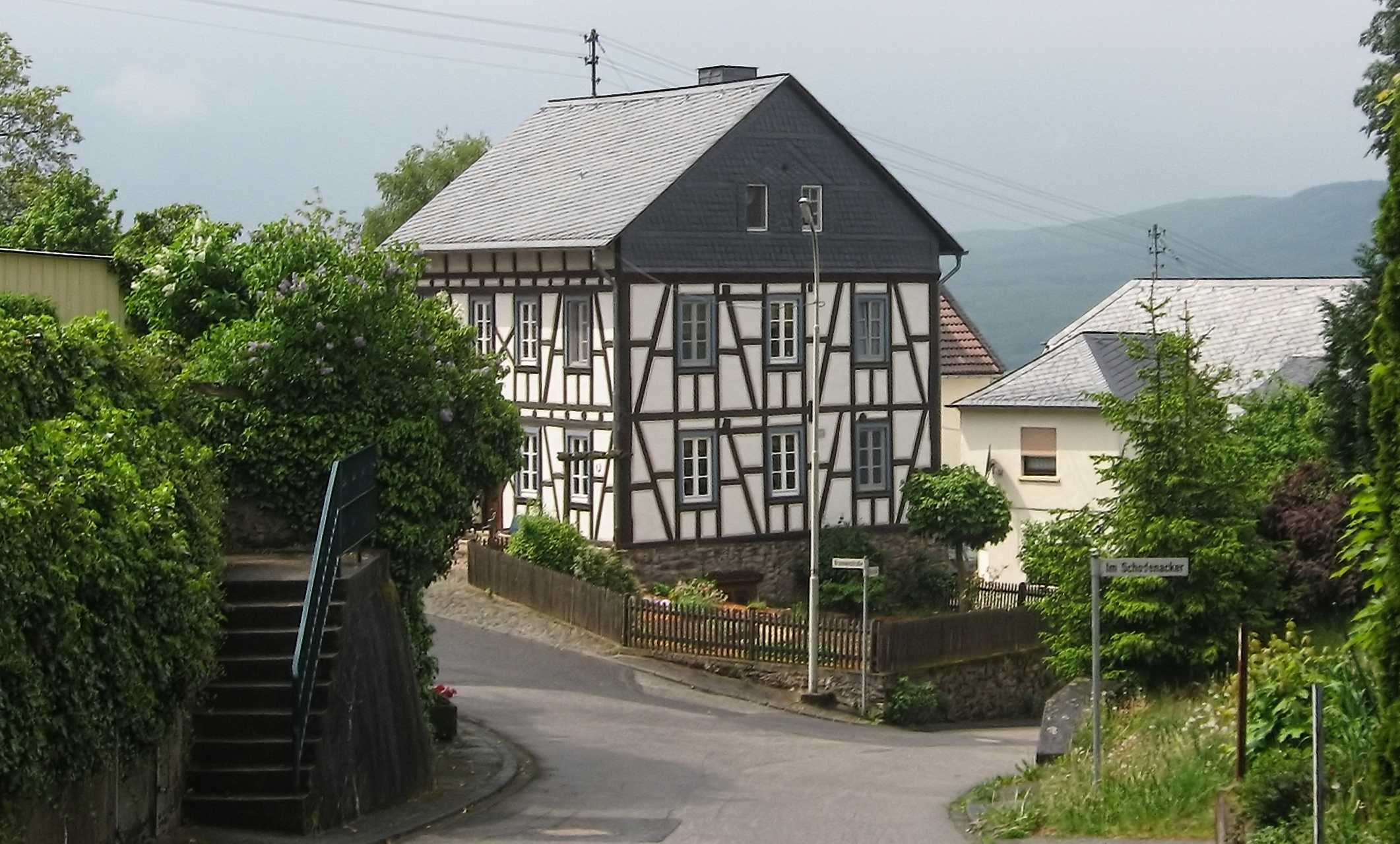
The village

Schwarzerden is an Ortsgemeinde – a municipality belonging to a Verbandsgemeinde, a kind of collective municipality – in the Bad Kreuznach district in Rhineland-Palatinate, Germany. It belongs to the Verbandsgemeinde Kirner Land, whose seat is in the town of Kirn.

== Geography ==
=== Location ===
Schwarzerden lies in the Hunsrück at an elevation of 450 m above sea level at the southern edge of the Soonwald above the Kellenbach. The municipal area is 58.6% wooded.

=== Neighbouring municipalities ===
Clockwise from the north, Schwarzerden's neighbours are the municipality of Mengerschied, the town of Bad Sobernheim (exclave, not main townsite), and the municipalities of Weitersborn, Kellenbach and Henau, all of which likewise lie within the Bad Kreuznach district except the first and last named, which lie in the neighbouring Rhein-Hunsrück-Kreis.

== History ==
Schwarzerden's name is interpreted by placename researchers as meaning a settlement area with dark-coloured, humus-rich soil, and indeed the words for “black earth” are still quite obvious in the village's name to a modern German speaker. In 1325, Schwarzerden had its first documentary mention when Prince-Archbishop-Elector of Trier Baldwin of Luxembourg acquired rights and landholds at the village from the knight Sir Friedrich of Steinkallenfels. Mentioned in 1334 was a forest with the name Schwartzerdyn that was “propre castrum Coppenstein” (near Castle Koppenstein, now a ruin outside neighbouring Henau) that the Prince-Archbishop-Elector also chose to buy. In 1355, the knight Sir Tilmann vom Stein (Wartenstein) was enfeoffed with this landhold. The Trier landholds were in the time that followed granted to families of the lower nobility as mesne fiefs. Named as feudal lords were the Family von Rüdesheim (1439) and the Family von der Leyen (1543). Furthermore, the Knights of Schmidtburg (1517) and the Vögte of Hunolstein (1555) were furnished with rights and landholds in Schwarzerden. During the Middle Ages, the village belonged to the High Court of Kellenbach, which also comprised the villages of Kellenbach, Henau and Königsau. The Lords of Steinkallenfels and their coheirs might originally have been the only court lords in this judicial zone. Through division of inheritance, sale and enfeoffments, though, the court lordship was later shared by several local lords, making the High Court of Kellenbach a condominium under joint high-court jurisdiction. In 1601, there were 14 hearths (for which read “households”) in Schwarzerden, which would have made the number of inhabitants roughly 60 or 70. By 1579, the Schwarzerden villagers were still having to pay two Simmer in “toll oats” (Zollhafer) to the Lords of Steinkallenfels for using the market at Kirn. Clear from this on the one hand is an older dependence on the Steinkallenfelses, and on the other hand a certain economic tendency on the villagers’ part towards Kirn. In 1702, there were eleven families living in Schwarzerden who were subjects of the Counts of Sponheim. In 1766, there were all together 44 households who were all subject to the sovereignty of the Margrave of Baden, who was now the rightful heir to the Sponheim comital family's territory. In the course of French Revolutionary administrative restructuring about 1800, the village was assigned to the then newly founded Mairie (“Mayoralty”) of Monzingen in the Canton of Sobernheim and the Arrondissement of Simmern. After French rule ended in the German lands on the Rhine’s left bank, Schwarzerden passed in 1816 to the Bürgermeisterei (“Mayoralty”) of Gemünden in the Prussian district of Simmern, where it remained until the latest administrative restructuring in Rhineland-Palatinate. Since 8 November 1970, Schwarzerden has been part of the Verbandsgemeinde of Kirn-Land.

=== Population development ===
Schwarzerden's population development since Napoleonic times is shown in the table below. The figures for the years from 1871 to 1987 are drawn from census data:

Year	Inhabitants
1815	246
1835	388
1871	315
1905	286
1939	306

Year	Inhabitants
1950	343
1961	338
1970	341
1987	293
2005	262

== Religion ==
As at 31 January 2014, there are 243 full-time residents in Schwarzerden, and of those, 155 are Evangelical (63.786%), 46 are Catholic (18.93%), 1 is Greek Orthodox (0.412%), 2 are Russian Orthodox (0.823%), 3 (1.235%) belong to other religious groups and 36 (14.815%) either have no religion or will not reveal their religious affiliation.

== Politics ==
=== Municipal council ===
The council is made up of 6 council members, who were elected by majority vote at the municipal election held on 7 June 2009, and the honorary mayor as chairwoman.

=== Mayor ===
Schwarzerden's mayor is Kevin Keller.

=== Coat of arms ===
The German blazon reads: In gespaltenem Schild, vorne blau-golden geschacht, hinten in Rot ein silberner Burgturm.

The municipality's arms might in English heraldic language be described thus: Per pale countercompony of azure and Or and gules a tower argent.

The countercompony (that is, with two chequered bands) pattern on the dexter (armsbearer's right, viewer's left) side is a reference to the village's former allegiance to the Counts of Sponheim, Amt of Koppenstein. The castle tower on the sinister (armsbearer's left, viewer's right) side shows the Alteburg in the tinctures borne by the Lords of Steinkallenfels (High Court of Kellenbach), to whom the village formerly belonged. Municipal council, on 15 May 1972, gave the graphic artist Brust from Kirn-Sulzbach the task of designing a municipal coat of arms. At a council meeting on 17 November 1972, council adopted the design that had been put forth. After consent by the state archive, the Ministry of the Interior in Mainz granted approval for Schwarzerden to bear its own arms on 17 January 1973. The municipal banner also bears this coat of arms in the centre.

== Culture and sightseeing ==
=== Buildings ===
The following are listed buildings or sites in Rhineland-Palatinate’s Directory of Cultural Monuments:

- Brunnenstraße 10 – timber-frame house with knee wall on high quarrystone pedestal, from the earlier half of the 19th century

==== Ringwall ====
Northeast of Schwarzerden are found remnants of the Celtic ringwall called the Alteburg (“Old Castle”). A lookout tower there affords visitors a broad, panoramic view.

=== Clubs ===
The following clubs are active in Schwarzerden:

- FCK Fanclub — 1. FC Kaiserslautern fan club
- Förderverein der freiwilligen Feuerwehr Schwarzerden — fire brigade promotional association
- Freiwillige Feuerwehr Schwarzerden — volunteer fire brigade
- FSV Schwarzerden e.V. — football and sport club
- Gemischter Chor Schwarzerden — mixed choir
- Kultur- und Verschönerungsverein — cultural and beautification club
- Landfrauenverein Schwarzerden — countrywomen's club
- Sportschaugucker-Club — sport spectator club
- Volksbildungswerk Schwarzerden — “people’s education”

== Economy and infrastructure ==
=== Transport ===
Running through Schwarzerden is Kreisstraße 15, locally known as Hauptstraße (“Main Street”). This leads north to Landesstraße 229 and south to Landesstraße 230, which leads to Simmertal, where there is a junction between Bundesstraßen 41 and 421. Serving nearby Martinstein, just east of Simmertal, is a railway station on the Nahe Valley Railway (Bingen–Saarbrücken).
