= Spall (disambiguation) =

Spall are fragments of a material that are broken off a larger solid body.

Spall may also refer to:

- Spall, Germany, a municipality

== People with the surname ==
- Rafe Spall (born 1983), English actor
- Robert Spall (1890–1918), Canadian recipient of the Victoria Cross
- Timothy Spall (born 1957), English actor
