= Brauweiler, Rhineland-Palatinate =

Brauweiler
- Municipality
- Coat of arms

- Location of Brauweiler within Bad Kreuznach district
- Interactive map of Brauweiler
- Location within Germany Location within Rhineland-Palatinate
- Coordinates: 49°49′27″N 7°29′56″E
- Country: Germany
- State: Rhineland-Palatinate
- District: Bad Kreuznach
- Municipal assoc.: Kirner Land

Government
  - Mayor (2019–24): Karl-Jürgen Barth

Area
  - Total: 3.16 km^{2} (1.22 sq mi)
- Elevation: 323 m (1,060 ft)

Population (2025-12-31)
  - Total: 61
  - Density: 19/km^{2} (50/sq mi)
- Time zone: UTC+01:00 (CET)
  - Summer (DST): UTC+02:00 (CEST)
- Postal codes: 55606
- Dialling codes: 06754
- Vehicle registration: KH

Brauweiler is an Ortsgemeinde – a municipality belonging to a Verbandsgemeinde, a kind of collective municipality – in the Bad Kreuznach district in Rhineland-Palatinate, Germany. It belongs to the Verbandsgemeinde Kirner Land, whose seat is in the town of Kirn.

== Geography ==
=== Location ===
Brauweiler lies in the southern Hunsrück at an elevation of 323 m above sea level in the western Soonwald foothills above the Kellenbach and the municipality of Simmertal.

=== Neighbouring municipalities ===
Clockwise from the north, Brauweiler's neighbours are the municipality of Kellenbach, the municipality of Simmertal, the municipality of Horbach, the municipality of Simmertal (again), the municipality of Hochstetten-Dhaun and the municipality of Heinzenberg. Brauweiler's municipal area comes within several metres of Hennweiler’s, but does not actually border on it, while Simmertal’s crescent-shaped municipal area means that it borders on Brauweiler’s in two places, one each side of Horbach.

== History ==
Many prehistoric archaeological finds from various epochs bear witness to very early settlers within what are now Brauweiler’s municipal limits. The oldest finds come from the New Stone Age (3500-1800 BC). The village originally belonged to the greater municipal area of Simmern under Dhaun, a lordly estate held by Saint Maximin’s Abbey, an Imperial monastery, and in which the Waldgraves of Dhaun exercised Vogtei rights. In the Late Middle Ages, Brauweiler was subject to the Sponheim lordship of Koppenstein. The village’s boundary alignment within the Amt of Koppenstein often led to disagreements with the Waldgraves and Rhinegraves, who had their seat at Dhaun, because territorial and judicial rights were not altogether clearly defined. The Rhinegraves’ position, for instance, was that the Brauweiler municipality outside its estate fences had neither its own municipal area nor any rights, but rather that it should be used together, for its water and grazing, with the inhabitants of Simmern. The Waldgrave and Rhinegrave of Dhaun also claimed fishing, hunting and forestry rights there. All this was argued at the Palatine arbitration tribunal, and it ruled that these rights belonged to the Counts of Sponheim. Brauweiler remained until the end of feudal times a part of the Amt of Koppenstein, which was subject to the Badish Oberamt of Kirchberg. Ecclesiastically, Brauweiler was always subject to the parish of Simmern and Dhaun. After the German lands on the Rhine’s left bank were occupied by French Revolutionary troops and administrative reform on the French Revolutionary model had been begun in 1798, Brauweiler was assigned to the Mairie (“Mayoralty”) of Monzingen. In the time that followed, Monzingen remained Brauweiler's Amt seat. Since the Amt was dissolved in 1970, however, Brauweiler has been part of the Verbandsgemeinde of Kirn-Land.

=== Municipality’s name ===
The municipality's name appeared in 1380 as Pruwilre and goes back to the base form Brunen-wilre, which can be interpreted as meaning “Bruno’s Estate”.

== Religion ==
As of 2013, there were 74 full-time residents in Brauweiler, and of those, 50 were Evangelical (67.568%), 8 were Catholic (10.811%) and 16 (21.622%) either had no religion or did not reveal their religious affiliation.

== Politics ==
=== Town council ===
The council is made up of 6 council members, who were elected by majority vote at the municipal election held on 7 June 2009, and the honorary mayor as chairman.

=== Mayor ===
Brauweiler's mayor is Karl-Jürgen Barth, and his deputy is Manfried Schacht.

=== Coat of arms ===
The German blazon reads: Schild geteilt, oben in Schwarz eine goldene Gewandfibel, unten blau-golden geschacht.

The municipality's arms might in English heraldic language be described thus: Per fess enhanced sable a clothing fibula Or and chequy of twelve azure and Or.

The charge in the upper field is a clothing fibula that was unearthed in 1936 during digging work within Brauweiler's limits. It comes from La Tène times and is made in the shape of a snake's body with a bird's head. The original piece is now kept at the Romano-Germanic Central Museum in Mainz. The “chequy” pattern below this is a reference to the village's former allegiance to the “Further” County of Sponheim. Municipal council gave the graphic artist Brust from Kirn-Sulzbach the task of designing a municipal coat of arms. At a council meeting on 12 August 1977, council adopted the design that had been put forth. After consent by the state archive, the Ministry of the Interior in Mainz granted approval for Brauweiler to bear its own arms on 7 December 1977. The arms also appear on the municipal banner.

== Culture and sightseeing ==
=== Buildings ===
The following are listed buildings or sites in Rhineland-Palatinate’s Directory of Cultural Monuments:

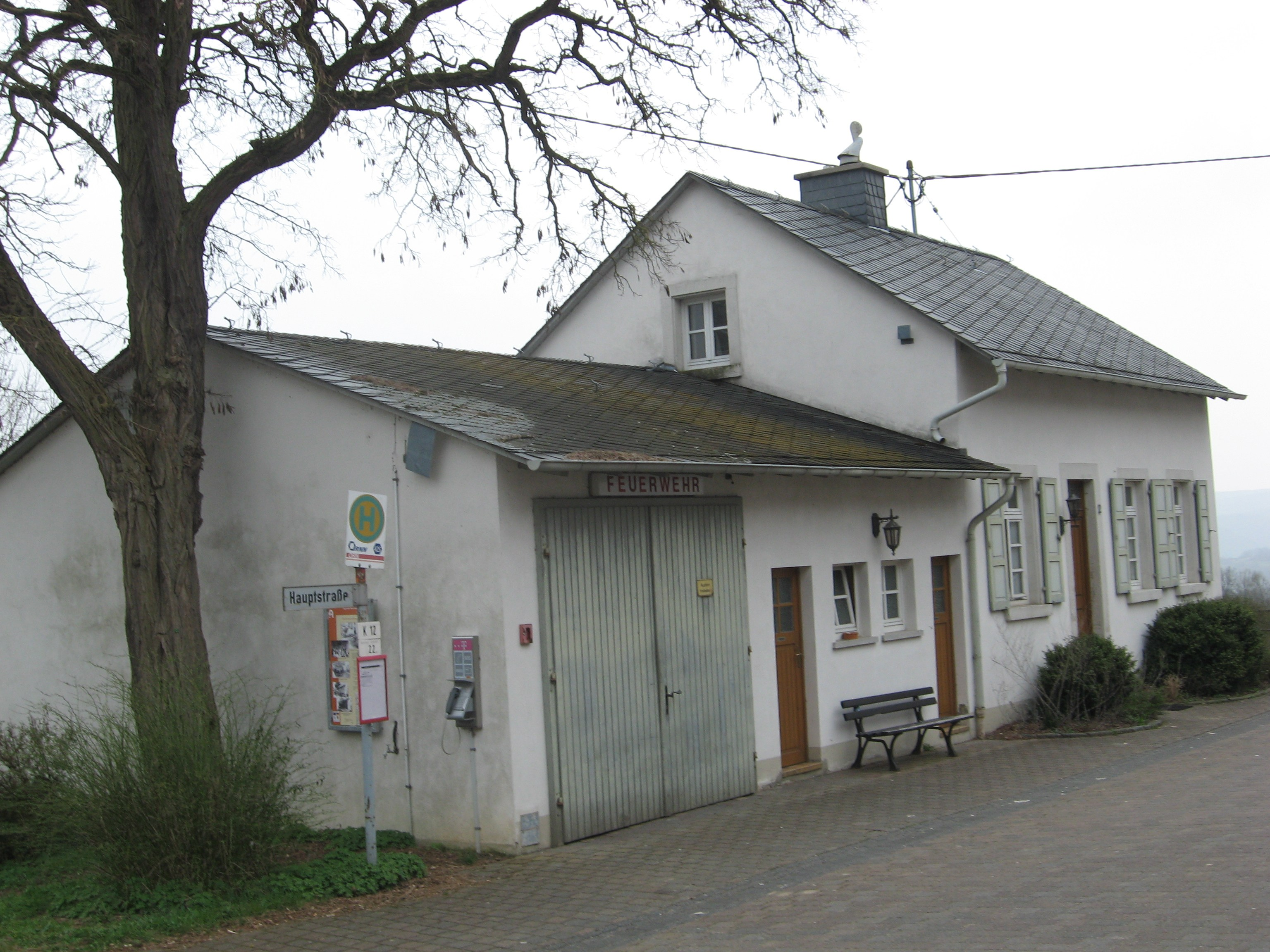
Hauptstraße 2 – former school

- Hauptstraße 2 – former school, one-and-a-half-floor plastered building, 1864

=== Clubs ===
Brauweiler has a local history and cultural club (Heimat- und Kulturverein Brauweiler e.V.).

== Economy and infrastructure ==
=== Transport ===
Brauweiler lies off the main road and can only be reached over a winding access road that branches off Bundesstraße 421. Running by the village farther to the south is Bundesstraße 41. Serving nearby Martinstein is a railway station on the Nahe Valley Railway (Bingen–Saarbrücken).
