= Oberhausen bei Kirn =

- Municipality
- Coat of arms

- Location of Oberhausen bei Kirn within Bad Kreuznach district
- Interactive map of Oberhausen bei Kirn
- Location within Germany Location within Rhineland-Palatinate
- Coordinates: 49°48′31″N 07°27′02″E
- Country: Germany
- State: Rhineland-Palatinate
- District: Bad Kreuznach
- Municipal assoc.: Kirner Land

Government
  - Mayor (2019–24): Thomas Jung

Area
  - Total: 4.58 km^{2} (1.77 sq mi)
- Elevation: 400 m (1,300 ft)

Population (2025-12-31)
  - Total: 887
  - Density: 194/km^{2} (502/sq mi)
- Time zone: UTC+01:00 (CET)
  - Summer (DST): UTC+02:00 (CEST)
- Postal codes: 55606
- Dialling codes: 06752
- Vehicle registration: KH

Oberhausen bei Kirn is an Ortsgemeinde – a municipality belonging to a Verbandsgemeinde, a kind of collective municipality – in the Bad Kreuznach district in Rhineland-Palatinate, Germany. It belongs to the Verbandsgemeinde Kirner Land, whose seat is in the town of Kirn. Oberhausen bei Kirn is one of two municipalities in the district with the name Oberhausen. The other is Oberhausen an der Nahe.

== Geography ==
=== Location ===
Oberhausen bei Kirn lies on a high plateau at the edge of the Lützelsoon above Kirn on the River Nahe.

=== Neighbouring municipalities ===
Clockwise from the north, Oberhausen bei Kirn's neighbours are the municipalities of Hennweiler, Heinzenberg and Hochstetten-Dhaun, the town of Kirn and the municipality of Hahnenbach, all of which likewise lie within the Bad Kreuznach district.

=== Constituent communities ===
Also belonging to Oberhausen bei Kirn are the outlying homesteads of Itzebacherhof, Königshof and Schloss Wartenstein.

== History ==
The land that is now Oberhausen's municipal area was settled very early on. A few archaeological finds at barrows of the so-called "Old Hunsrück-Eifel Culture", for instance a bronze torc and bronze armrings, are traces of human habitation from the time between 600 and 400 BC. Leading across what is now the municipal area were two important prehistoric roads, of which the so-called Salzstraße ("Salt Road") linked the upper Nahe region with the Rhine and the other, a road from Kirchberg to Meisenheim, served as a north–south link between the Moselle region and the North Palatine Uplands. Oberhausen's first documentary mentions are found in documents from 1342 (Obernhusen) and 1346. The latter is a Weistum (cognate with English wisdom, this was a legal pronouncement issued by men learned in law in the Middle Ages and early modern times) in which the court Schöffe (roughly "lay jurist") "Hermann von Obirnhusen" is named as a member of the Hennweiler court's council of Schöffen. Oberhausen then belonged to the Vogtei of Heinzenberg, a mediaeval jurisdictional and administrative region formed of the villages of Hennweiler, Oberhausen, Guntzelnberg, Rode and Heinzenberg and the Eigener Hof (an estate). Here, the Lords of Heinzenberg, who lived at a castle in the Kellenbach valley, were responsible as Vögte for giving the law and for raising tax revenue. Hennweiler was the "mother village" in this greater municipal area, whereas Oberhausen was, like all the other outlying villages, a "daughter village" or an "expansion settlement". The Vogtei region was also a parochial region whose mother church was Saint Stephen's (Stephanuskirche) in Hennweiler. In the Late Middle Ages, Oberhausen became part of the Lordship of Wartenstein and belonged to the Unteramt of Hennweiler. It was then that power passed from the Lords of Heinzenberg, first to Tilmann vom Stein (or Wartenstein), but he died without having fathered any male offspring, and his power eventually passed over time, by marriage into other families of the lower nobility, to other lines. These families who had acquired Tilmann's holdings and rights in the Lordship of Wartenstein, formed a kind of Ganerbengemeinschaft, a form of condominium, whereby they ruled jointly. In the course of the earlier half of the 16th century, the Lords of Schwarzenberg eventually managed to secure their place as the sole lordship in the Unteramt of Hennweiler, although they had to be mindful that their overlords were still the Counts Palatine of Zweibrücken (later Dukes of Palatinate-Zweibrücken), who were rightful successors to the Counts of Veldenz. As the village lord, Johann III of Schwarzenberg introduced the Reformation into the parish of Hennweiler/Oberhausen sometime about 1550. Oberhausen formed together with Hennweiler a greater municipal area in the Late Middle Ages that was run as a Markgenossenschaft – a combined municipality with one administration and a single body of law. It was only later that the municipal area was split between the two villages. The villages' common woodlands were shared out as late as 1769. Beginning in 1798, Oberhausen lay under French rule, as did all the German lands on the Rhine's left bank. This lasted until the Napoleonic French were driven out in 1814. During this time, Oberhausen belonged to the Mairie ("Mayoralty") of Kirn in the Arrondissement of Simmern. After the Congress of Vienna had grouped the village into the Kingdom of Prussia, Oberhausen remained with the same mayoralty, although the German word Bürgermeisterei was now used for it. After Kirn was granted town rights in 1857, though, it together with the outlying villages formed a municipal body known as the Landbürgermeisterei Kirn, which was headed by the mayor of Kirn. This "personal union" was dissolved in 1896, whereupon representatives of the rural villages chose their own Bürgermeister (mayor). Ever since, Oberhausen has remained in this municipal league of "Kirn-Land" without interruption, although in the course of administrative restructuring in Rhineland-Palatinate, it ceased to be an Amt in 1969 and became instead the Verbandsgemeinde of Kirn-Land. Over the last few decades, Oberhausen has grown from a mainly agriculturally orientated village into a modern residential community. Since 1953/1954, water has been supplied to the village by the Gruppenwasserwerk Krebsweiler ("Krebsweiler Group Waterworks"). Sewerage was laid between 1956 and 1963, and carries sewage to the treatment plant at Kirn.

=== Population development ===
Oberhausen bei Kirn's population development since Napoleonic times is shown in the table below. The figures for the years from 1871 to 1987 are drawn from census data:

| Year | Inhabitants |
|---|---|
| 1815 | 312 |
| 1835 | 362 |
| 1871 | 407 |
| 1905 | 574 |
| 1939 | 568 |

| Year | Inhabitants |
|---|---|
| 1950 | 629 |
| 1961 | 705 |
| 1970 | 855 |
| 1987 | 908 |
| 2005 | 1,011 |

== Religion ==
As at 30 November 2013, there are 917 full-time residents in Oberhausen bei Kirn, and of those, 458 are Evangelical (49.945%), 346 are Catholic (37.732%), 1 is Russian Orthodox (0.109%), 5 (0.545%) belong to other religious groups and 107 (11.668%) either have no religion or will not reveal their religious affiliation.

== Politics ==
=== Municipal council ===
The council is made up of 12 council members, who were elected by proportional representation at the municipal election held on 7 June 2009, and the honorary mayor as chairman. The municipal election held on 7 June 2009 yielded the following results:

| Year | SPD | CDU | FWG | Total |
|---|---|---|---|---|
| 2009 | 5 | 2 | 5 | 12 seats |
| 2004 | 5 | 4 | 7 | 16 seats |

=== Mayor ===
Oberhausen bei Kirn's mayor is Thomas Jung.

=== Coat of arms ===
The German blazon reads: In gespaltenem Schild vorn in Schwarz ein silberner, goldgekrönter, -bewehrter und -gezungter Löwe, hinten in Gold ein roter Sparren, darunter ein roter gelappter Wendelring.

The municipality's arms might in English heraldic language be described thus: Per pale sable a lion rampant sinister argent armed, langued and crowned Or and Or a chevron in chief under which a lobed torc, both gules.

The charge on the dexter (armsbearer's right, viewer's left) side, the lion, is a reference to the village's former allegiance to the Lords of Wartenstein. Meanwhile, on the sinister (armsbearer's left, viewer's right) side, the chevron is, in a manner of speaking, a canting charge, suggesting as it does a "house", which in turn suggests the placename ending —hausen ("house" is Haus in German). The torc is an archaeological find from Hallstatt times unearthed from a grave in Oberhausen. Municipal council, on 29 November 1963, gave the graphic artist Brust from Kirn-Sulzbach the task of designing a municipal coat of arms. At a council meeting on 24 September 1965, council adopted the design that had been put forth. After consent by the state archive, the Ministry of the Interior in Mainz granted approval for Oberhausen bei Kirn to bear its own arms on 29 December 1965. The municipal banner also bears this coat of arms in the centre.

== Culture and sightseeing ==
=== Buildings ===
The following are listed buildings or sites in Rhineland-Palatinate's Directory of Cultural Monuments:

- Evangelical church, Dhauner Straße 29 – formerly Saint Mary's (St. Maria), Late Gothic quire, from the latter half of the 15th century, Baroque aisleless church, 1743
- Assumption of Mary Catholic Parish Church (Pfarrkirche Mariä Himmelfahrt), Soonwaldstraße – Gothic Revival aisleless church, 1897/1898, architect Josef Dormann, Wiesbaden
- Dhauner Straße 4/6 – estate complex, 19th century; timber-frame house, timber-frame barns, storage building, parental cottage
- Near Hintergasse 7 – well, 18th century (?), altered 1922
- Soonwaldstraße – warriors' memorial 1914–1918; cast-stone obelisk, after 1920, expanded after 1945
- Soonwaldstraße 34 – Catholic rectory; building with hip roof and Gothic elements, 1898
- Schloss Wartenstein, above the Kellenbach valley – ringwall remnants of the castle complex founded in 1347, destroyed in 1689; Baroque palatial castle (Schloss), 1704, lengthened in 1728, commercial building 1723, little gatehouse possibly from 1732; cavalier's building, from the latter half of the 18th century

=== More about the churches ===
The Evangelical church with its Gothic quire with colourful painting comes from the latter half of the 15th century. It was given a new nave in 1743, and until 1898 it was a shared church, used by both Protestants and Catholics. It was in that year that the groundwork was laid for the new Catholic church.

=== Clubs ===
The following clubs are active in Oberhausen bei Kirn:

- Förderverein der freiwilligen Feuerwehr Oberhausen — volunteer fire brigade promotional association
- Heimat- und Kulturverein Oberhausen e.V. — local history and culture club
- Jugendtreff 1991 Oberhausen — youth club
- MGV 1929 Oberhausen e.V. — men's singing club
- Musikverein 1947 e.V. — music club
- SV Oberhausen 1922 e.V. — sport club

== Economy and infrastructure ==
=== Transport ===
Meeting in the village are Kreisstraßen 5 and 11. The former leads southwards to neighbouring Kirn. The junction of Bundesstraßen 41 and 421 lies a few kilometres east of Kirn. One can also board a train at Kirn on the Nahe Valley Railway (Bingen–Saarbrücken). The travel time on the hourly Regionalexpress trains to Saarbrücken is 1 hour and 10 minutes, while Mainz can be reached in just under an hour. Every other train to and from Frankfurt also runs through to Frankfurt Airport. Frankfurt-Hahn Airport lies some 30 km away from Kirn and can be reached from the town by car in just under a half-hour.

== Famous people ==
=== Sons and daughters of the town ===
- Otto Groß (1901–1981), German politician (Free Democratic Party, Member of the Landtag of Rhineland-Palatinate)
