= Meckenbach =

- Municipality
- Coat of arms

- Location of Meckenbach within Bad Kreuznach district
- Interactive map of Meckenbach
- Location within Germany Location within Rhineland-Palatinate
- Coordinates: 49°46′42″N 7°30′46″E
- Country: Germany
- State: Rhineland-Palatinate
- District: Bad Kreuznach
- Municipal assoc.: Kirner Land

Government
  - Mayor (2019–24): Michael Schlarb

Area
  - Total: 6.97 km^{2} (2.69 sq mi)
- Elevation: 280 m (920 ft)

Population (2025-12-31)
  - Total: 352
  - Density: 50.5/km^{2} (131/sq mi)
- Time zone: UTC+01:00 (CET)
  - Summer (DST): UTC+02:00 (CEST)
- Postal codes: 55606
- Dialling codes: 06752
- Vehicle registration: KH
- Website: www.meckenbach.de

Meckenbach (German pronunciation: [ˈmɛkn̩bax]) is an Ortsgemeinde – a municipality belonging to a Verbandsgemeinde, a kind of collective municipality – in the Bad Kreuznach district in Rhineland-Palatinate, Germany. It belongs to the Verbandsgemeinde Kirner Land, whose seat is in the town of Kirn.

== Geography ==
=== Location ===
Meckenbach lies in the northern foothills of the North Palatine Uplands in a side dale of the Nahe.

=== Neighbouring municipalities ===
Clockwise from the north, Meckenbach's neighbours are the municipalities of Hochstetten-Dhaun, Merxheim and Heimweiler and the town of Kirn, all of which likewise lie within the Bad Kreuznach district.

== History ==
Only seldom is Meckenbach mentioned in old documents. In the church register, a Meckenbach clergyman wrote that the derivation of the village's name is even shrouded in darkness. It might be named after somebody named “Macko”, and would therefore mean “Macko’s Brook”, but this is not known for certain. The still current names for the village of “Hofhaus” and “Hofacker” (Hof can mean either “estate” or “farm” in German, while Haus means “house” and Acker means “field”, especially a cropfield) lead to the belief that the dale was settled with a few homesteads quite early on. In 1969-1970, an excavator being used in a gravel pit on the village's outskirts in the high-lying area known as “Schmidts Eich” brought up some square stone urns, such as are also kept at the Bad Kreuznach local history museum. They come from one of the 36 barrows. The stone urns, which according to Karoline Cauer's thinking were used in Roman burials, are held to be proof that the Meckenbacher Schmelze (“Meckenbach smelter”) already existed in Roman times. Moreover, copper slag have been unearthed and entrances to former copper mining galleries have been found. Long before the Romans and the Germanic peoples, in prehistoric times, the Bronze Age and the Iron Age (La Tène times), the Celts who dwelt on both sides of the Rhine already knew how to smelt copper and iron ores. That in itself is enough to believe that there was a settlement at what is now Meckenbach even then. In 451, the Huns, who had thrust out of Central Asia, were driven out at the bloody Battle of the Catalaunian Plains near Châlons-en-Champagne on the Marne. They left behind them burnt houses and depopulated countryside as traces of their flight. When the Alamanni arrived, they found destroyed villages and neglected fields. About 1000, Archbishop of Mainz and Imperial Archchancellor Willigis had a church built in Meckenbach, which was made subject to Disibodenberg Abbey. The original building is essential still preserved. It is a plain quarrystone building built in the Romanesque style with an east tower. The nave underwent an expansion about 1750. The church is also equipped with an organ from 1836, built by the Brothers Stumm from Rhaunensulzbach, which was renovated in 1981. The village always belonged in the Middle Ages to the Waldgravial Amt of Kyrburg, and in 1550 it became Calvinist. Even the peasants from Meckenbach had to pay the so-called Zollhafer (a toll in oats) to the Lords of Steinkallenfels whenever they wanted to sell their wares at Kirn Market. Until the late 18th century, Meckenbach was a Schultheißerei seat within the Oberamt of Kyrburg, where an official from the lordship provided the village administration as a Schultheiß in the name of the Waldgraves and Rhinegraves of Kyrburg. After French Revolutionary troops had overrun the German lands on the Rhine's left bank and imposed their own administrative system on the conquered lands, Meckenbach was assigned about 1800 to the newly formed Mairie (“Mayoralty”) of Merxheim in the Canton of Meisenheim, also belonging to which were Bärweiler, Überhochstetten (Hochstetten) and Merxheim. This subsequently remained in force as the Oberschultheißerei of Merxheim within the Oberamt of Meisenheim once Napoleonic times were over and the village had passed under the terms of the Congress of Vienna to the Landgraviate of Hesse-Homburg. After the Oberamt of Meisenheim passed to the Kingdom of Prussia in September 1866, Meckenbach was assigned to the Bürgermeisterei (“Mayoralty”) of Meddersheim, wherein it remained until 1940, when it was assigned, along with Hochstetten, to the Amt of Kirn-Land.

== Religion ==
As at 31 October 2013, there are 394 full-time residents in Meckenbach, and of those, 304 are Evangelical (77.157%), 52 are Catholic (13.198%), 2 belong to the Mainz Free Religious Community (0.508%) and 36 (9.137%) either have no religion or will not reveal their religious affiliation.

== Politics ==
=== Municipal council ===
The council is made up of 8 council members, who were elected by majority vote at the municipal election held on 7 June 2009, and the honorary mayor as chairman.

=== Mayor ===
Meckenbach's mayor is Michael Schlarb.

=== Coat of arms ===
The German blazon reads: In gespaltenem Schild vorn in Schwarz neben sechs silbernen Sternen ein silbernes Wolfseisen, hinten in Gold ein blaubewerter und -gezungter roter Löwe.

The municipality's arms might in English heraldic language be described thus: Per pale sable a cramp palewise between six mullets palewise three and three, all argent, and Or a lion rampant gules armed and langued azure.

The charges on the dexter (armsbearer's right, viewer's left) side, the mullets (six-pointed star shapes) and the cramp (or in German, Wolfsangel, commonly held to be a kind of wolf trap, although the interpretation in English heraldry is as a kind of structural strengthener) are drawn from an old 1698 Meckenbach court seal. The charge on the sinister (armsbearer's left, viewer's right) side is a reference to the village's former allegiance to the Waldgraves and Rhinegraves of Kyrburg. From times of yore right up until the last phase of the Napoleonic Wars, the wolf was the main threat among wild animals to man's well-being in the Nahe region, especially the Hunsrück, filled as it was with gorges and woodland. In hard times brought on by war and harsh winters, packs of wolves became a frightful menace. The wolf was the epitome of deadly enmity and merciless bloodlust. Many knightly families, towns and municipalities in the Meckenbach region bear the Wolfsangel or Wolfseisen (“wolf hook” or “wolf iron”) charge in their arms, surely as a mark of their homeland as an expression of their courage. In 1814, when the lands on the Rhine's left bank once again became German, the authorities gave strict instructions for fighting wolves. Wolves had become a menace once again in Napoleonic times, for they had been left alone to multiply, as later were the wild boars during and after the Second World War. In Meckenbach, the “Wolfskaul” on the slope next to the mountain gorge recalls the danger from wolves in bygone days. Municipal council, on 20 October 1963, gave the graphic artist Brust from Kirn-Sulzbach the task of designing a municipal coat of arms. At a council meeting on 17 July 1964, council adopted the design that had been put forth. After consent by the state archive, the Ministry of the Interior in Mainz granted approval for Meckenbach to bear its own arms on 14 May 1965.

== Culture and sightseeing ==
=== Buildings ===
The following are listed buildings or sites in Rhineland-Palatinate’s Directory of Cultural Monuments:

- Evangelical church, Hauptstraße 48 – Romanesque quire tower church, portal 11th century, nave lengthened in 1756, Gothic quire window, 1439, tower top timber-frame with roof lantern, 1853
- Hauptstraße 50 – Evangelical rectory; building with half-hip roof, Heimatstil, marked 1919 and 1921
- Hauptstraße 56 – communal bakehouse, 19th century
- At Hauptstraße 60 – house door, marked 1851
- In der Bräbach 1 – former school; Late Classicist standard design, mid 19th century
- In der Gass 14 – Late Baroque timber-frame house, plastered, possibly from the late 18th century

The Evangelical church is also equipped with a Stumm organ from 1836.

== Economy and infrastructure ==
=== Transport ===
Running to the north is Bundesstraße 41. Serving Kirn is a railway station on the Nahe Valley Railway (Bingen–Saarbrücken).
