= Limbach, Bad Kreuznach =

Limbach
- Municipality
- Coat of arms

- Location of Limbach within Bad Kreuznach district
- Interactive map of Limbach
- Location within Germany Location within Rhineland-Palatinate
- Coordinates: 49°44′28″N 07°32′45″E
- Country: Germany
- State: Rhineland-Palatinate
- District: Bad Kreuznach
- Municipal assoc.: Kirner Land

Government
  - Mayor (2019–24): Thorsten Pröschel

Area
  - Total: 9.18 km^{2} (3.54 sq mi)
- Elevation: 308 m (1,010 ft)

Population (2025-12-31)
  - Total: 298
  - Density: 32.5/km^{2} (84.1/sq mi)
- Time zone: UTC+01:00 (CET)
  - Summer (DST): UTC+02:00 (CEST)
- Postal codes: 55606
- Dialling codes: 06757
- Vehicle registration: KH

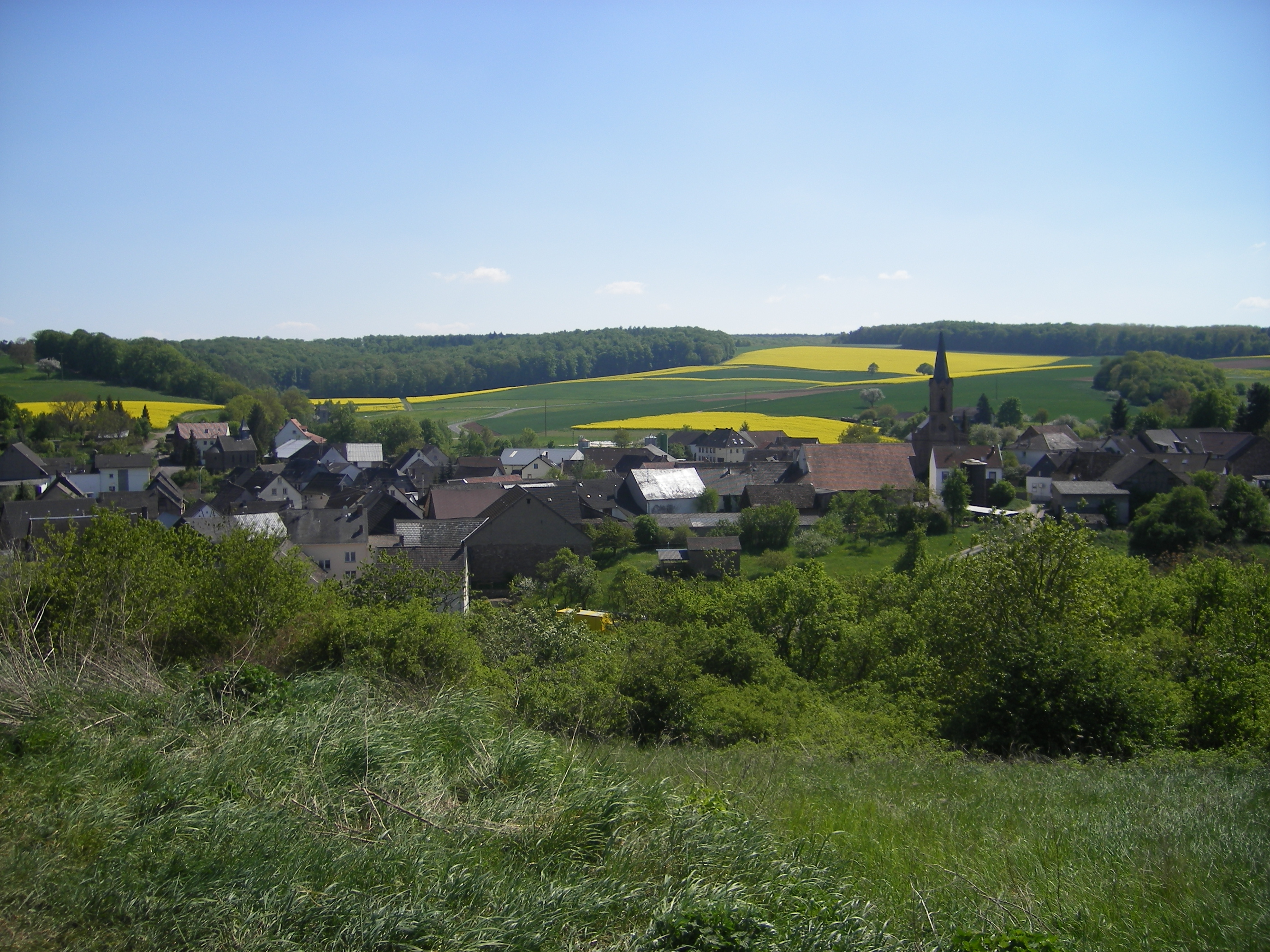
View of Limbach

Limbach (German pronunciation: [ˈlɪmbax]) is an Ortsgemeinde – a municipality belonging to a Verbandsgemeinde, a kind of collective municipality – in the Bad Kreuznach district in Rhineland-Palatinate, Germany. It belongs to the Verbandsgemeinde Kirner Land, whose seat is in the town of Kirn.

== Geography ==
=== Location ===
Limbach is a clump village that lies on the like-named brook, the Limbach, in the North Palatine Uplands. The outlying centre of Welschrötherhof lies just under 3 km to the south-southwest of the village.

=== Neighbouring municipalities ===
Clockwise from the north, Limbach's neighbours are the municipalities of Merxheim, Kirschroth, Hundsbach, Schweinschied, Hoppstädten, Otzweiler, Becherbach bei Kirn and Heimweiler, all of which but for Hoppstädten, which lies in the neighbouring Kusel district, likewise lie within the Bad Kreuznach district.

=== Constituent communities ===
Also belonging to Limbach is the outlying homestead of Welschrötherhof.

== History ==
In the Middle Ages, Limbach belonged to the Raugravial Amt of Naumburg or the court district of Becherbach, a half share of which passed to the Counts of Sponheim-Kreuznach about 1350, with the other half passing into their ownership towards the end of the 14th century. Together with Becherbach and Schmidthachenbach, Limbach was one of the biggest places in the Amt of Naumburg, which in the 18th century fell under the lordship of the Margraves of Baden. About 1600, there were 26 households in the village. Limbach, too, had to pay the Zollhafer (“toll oats”) to the Lords of Steinkallenfels whenever farmers from Limbach wanted to sell their wares at Kirn market. After French Revolutionary troops overran the German lands on the Rhine’s left bank, the villages in the Amt of Naumburg, which had been merged into the Amt of Herrstein in 1776, lay under French rule beginning in 1794. Limbach was grouped, along with Heimberg and Krebsweiler, into the Mairie (“Mayoralty”) of Hundsbach in the Canton of Meisenheim. After the Napoleonic French had been driven out, Becherbach once again became the mayoral seat for these municipalities, which now became part of the Oberamt of Meisenheim in Hesse-Homburg. During this Landgravial time, Evangelical inhabitants built a new Gothic Revival church in the years 1858 to 1860 to plans laid out by Meisenheim architect Krausch. The Catholic chapel that still stands today was built in 1893 and 1894 on the spot where the old church square once was. By 1864, Limbach, now a village of 380 inhabitants, had grown to 56 houses occupied by 94 families. In 1866, the village passed to the Kingdom of Prussia. In 1932, when the Meisenheim district was dissolved, Limbach was reassigned to the Kreuznach district. In 1940, the Amt of Becherbach was likewise dissolved, and Limbach's new Amt was then Kirn-Land, within which it still finds itself now, although it has been redefined as a Verbandsgemeinde.

== Religion ==
As at 31 October 2013, there are 305 full-time residents in Limbach, and of those, 211 are Evangelical (69.18%), 58 are Catholic (19.016%) and 36 (11.803%) either have no religion or will not reveal their religious affiliation.

== Politics ==
=== Municipal council ===
The council is made up of 8 council members, who were elected by majority vote at the municipal election held on 7 June 2009, and the honorary mayor as chairman.

=== Mayor ===
Limbach's mayor is Thorsten Pröschel.

=== Coat of arms ===
The German blazon reads: In geteiltem Schild oben in Gold ein schwarzer Pflug, unten blau-gold geschacht.

The municipality's arms might in English heraldic language be described thus: Per fess Or a plough sable and chequy of azure and Or.

The charge in the upper field, the plough, refers to Limbach's agricultural structure; the village was until not very many years ago still a purely agricultural community. The “chequy” pattern in the lower field is a reference to the village's former allegiance to the “Further” County of Sponheim. Municipal council, on 8 December 1963, gave the graphic artist Brust from Kirn-Sulzbach the task of designing a municipal coat of arms. At a council meeting on 13 April 1965, council adopted the design that had been put forth. After consent by the state archive, the Ministry of the Interior in Mainz granted approval for Limbach to bear its own arms on 12 May 1965. The municipal banner also bears this coat of arms in the centre.

== Culture and sightseeing ==
=== Buildings ===
The following are listed buildings or sites in Rhineland-Palatinate’s Directory of Cultural Monuments:

- Evangelical church, Hauptstraße 6 – Gothic Revival aisleless church, 1858–1860, architect Krausch, Meisenheim
- Saint Boniface’s Catholic Church (Kirche St. Bonifatius), Schulstraße 11 – Romanesquified aisleless church, 1892/1893, architect Walther, Lauterecken, destroyed in 1944/1945, reconstructed before 1952
- Hauptstraße – warriors’ memorial 1914-1918, cast-stone column, possibly about 1930
- Im Winkel 1 – timber-frame house, plastered and slated, possibly from the early 19th century
- Vordergasse 14 – estate complex along the street, late 18th to early 19th century; house und stable-barn, partly slated timber framing

=== The 1913 Monument ===
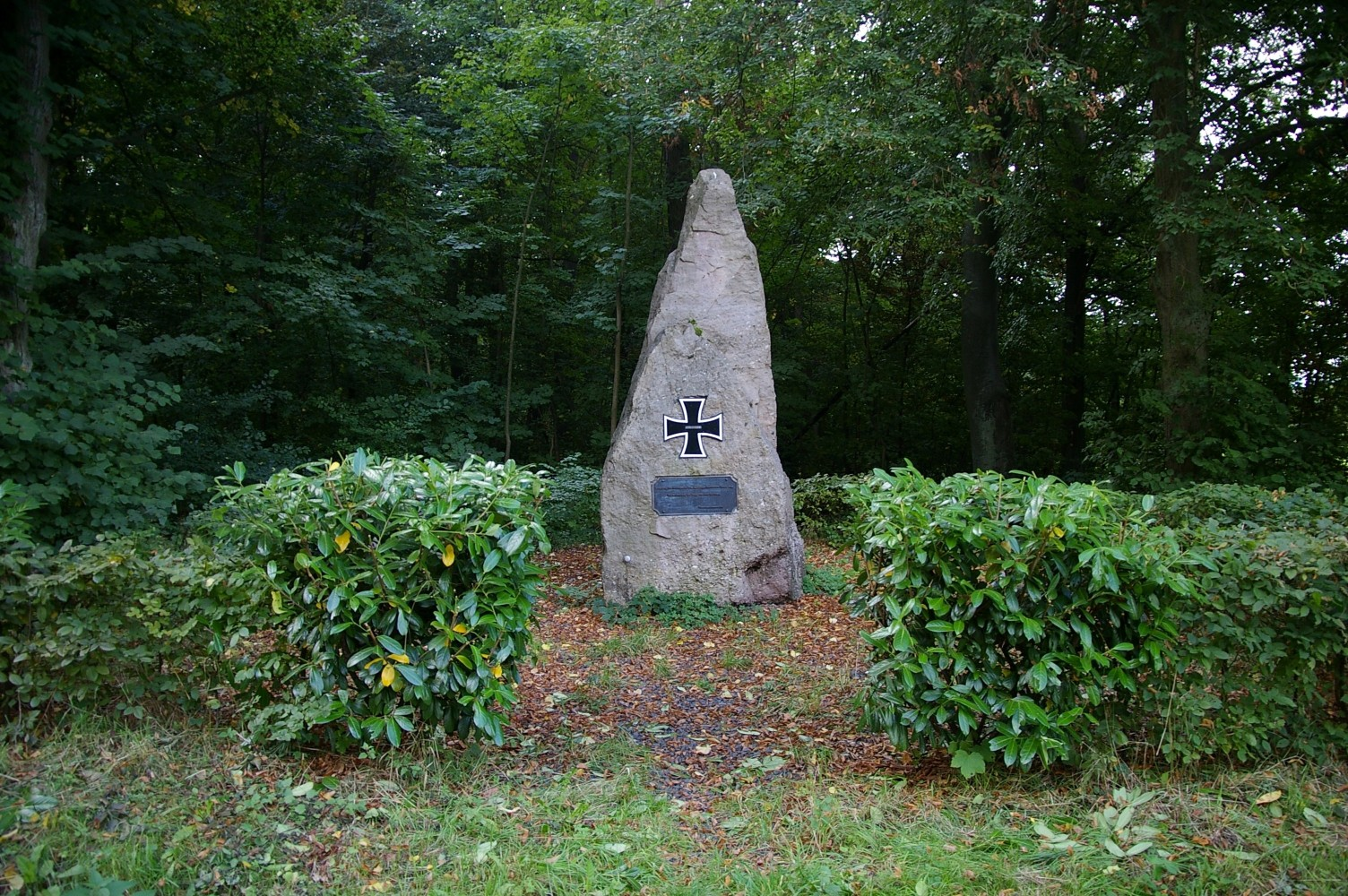
The 1913 Monument

South of the village, at the junction where Kreisstraße 71 ends at Landesstraße 182, stands a monument dating from 1913 to the memory of the “Freeing of the Rhineland from the 12-Year Enemy Occupation”, a reference to Blücher's success in driving the Napoleonic French out of the region in 1814, 99 years earlier. In 2001, this monument was given a thorough restoration.

=== Clubs ===
The following clubs are active in Limbach:

- Förderverein der freiwilligen Feuerwehr Limbach e.V. — fire brigade promotional association
- Jugendclub “Flakhalle” Limbach e.V. — youth club
- Kultur- und Verschönerungsverein e.V. — culture and beautification club
- Landfrauen Limbach — countrywomen's club
- MGV Gemischter Chor Limbach e.V. — mixed choir
- SV Limbach e.V. — sport club

== Economy and infrastructure ==
=== Transport ===
Running through Limbach is Kreisstraße 71. Branching off this in the middle of the village is another road that leads to neighbouring Kirschroth. Bundesstraße 41 runs to the north between Kirn and Bad Sobernheim. Serving Kirn is a railway station on the Nahe Valley Railway (Bingen–Saarbrücken).
