= Kirner Land =

Verbandsgemeinde in Rhineland-Palatinate, Germany

- Verbandsgemeinde
- Location of Kirner Land within Bad Kreuznach district
- Interactive map of Kirner Land
- Location within Germany Location within Rhineland-Palatinate
- Coordinates: 49°47′N 7°28′E
- Country: Germany
- State: Rhineland-Palatinate
- District: Bad Kreuznach
- Seat: Kirn
- Subdivisions: 21 municipalities

Area
  - Total: 134.44 km^{2} (51.91 sq mi)

Population (2025-12-31)
  - Total: 18,240
  - Density: 135.7/km^{2} (351.4/sq mi)
- Time zone: UTC+01:00 (CET)
  - Summer (DST): UTC+02:00 (CEST)
- Website: www.kirner-land.de

Kirner Land is a Verbandsgemeinde ("collective municipality") in the district of Bad Kreuznach, Rhineland-Palatinate, Germany. The seat of the Verbandsgemeinde is in Kirn. It was formed on 1 January 2020 by the merger of the former Verbandsgemeinde Kirn-Land and the town Kirn.

The Verbandsgemeinde Kirner Land consists of the following Ortsgemeinden ("local municipalities"):

1. Bärenbach
2. Becherbach bei Kirn
3. Brauweiler
4. Bruschied
5. Hahnenbach
6. Heimweiler
7. Heinzenberg
8. Hennweiler
9. Hochstetten-Dhaun
10. Horbach
11. Kellenbach
12. Kirn
13. Königsau
14. Limbach
15. Meckenbach
16. Oberhausen bei Kirn
17. Otzweiler
18. Schneppenbach
19. Schwarzerden
20. Simmertal
21. Weitersborn
