= Spall, Germany =

Spall
- Municipality
- Coat of arms

- Location of Spall within Bad Kreuznach district
- Interactive map of Spall
- Location within Germany Location within Rhineland-Palatinate
- Coordinates: 49°53′0.1″N 7°40′48.47″E
- Country: Germany
- State: Rhineland-Palatinate
- District: Bad Kreuznach
- Municipal assoc.: Rüdesheim

Government
  - Mayor (2019–24): Bernd Closen

Area
  - Total: 14.29 km^{2} (5.52 sq mi)
- Elevation: 350 m (1,150 ft)

Population (2025-12-31)
  - Total: 182
  - Density: 12.7/km^{2} (33.0/sq mi)
- Time zone: UTC+01:00 (CET)
  - Summer (DST): UTC+02:00 (CEST)
- Postal codes: 55595
- Dialling codes: 06706
- Vehicle registration: KH

Spall is a municipality in the district of Bad Kreuznach in Rhineland-Palatinate, in western Germany.
