= Königsau =

- Municipality
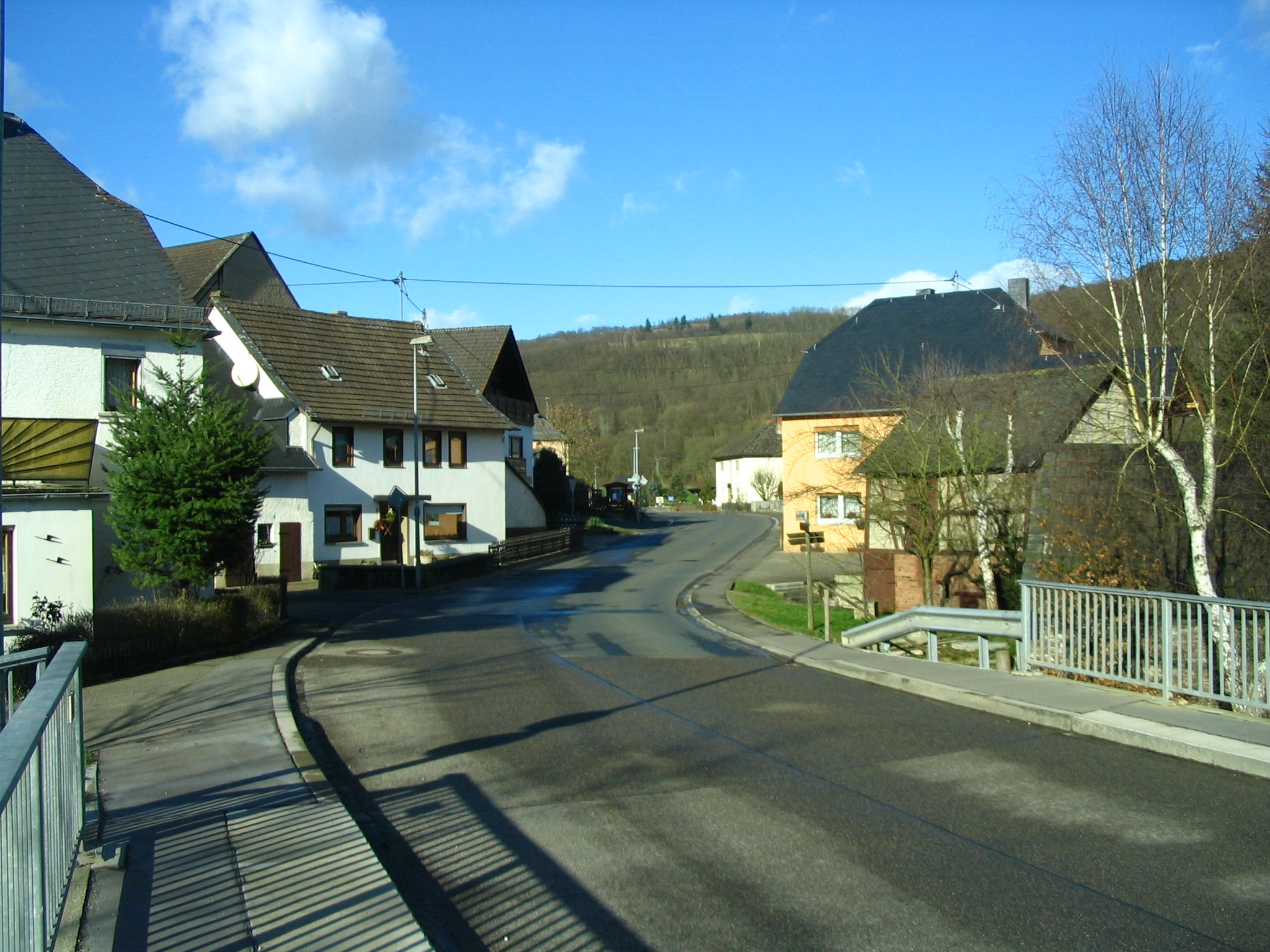

- Coat of arms

- Location of Königsau within Bad Kreuznach district
- Interactive map of Königsau
- Location within Germany Location within Rhineland-Palatinate
- Coordinates: 49°51′24″N 07°29′18″E
- Country: Germany
- State: Rhineland-Palatinate
- District: Bad Kreuznach
- Municipal assoc.: Kirner Land

Government
  - Mayor (2023–24): Klaus Brühl

Area
  - Total: 2.02 km^{2} (0.78 sq mi)
- Elevation: 240 m (790 ft)

Population (2025-12-31)
  - Total: 66
  - Density: 33/km^{2} (85/sq mi)
- Time zone: UTC+01:00 (CET)
  - Summer (DST): UTC+02:00 (CEST)
- Postal codes: 55606
- Dialling codes: 06765
- Vehicle registration: KH

Königsau is an Ortsgemeinde – a municipality belonging to a Verbandsgemeinde, a kind of collective municipality – in the Bad Kreuznach district in Rhineland-Palatinate, Germany. It belongs to the Verbandsgemeinde Kirner Land, whose seat is in the town of Kirn.

== Geography ==
=== Location ===
Königsau lies in a dale in the southern Hunsrück at the edge of the Soonwald and Lützelsoon. The Kellenbach flows through the village.

=== Neighbouring municipalities ===
Clockwise from the north, Königsau’s neighbours are the municipalities of Henau, Kellenbach, Schlierschied and – at one point only – Gehlweiler. Of these, only Kellenbach likewise lies within the Bad Kreuznach district. All the others lie in the neighbouring Rhein-Hunsrück-Kreis.

== History ==
In 1325, Königsau had its first documentary mention as Kunigesauwe. Later spellings of the name, in modern times, render it Königß Auen (1601) or Kinzau (1766), the latter of which is preserved to this day in the name for the village used in the local speech, “Kinze”. The mediaeval name goes back to the Old High German cuning (meaning the same as and cognate with the English word “king”; it is König in Modern High German), which has led to the conclusion that the Königsau-Kellenbach area was once a royal or Imperial estate. Fitting this interpretation would be the Lords of Stein (Steinkallenfels), who exercised jurisdiction as Imperial ministeriales at the high court of Kellenbach. In 1325, Baldwin, Prince-Archbishop-Elector of Trier, acquired from the knight Sir Friedrich of Steinkallenfels shares of the holdings and rights that he held in Königsau and Schwarzerden and had split off from the landholds owned by Count Johann of Sponheim. In 1334, the Archbishop bought, among other things, a mill complex in Königsau, with which his successor Bohemond II of Trier enfeoffed Sir Tilmann of Stein – of the same knightly house – who was also the builder of Castle Wartenstein. In the time that followed, the Archbishops of Trier further enfeoffed various families of the lower nobility, such as the families von Elz, von Rüdesheim and von der Leyen, and the Vögte of Hunolstein, with the Trier landholds and rights in Königsau. It is, however, unclear who held sway over Königsau in the 17th and 18th centuries. Although Trier state law prevailed in Königsau, sovereignty thereover was disputable, for, on the one hand, the Electorate of Trier claimed it for itself, whereas on the other hand, the Baron of Warsberg viewed the village as an allodial, Imperial, knightly landhold. Königsau was furthermore part of the court of Kellenbach, which was subject to the Sponheim Amt of Kirchberg. In 1708, this Amt was transferred to the Margrave of Baden in the wake of the division of the “Further” County of Sponheim. The tangle of rights and allegiances to various lords during the time of the old empire was swept aside when, beginning in the years 1792-1794, the Revolutionary French overran the German lands on the Rhine’s left bank and occupied them, eventually placing the region under a central administration in 1798. Königsau and Kellenbach belonged as of roughly 1800 to the Mairie (“Mayoralty”) of Kirn in the Arrondissement of Simmern, in which it remained (albeit under other terminology than “Arrondissement”) until 1969. In the course of administrative restructuring in Rhineland-Palatinate, Königsau and Kellenbach were grouped into the new Verbandsgemeinde of Kirn-Land on 8 November 1970.

== Religion ==
As at 30 September 2013, there are 69 full-time residents in Königsau, and of those, 43 are Evangelical (62.319%), 16 are Catholic (23.188%), 1 is Greek Orthodox (1.449%), 1 belongs to the Palatinate State Free Religious Community (1.449%) and 8 (11.594%) either have no religion or will not reveal their religious affiliation.

== Politics ==
=== Municipal council ===
The council is made up of 6 council members, who were elected by majority vote at the municipal election held on 7 June 2009, and the honorary mayor as chairman.

=== Mayor ===
Klaus Brühl became mayor of Königsau on August 10, 2023.

=== Coat of arms ===
The German blazon reads: In geteiltem Schild oben in Schwarz ein goldbewehrter und -gezungter und -gekrönter silberner Löwe, unten in Silber ein erhöhter grüner Dreiberg, belegt mit einer goldenen Krone.

The municipality’s arms might in English heraldic language be described thus: Per fess sable a demilion with forked tail argent armed, langued and crowned Or, and argent a trimount enhanced vert surmounted by a crown of the third.

The charge in the upper field, the upper half of a lion, is drawn from arms formerly borne by the Barons of Warsberg, who through inheritance became the landholders in Königsau in 1585. The trimount in the lower field symbolizes the hilly landscape in the municipality, while the crown refers to the village’s name, Königsau (König means “king” in German). On 19 October 1978, municipal council gave the graphic artist Brust from Kirn-Sulzbach the task of designing a municipal coat of arms. At a council meeting on 11 May 1979, council adopted the design that had been put forth. After consent by the state archive, the Ministry of the Interior in Mainz granted approval for Kellenbach to bear its own arms on 15 August 1979. The municipal banner also bears this coat of arms in the centre.

== Culture and sightseeing ==
=== Clubs ===
Since it is a very small place, Königsau does not have much of a club life, but it does have three clubs, although one is shared with neighbouring Kellenbach:

- Freunde und Förderer der freiwilligen Feuerwehr Königsau — volunteer fire brigade promotional association
- Heimatverein Königsau — local history club
- TuS Königsau-Kellenbach e.V. — gymnastic and sport club

== Economy and infrastructure ==
=== Transport ===
Running through the village is Bundesstraße 421. Serving Martinstein is a railway station on the Nahe Valley Railway (Bingen–Saarbrücken). Frankfurt-Hahn Airport is one of the region’s important economic factors.

== Famous people ==
=== Sons and daughters of the town ===
- Jenniffer Kae (b. 1 June 1987), singer
- Laura Kästel (b. 29 September 1992), singer
