= Bad Kreuznach (district) =

Coordinates: 49°50′N 7°50′E

- District
- Flag Coat of arms
- Country: Germany
- State: Rhineland-Palatinate
- Capital: Bad Kreuznach

Government
  - District admin.: Bettina Dickes (CDU)

Area
  - Total: 863.72 km^{2} (333.48 sq mi)

Population (31 December 2024)
  - Total: 161,852
  - Density: 187.39/km^{2} (485.34/sq mi)
- Time zone: UTC+01:00 (CET)
  - Summer (DST): UTC+02:00 (CEST)
- Vehicle registration: KH
- Website: kreis-badkreuznach.de

Bad Kreuznach (German: [baːt ˈkʁɔʏtsnax]) is a district in Rhineland-Palatinate, Germany. It is bounded by (from the north and clockwise) the districts of Rhein-Hunsrück, Mainz-Bingen, Alzey-Worms, Donnersbergkreis, Kusel and Birkenfeld.

== History ==
The region is full of medieval castles, especially along the Nahe River. Best known is the Kyrburg of Kirn, built in the 12th century and sitting in state above the river. In 1815, the district of Kreuznach was established by the Prussian government. In 1932, it was merged with the district of Meisenheim. The name of the district officially changed from Kreuznach to Bad Kreuznach in 1969.

== Geography ==
The district is located in the hilly country between the mountain chains of the Hunsrück in the north and the North Palatine Uplands in the south. The main axis of the district is the Nahe River, which enters the territory in the west, runs through Kirn, Bad Sobernheim and Bad Kreuznach, and leaves to the northeast.

The region formed by this district and the adjoining Birkenfeld district is known as the Naheland. The banks of the lower Nahe are used for vineyards. Away from the stream, there are sparsely populated forests crisscrossed by the narrow affluents of the Nahe River.

== Coat of arms ==
The coat of arms displays:

- the heraldic lion of the Palatinate;
- the blue and golden pattern of the medieval county of Sponheim.

== Towns and municipalities ==
Verband-free towns
1. Bad Kreuznach

Verbandsgemeinden
1. Bad Kreuznach; [seat: Bad Kreuznach]: 1. Altenbamberg; 2. Biebelsheim; 3. Feilbingert; 4. Frei-Laubersheim; 5. Fürfeld; 6. Hackenheim; 7. Hallgarten; 8. Hochstätten; 9. Neu-Bamberg; 10. Pfaffen-Schwabenheim; 11. Pleitersheim; 12. Tiefenthal; 13. Volxheim	2. Kirner Land; 1. Bärenbach; 2. Becherbach bei Kirn; 3. Brauweiler; 4. Bruschied; 5. Hahnenbach; 6. Heimweiler; 7. Heinzenberg; 8. Hennweiler; 9. Hochstetten-Dhaun; 10. Horbach; 11. Kellenbach; 12. Kirn^{1, 2}; 13. Königsau; 14. Limbach; 15. Meckenbach; 16. Oberhausen bei Kirn; 17. Otzweiler; 18. Schneppenbach; 19. Schwarzerden; 20. Simmertal; 21. Weitersborn	3. Langenlonsheim-Stromberg; 1. Bretzenheim; 2. Daxweiler; 3. Dörrebach; 4. Dorsheim; 5. Eckenroth; 6. Guldental; 7. Langenlonsheim^{1}; 8. Laubenheim; 9. Roth; 10. Rümmelsheim; 11. Schöneberg; 12. Schweppenhausen; 13. Seibersbach; 14. Stromberg^{2}; 15. Waldlaubersheim; 16. Warmsroth; 17. Windesheim	4. Nahe-Glan; 1. Abtweiler; 2. Auen; 3. Bad Sobernheim^{1, 2}; 4. Bärweiler; 5. Becherbach; 6. Breitenheim; 7. Callbach; 8. Daubach; 9. Desloch; 10. Hundsbach; 11. Ippenschied; 12. Jeckenbach; 13. Kirschroth; 14. Langenthal; 15. Lauschied; 16. Lettweiler; 17. Löllbach; 18. Martinstein; 19. Meddersheim; 20. Meisenheim^{2}; 21. Merxheim; 22. Monzingen; 23. Nußbaum; 24. Odernheim am Glan; 25. Raumbach; 26. Rehbach; 27. Rehborn; 28. Reiffelbach; 29. Schmittweiler; 30. Schweinschied; 31. Seesbach; 32. Staudernheim; 33. Weiler bei Monzingen; 34. Winterburg	5. Rüdesheim; 1. Allenfeld; 2. Argenschwang; 3. Bockenau; 4. Boos; 5. Braunweiler; 6. Burgsponheim; 7. Dalberg; 8. Duchroth; 9. Gebroth; 10. Gutenberg; 11. Hargesheim; 12. Hergenfeld; 13. Hüffelsheim; 14. Mandel; 15. Münchwald; 16. Niederhausen; 17. Norheim; 18. Oberhausen an der Nahe; 19. Oberstreit; 20. Roxheim; 21. Rüdesheim an der Nahe^{1}; 22. Sankt Katharinen; 23. Schloßböckelheim; 24. Sommerloch; 25. Spabrücken; 26. Spall; 27. Sponheim; 28. Traisen; 29. Waldböckelheim; 30. Wallhausen; 31. Weinsheim; 32. Winterbach
^{1}seat of the Verbandsgemeinde; ^{2}town

== Politics ==
Kreuznach (electoral district) for the Bundestag.
