= Weitersborn =

- Municipality
- Coat of arms

- Location of Weitersborn within Bad Kreuznach district
- Interactive map of Weitersborn
- Location within Germany Location within Rhineland-Palatinate
- Coordinates: 49°51′05″N 07°31′38″E
- Country: Germany
- State: Rhineland-Palatinate
- District: Bad Kreuznach
- Municipal assoc.: Kirner Land

Government
  - Mayor (2019–24): Bruno Stemmler

Area
  - Total: 3.12 km^{2} (1.20 sq mi)
- Elevation: 380 m (1,250 ft)

Population (2025-12-31)
  - Total: 189
  - Density: 60.6/km^{2} (157/sq mi)
- Time zone: UTC+01:00 (CET)
  - Summer (DST): UTC+02:00 (CEST)
- Postal codes: 55629
- Dialling codes: 06754
- Vehicle registration: KH

Weitersborn is a municipality in the district of Bad Kreuznach in Rhineland-Palatinate, in western Germany.
