= Kirn-Sulzbach =

Sulzbach
- Stadtteil of Kirn
- Interactive map of Sulzbach
- Location within Germany Location within Rhineland-Palatinate
- Coordinates: 49°45′51″N 7°26′2″E
- Country: Germany
- State: Rhineland-Palatinate
- District: Bad Kreuznach
- Town: Kirn

Government
  - Mayor: Toni Görner (CDU)
- Elevation: 200 m (660 ft)

Population (2011)
  - Total: 840
- Time zone: UTC+01:00 (CET)
  - Summer (DST): UTC+02:00 (CEST)
- Postal codes: 55606
- Dialling codes: 06752
- Vehicle registration: KH
- Website: www.kirn.de

Kirn-Sulzbach (also: Kirnsulzbach) is a Stadtteil of Kirn in the district of Bad Kreuznach, in Rhineland-Palatinate, Germany.

== See also ==
- Kirn-Sulzbach in German Language
