= Bad Sobernheim (Verbandsgemeinde) =

Coordinates: 49.788°N 7.652°E

Bad Sobernheim is a former Verbandsgemeinde ("collective municipality") in the district of Bad Kreuznach, Rhineland-Palatinate, Germany. The seat of the Verbandsgemeinde was in Bad Sobernheim. On 1 January 2020 it was merged into the new Verbandsgemeinde Nahe-Glan.

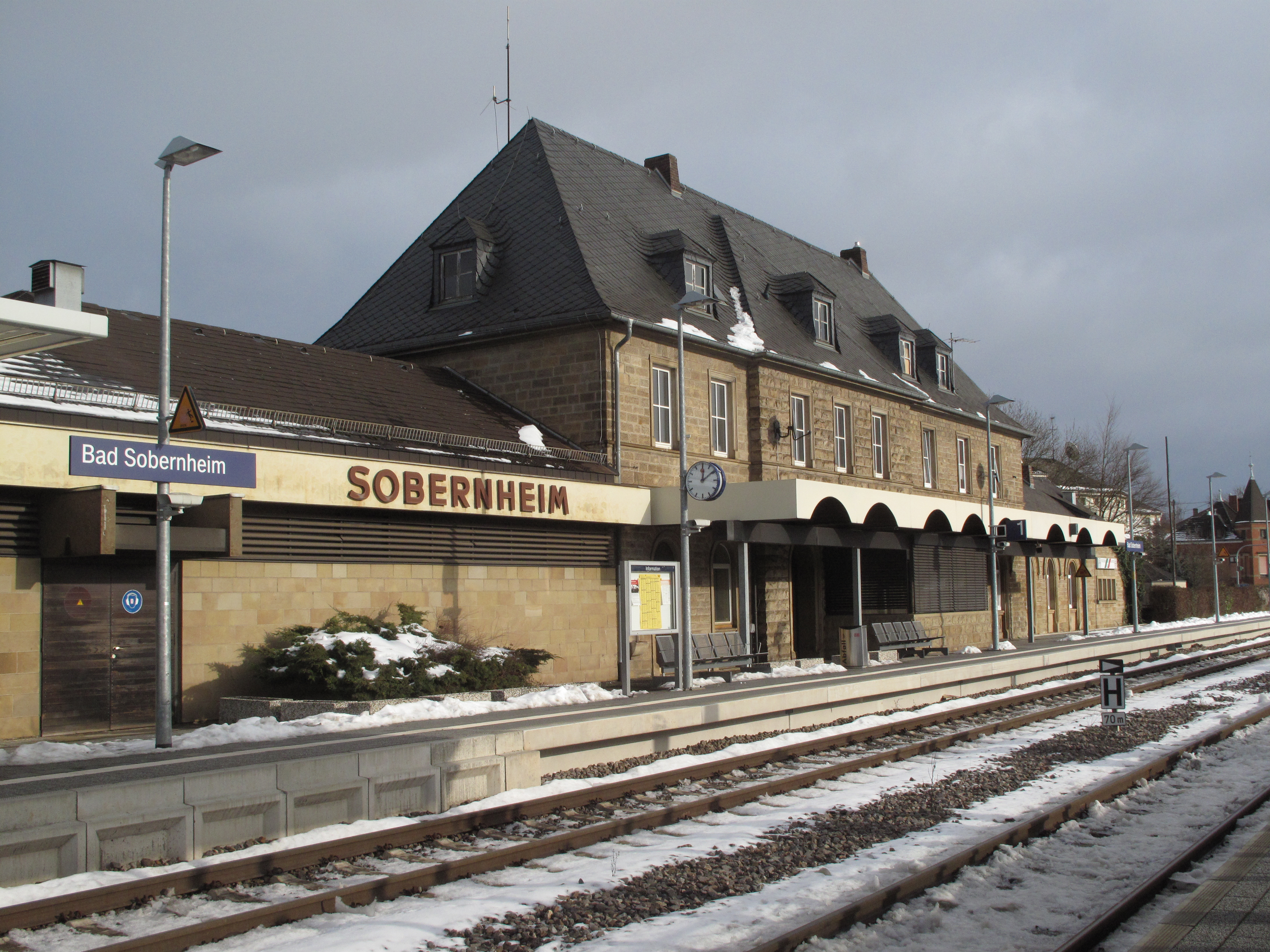
Bad Sobernheim Railway Station

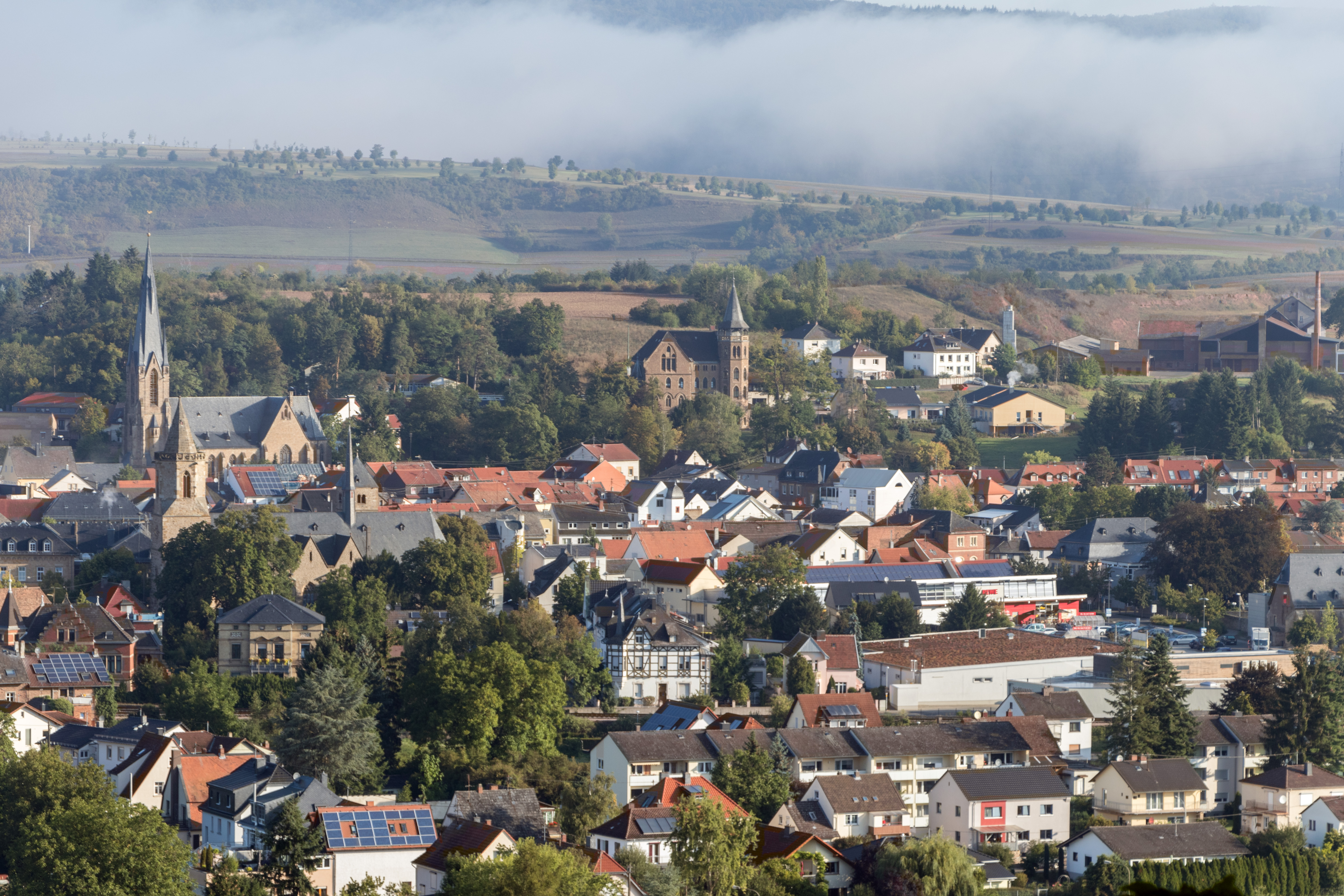
A view of Bad Sobernheim

The Verbandsgemeinde Bad Sobernheim consisted of the following Ortsgemeinden ("local municipalities"):

1. Auen
2. Bad Sobernheim
3. Bärweiler
4. Daubach
5. Ippenschied
6. Kirschroth
7. Langenthal
8. Lauschied
9. Martinstein
10. Meddersheim
11. Merxheim
12. Monzingen
13. Nußbaum
14. Odernheim am Glan
15. Rehbach
16. Seesbach
17. Staudernheim
18. Weiler bei Monzingen
19. Winterburg
