= Auen, Germany =

Auen
- Municipality
- Coat of arms

- Location of Auen within Bad Kreuznach district
- Interactive map of Auen
- Location within Germany Location within Rhineland-Palatinate
- Coordinates: 49°49′53″N 7°35′51″E
- Country: Germany
- State: Rhineland-Palatinate
- District: Bad Kreuznach
- Municipal assoc.: Nahe-Glan

Government
  - Mayor (2019–24): Torsten Baus

Area
  - Total: 2.71 km^{2} (1.05 sq mi)
- Elevation: 235 m (771 ft)

Population (2025-12-31)
  - Total: 190
  - Density: 70/km^{2} (180/sq mi)
- Time zone: UTC+01:00 (CET)
  - Summer (DST): UTC+02:00 (CEST)
- Postal codes: 55569
- Dialling codes: 06754
- Vehicle registration: KH
- Website: www.auen.de

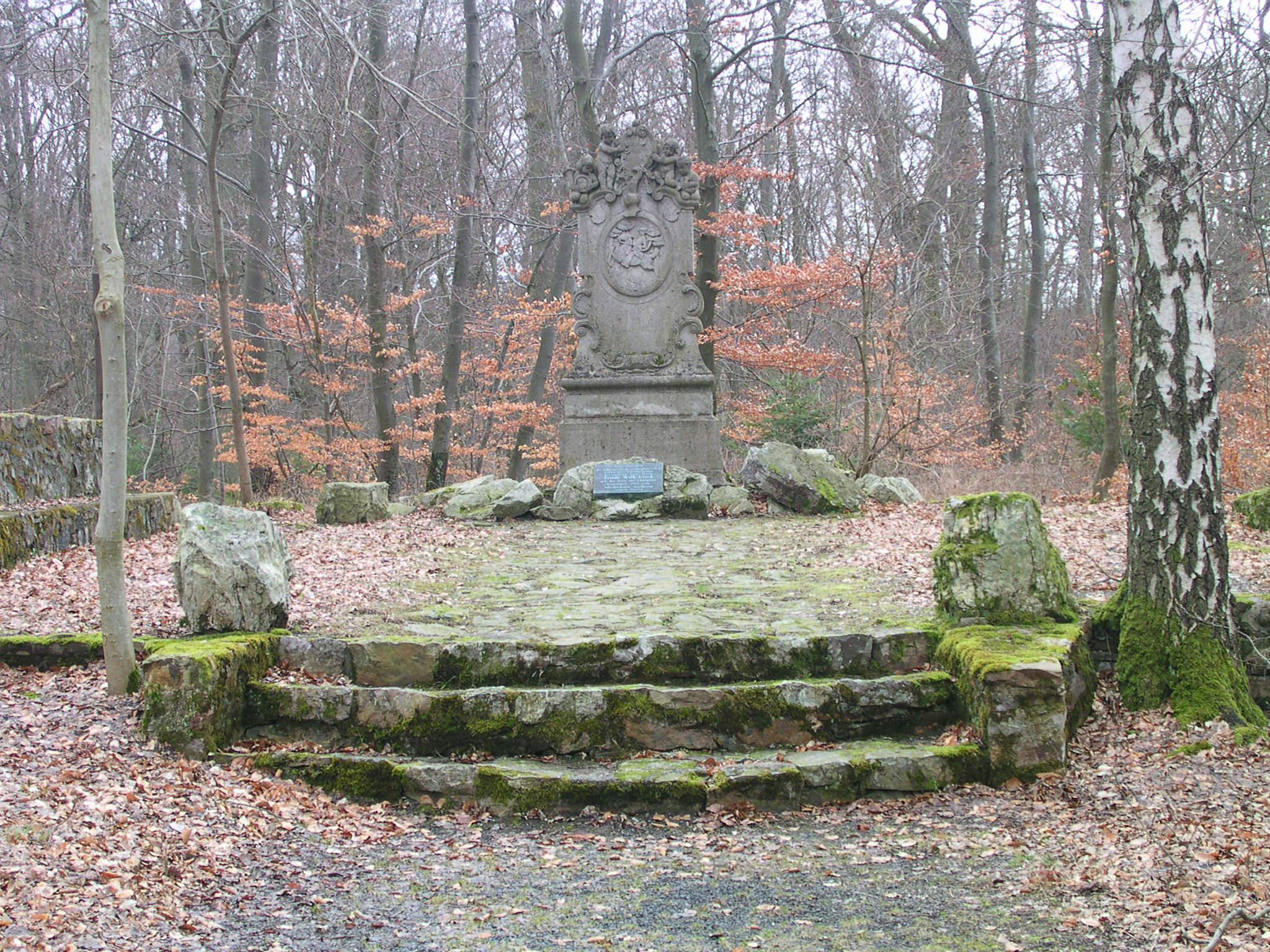
Denkmal an den Jäger aus Kurpfalz beim Forsthaus Entenpfuhl

Auen (German pronunciation: [ˈaʊən]) is an Ortsgemeinde – a municipality belonging to a Verbandsgemeinde, a kind of collective municipality – in the Bad Kreuznach district in Rhineland-Palatinate, Germany. It belongs to the Verbandsgemeinde Nahe-Glan, whose seat is in Bad Sobernheim. Auen is a tourism-oriented community and a state-recognized recreational area.

== Geography ==
=== Location ===
Auen lies in the southern Hunsrück between the Soonwald’s heights and the river Nahe. The municipal area measures 271 ha and the countryside is characterized by woodland and vineyards.

=== Neighbouring municipalities ===
Auen borders in the north on the town of Bad Sobernheim, in the south on the municipality of Monzingen and in the west on the municipality of Langenthal.

=== Constituent communities ===
Also belonging to Auen is the outlying homestead of Gosenhof.

=== Geology ===
It is rather easy even for those outside the field of geology to make out the geological composition in Auen and its outlying countryside. The Saar-Saale Depression runs almost down the middle of the Auener Tal (dale) from northeast to southwest, forming a clear boundary between the Rotliegend geology lying to the south and the Devonian geology lying to the north, which began in the framework of the Variscan orogeny and continued through the Pennsylvanian and into the Cisuralian. During this time, the depression was filled with thick sediments of terrestrial-limnic facies, which today can be seen as thrust sheets and streams. The bores (5 × 50 m deep) drilled to supply the municipal hall with geothermal heat showed the same mix of minerals. The groundwater that feeds the Kneipp wading basin in the village has a constant temperature in both summer and winter, with almost the same rate of flow, of 110 °C. There is no danger of volcanic eruption. The sandstone layers that formed in the Rotliegend were formerly important to employment in Auen. From the roughly eight sandstone quarries opened here, dressed stones and capitals were delivered to Cologne between 1842 and 1863 for cathedral building. Also unearthed at some of these quarries (Triftweg, Duschied, Bohnebruch) was petrified wood from the Permian. From the Devonian came fossilized plants here and there (Cordaitales leaves) and also small, fossilized creatures. These once existed in a collection, but this has unfortunately disappeared. A coal seam has also been observed north of Auen, but this has never been exploited because it is too thin to be commercially recoverable.

== History ==
=== Archaeology ===
Auen was until after the Second World War a blank on the map of archaeological finds in the Bad Kreuznach district. A few find sites were already known, but there were still no digs or listings available. Through constant observation and subsequent digs, however, 22 find sites have now been identified. All digs were carried out under supervision of the Office for the Care of Buried Monuments (Amt für Bodendenkmalpflege) in Mainz. Listed here are some of the finds that have been brought to light in Auen, or locations where finds have turned up:

- Stone hatchets and ceramics from roughly 3500 to 2000 BC
- Two burnt-out wooden wells from Celtic times
- Millstone from Celtic times
- Grape seeds, wheat and barley corns from La Tène times
- Great clay vessel from Hallstatt times
- Finds near Saint Willigis’s Chapel from Gallo-Roman times
- Four Roman watermains
- Top of a Roman amphora
- Roman house with sewerpipe
- Roman coin from roughly AD 200
- Various places with Roman potsherds
- Ivory cross from roughly 1300
- Two places with Roman vessels
- Eight sandstone quarries
- Two limekilns
- One coal pit and further prospecting

=== Middle Ages ===
Auen's history, which is marked by an unusual wealth of documentary material for a place of its size, thus seeming almost exaggerated, can be explained by the village's time as a landhold of Sponheim Abbey and Saint Willigis’s Chapel’s time as a landhold of Disibodenberg Abbey. The formerly held assumption that Auen arose in the time of the Frankish taking of the land about AD 900 no longer bears up against the latest knowledge that has come to light. Archaeological finds now show that there had been human habitation here, some of it permanent, in earlier times. Furthermore, all digs undertaken at Roman sites have yielded Celtic finds as well, leading to the conclusion that the dale was settled as far back as the New Stone Age. In 1128, Auen had its first documentary mention in a confirmation document issued by Archbishop Adalbert of Mainz in connection with the building of Saint Willigis's Chapel, itself having been mentioned about 980 or 990. As early as 1044 and 1048, the village was listed in donation documents from Count Eberhard of Sponheim kept at the church at Sponheim (in Auen, the landhold in question amounted to four Huben). In 1203, Auen, along with its land and people, was donated as a payment to Sponheim Abbey, as the abbot had kept such good watch over the County of Sponheim during the Count's crusade. Auen's long allegiance to Sponheim Abbey is confirmed by the 1488 Auener Weistum (a Weistum – cognate with English wisdom – was a legal pronouncement issued by men learned in law in the Middle Ages and early modern times) and by Abbot Johannes Trithemius’s homage about 1500; it might have lasted until 1570.

=== Modern times ===
This allegiance brought Auen into the Oberamt of Kreuznach. This was mentioned in a 1601 description of the Amt, which said that, among other things, the lordship of Sponheim Abbey and the outlying village of Auen both belonged to the Oberamt of Kreuznach. By this time, Auen was already an exclave between the other Ämter. Also mentioned was that Auen lay within the range of the Amt of Böckelheim but was nonetheless otherwise strictly subject to the Oberamt of Kreuznach. At the same time, the inhabitants of Auen were subject ecclesiastically to the parish of Geh in Kirche, which was in turn subject to Disibodenberg Abbey. This arrangement worked out quite well for the inhabitants of Auen. About 1550, the Reformation was introduced. The last priest left the parish of Getzbach and became the first Protestant minister in Pferdsfeld (a now vanished village). In 1575, the Getzbacher Wald (forest) was sold, thus stripping Auen of lands that had hitherto reached up to the Hummerstuhl, which amounted to almost half the municipal area. In 1707, Auen passed to Electoral Palatinate while remaining in the Oberamt of Kreuznach until Napoleonic times.

==== Recent times ====
After belonging for some years under French rule to the Mairie (“Mayoralty”) of Monzingen, Auen passed under the terms of the Congress of Vienna in 1815 to the Prussian Amt of Monzingen, which governed it for 154 years. Although Auen is a very old village, it was only in the 19th century that it blossomed into one of the Nahe region's agricultural and winegrowing hubs. The planting of vineyards promised a good secondary income earner, although a grape seed from about 1500 BC had already been found in the municipality along with some grain. The stonemason's craft, too, flourished at the quarries around Auen. In the mid 19th century, finished capitals and stones were delivered from these to Cologne Cathedral. Thirty-nine small farms grew what was needed. New farm lanes that afforded readier access were laid to make farmwork easier. A few farmers received certificates about 1900 for good yields. Beginning in 1770, 31 inhabitants emigrated. Out of 180 inhabitants, eight fell in the First World War and two went missing in action. In the Second World War, of the 56 soldiers from Auen, 23 fell and 4 went missing. In the course of the 1969 administrative restructuring in Rhineland-Palatinate, Auen was grouped into the Verbandsgemeinde of Bad Sobernheim. In 1993, the Auener Chronik, the village chronicle, was published. In recent years, Auen has grown into a residential community fit for tourism that has still not lost its rustic character.

=== Municipality’s name ===
Auen is a placename that describes a settlement or a homestead. Only beginning in the mid 18th century did the current spelling “Auen” establish itself as the customary one. In Modern High German, the name literally means “floodplains” or “riverside flats”, and indeed this would seem to be its derivation. Thus it is Germanic, but from Celtic dhwö, from Proto-Indo-European akua (“water”), a(z)wjö (“island”). It is akin to the Latin aqua (“water”) and the Old High German auw(i)a (“land at, in or near water”). Over the ages, Auen has borne the following names:

- 1047: Auwen
- 1124: Auwen
- 1488: dorff Awen
- 1588: Awen
- 1601: Dörflein Awen
- 1720: Gemeind Awen
- 1731: Auwen
- 1758: Auen
- 1761: Auen

=== Population development ===
Auen has always been a small village that has never emerged from the shadows. In 1437/1438, the village's population was recorded as 8 hearths (for which read “households”). Between 1580 and 1600, there were 81 inhabitants living at 18 hearths, and in 1808 there were 152 inhabitants in Auen. The table shows Auen's population development since Napoleonic times. The figures in the table from 1871 to 1987 are based on censuses:

Year	Inhabitants
1815	178
1835	249
1871	267
1905	220
1939	193

Year	Inhabitants
1950	211
1961	203
1970	220
1987	227
2005	239

== Religion ==
As at 31 August 2013, there are 193 full-time residents in Auen, and of those, 96 are Evangelical (49.741%), 55 are Catholic (28.497%), 3 (1.554%) belong to other religious groups and 39 (20.207%) either have no religion or will not reveal their religious affiliation.

== Politics ==
=== Municipal council ===
The council is made up of 6 council members, who were elected by majority vote at the municipal election held on 7 June 2009, and the honorary mayor as chairman.

=== Mayor ===
Auen's mayor is Torsten Baus.

=== Coat of arms ===
The German blazon reads: Schild durch silbernen Schrägbalken geteilt, der mit einem Schwarzen A belegt ist. Oben blau-goldenes Schach, unten in Blau eine goldene Abtskrümme.

The municipality's arms might in English heraldic language be described thus: A bend argent charged with the letter A sable between chequy of twelve azure and Or and azure an abbot's staff bendwise couped in base of the fourth.

The bend (slanted stripe) with the letter A – for “Auen”, of course – goes back to a court seal from 1731. The charge below this, the abbot's staff, refers to Archbishop Bardo of Mainz, who in 1044 listed, among other places, Auen in a donation document. The “chequy” pattern recalls the County of Sponheim, to which Auen belonged until the late 18th century.

== Culture and sightseeing ==
=== Buildings ===
The following are listed buildings or sites in Rhineland-Palatinate’s Directory of Cultural Monuments:

- Hauptstraße 2 – house, Late Classicist sandstone-block building, about 1850
- Zur Feuchten Ecke 1 – former school, town hall; Late Classicist sandstone-block building, about 1850
- In the forest – Saint Willigis’s Catholic Chapel (St. Willigiskapelle), formerly “Go-To-Church” (Geh-in-Kirche); quire of Romanesque church, converted to Early Gothic, which had been in ruins since the 17th century, but reconstructed in 1912

==== Saint Willigis’s Chapel ====
The Chapel was formerly known as the Geh in Kirche or the Getzbach/Götzbach Kirche. Archbishop and Chancellor Willigis from Mainz saw on his inspectional and informational journeys through his rather vast and extensive region that there was already good and eager religious activity, yet there was also a certain lack of gathering places such as churches and other centres of worship to shore up and foster the consolidation of Christian life, especially in outlying areas. On the river Nahe at the bigger centres, the odd church could already be found, but of course, these were simply not enough to serve all believers. It is clear that wherever the former monastery could draw income, there rose, too, the first churches, as in Meckenbach, Hundsbach and Bollenbach. Disibodenberg Abbey, which had risen once again, and which is said to have been Willigis's favourite monastery, was richly furnished with estates, income and tithes. It was up to the canons to spread their influence out from this hub, and thus every thread of their dealings now ran from their monastic seat. In the wild and untamed outlands of the Soon, no income from the old monastic landholds was forthcoming that Willigis could have used. He therefore sought a suitable place, finding it within the limits of the old royal estate of Monzingen, near the village of Auen, owned by a cleric named Wizelin. From this secular priest, Willigis bought an oxgang of land, which he must have found very convenient. In the 1128 document that first mentions Auen, the text does not go into church buildings on the newly acquired lot. It does, however, make clear that there was such a sale. It can be assumed, indeed it is likely, that Willigis found that there were still buildings or ruins on the land from Roman times and he thus had no great difficulty building a church. Furthermore, there were quarries right nearby. It is known today that these buildings that the archbishop would have found here would have been of Roman origin. Perhaps, too, in this outlying area, they had survived the upheavals of the intervening time and had not sustained any serious damage. New knowledge came to light at the time of the renovation in 1978-1979, which yielded rich, informative finds that left no doubt but that the existing foundations are partly of Roman origin. It seems clear that even Willigis would have had qualms about coming to this forsaken land to build a church when even by the 16th century, records were still being made about how dangerous it was there for clergymen on their way to services. Willigis, so the story goes, consecrated this church in which he had put such great hope and named it Geh-in-Kirche (or Gehinkirche, but either way, meaning “Go-To-Church”) as an everlasting reminder to attend church assiduously, wanting as he did to deepen the Soonwald people's understanding of Christian teaching (it should perhaps be pointed out that the verb form, Geh, is in the imperative mood). On the other hand, differing opinions have it that this name is not original, but rather that it came from the local dialect, somehow linked to the name Getzbach or Götzbach, as the local brook was called. Anyone from outside or who was otherwise unfamiliar with the area would not quite gather anything meaningful from either of those names when applied to a church, for a name ending in —bach (“brook”), while it might suit a village or a homestead – and would certainly suit a brook – did not quite go with a church. Whatever the old name's genesis was, when the chapel was reconstructed early in the 20th century – by which time it had fallen into ruin – it was realized in 1913 that no church had ever been consecrated to Willigis (it is true, though, that although he is often called “Saint Willigis”, he has never actually been canonized). So, the two Catholic dioceses concerned, Trier and Mainz, agreed to give the chapel its new name: Willigis-Kapelle (Saint Willigis's Chapel), after its builder. The new name, if it can still be called “new” after more than a century, is of the three names mentioned here still not the most widely used, which goes to show that new names do not always quickly sweep old ones away. “Getzbach”, despite any confusion that it may have caused earlier, is still the preferred name for the chapel among locals (“Ich gehe auf die Getzbach” – “I’m going to the Getzbach”). The new and thus far only church was the hub of a great spiritual guidance area that stretched far across the Soonwald, all the way to Gehlweiler, taking in the centres of not only Auen and Gehlweiler but also Daubach, Eckweiler (forsaken in the late 20th century), Pferdsfeld (likewise), Winterburg, Ippenschied, Seesbach, Kellenbach and further places that later vanished. Churchgoers had to walk for hours to reach the chapel for services. The dead were buried at the church, too. There was a lichway (a path along which the dead were taken to the church and/or graveyard) running from the Soon to the church. The church soon became too small and Willigis had another church built near Seesbach, the Sementis-Kapelle. It had been assumed that the church stood alone, away from the village of Auen. However, given what was found during excavations for the retention basin, which brought to light ample material, it is now believed that a few houses and buildings stood on the other side of the brook. This is also seen in the water supply for the Kneipp wading basin that formerly served people over there. Many documents are on hand dealing with the chapel's history. A timeline has been constructed out of some of them here:

- 1128 — Founding of the Geh in Kirche
- 1259 — Archbishop Gerhard reserves the right to appoint the parish priest
- 1273 — Sir Philipp, called Paffe, forgoes tithes
- 1339 — Foundation of the Mass
- 1400 — Willigis's building supposedly burns down; reconstructed with nave in the Gothic style
- 1501 — Synodic Weistum
- 1515 — Synodic court
- 1552 — Last priest, Venter, departs (Reformation); becomes first Reformed pastor in Pferdsfeld, after selling everything off with the Schultheiß of Auen
- 1560 — Reformation is introduced
- 1564 — Niklas von Schmittburg has the right to appoint the pastor and is “collator”
- 1568 — Parish seat is moved to Eckweiler when the rectory burns down
- 1602 — Complaint about the church building's bad condition
- 1608 — Church is on the point of collapse
- 1630 — Reconstruction or renovation
- 1685 — Copies of the 1501 Weistum by Gehlweiler, which instigated secession

In the graveyard, people from Eckweiler, Daubach, Auen and the Soonwald were henceforth also buried. Now and then, a funeral sermon was still delivered in the ruin, as it was for Friedrich Wilhelm Utsch (“the Hunter from Electoral Palatinate”), as was a yearly sermon. The church, however, kept on falling further into disrepair. People removing the stone for their own building projects also did not help. A listing from 1876 gives a clear indication of how heavy the damage to the church was, and slowly, efforts arose to reconstruct it once again. In a relatively short time, this was finally done and the church was consecrated on 15 September 1912. The building work proceeded without much care taken as to old relics, and certainly a certain amount of destruction of important things resulted. Now, though, there were once more weekly services, weddings, christenings and burials. Through both world wars, little importance was placed on maintaining the building, and so considerable disrepair began to show up once more. In 1977 and 1979, a general overhaul by the parish of Rehbach and make-work measures were carried out. During this work, finds from early history were made, some of them important, including proof that the church stood on Roman foundations; even Celtic material was unearthed. At the Priorhof (Bad Sobernheim’s town museum) an exhibit of the most important finds is on loan. Lying buried at the little forest graveyard are Friedrich Wilhelm Utsch, called “the Hunter from Electoral Palatinate”, and his wife and two children.

==== Evangelical church ====
The Lapis Primarius (“Foundation Stone”) Evangelical church has an end window by Röhrig/Bensberg

=== Clubs ===
The following clubs are active in Auen:

- Feuerwehr — fire brigade
- Landfrauen — countrywomen's club
- Verschönerungsverein — beautification club

== Economy and infrastructure ==
=== Economic structure ===
Auen has a small balneotherapeutic facility where one can “take the waters”, although visitors do not drink the water, but rather wade through it. It is a Kneipp facility, complete with a wading basin. Auen also has a number of inns offering the local wine and home-style cooking. There are also private lodging providers.

=== Transport ===
To the south runs Bundesstraße 41. Serving nearby Monzingen is a railway station on the Nahe Valley Railway (Bingen–Saarbrücken).
