= Bockenau =

- Municipality
- Coat of arms

- Location of Bockenau within Bad Kreuznach district
- Interactive map of Bockenau
- Location within Germany Location within Rhineland-Palatinate
- Coordinates: 49°50′12″N 7°40′46″E
- Country: Germany
- State: Rhineland-Palatinate
- District: Bad Kreuznach
- Municipal assoc.: Rüdesheim

Government
  - Mayor (2019–24): Jürgen Klotz

Area
  - Total: 9.66 km^{2} (3.73 sq mi)
- Elevation: 250 m (820 ft)

Population (2025-12-31)
  - Total: 1,175
  - Density: 122/km^{2} (315/sq mi)
- Time zone: UTC+01:00 (CET)
  - Summer (DST): UTC+02:00 (CEST)
- Postal codes: 55595
- Dialling codes: 06758
- Vehicle registration: KH
- Website: www.bockenau.de

Bockenau is an Ortsgemeinde – a municipality belonging to a Verbandsgemeinde, a kind of collective municipality – in the Bad Kreuznach district in Rhineland-Palatinate, Germany. It belongs to the Verbandsgemeinde of Rüdesheim, whose seat is in the municipality of Rüdesheim an der Nahe. Bockenau is a state-recognized tourism centre.

== Geography ==
=== Location ===
Bockenau lies at the south edge of the Hunsrück in the Ellerbach valley at the 380 m-high Wingertsberg and is enclosed by the Soonwald foothills, whose highest elevation is the Ellerspring at 657 m above sea level, which is also where the Ellerbach, which passes through Bockenau, rises. The village thus lies geographically in the scenically interesting and to a great extent untouched Gauchswald (forest). As a whole, the countryside is known as the Bockenauer Schweiz ("Bockenau Switzerland"), as reflected in the name borne by the village's sport and event centre. The municipal area measures 9.66 km^{2}.

=== Neighbouring municipalities ===
Clockwise from the north, Bockenau's neighbours are the municipality of Allenfeld, the municipality of Sponheim, the municipality of Burgsponheim, the municipality of Waldböckelheim, the municipality of Nußbaum, the municipality of Daubach, the municipality of Rehbach and the municipality of Winterburg.

=== Constituent communities ===
Also belonging to Bockenau is the outlying homestead of Lindenhof.

== History ==
Beginning no later than the 12th century, Bockenau belonged to the County of Sponheim and was thereby one of its oldest landholds, and therefore lies today on the Sponheimer Weg, an historically thematized hiking trail. Nevertheless, the village's origins actually go much further back. When the new building zone "In der Bein" was opened, foundations of a Roman villa rustica from the 3rd century AD were found. This was proved by the coins that were also unearthed. On the lands of the campground called Bockenauer Schweiz, lying within municipal limits, and the settlement of Daubacher Brücke (between Winterburg and Bockenau) once lay, in the Middle Ages, Nunkirchen, a homestead with a church that was owned by Jutta von Sponheim.

=== Population development ===
Bockenau's population development since Napoleonic times is shown in the table below. The figures for the years from 1871 to 1987 are drawn from census data.

Historical population

Year	Pop.	±%
1815	567	—
1835	842	+48.5%
1871	938	+11.4%
1905	1,005	+7.1%
1939	836	−16.8%

Year	Pop.	±%
1950	1,016	+21.5%
1961	1,003	−1.3%
1970	1,058	+5.5%
1987	1,117	+5.6%
2005	1,252	+12.1%

== Religion ==
As at 31 August 2013, there are 1,241 full-time residents in Bockenau, and of those, 536 are Evangelical (43.191%), 477 are Catholic (38.437%), 2 are Greek Orthodox (0.161%), 32 (2.579%) belong to other religious groups and 194 (15.633%) either have no religion or will not reveal their religious affiliation.

== Politics ==
=== Municipal council ===
The council is made up of 16 council members, who were elected by majority vote at the municipal election held on 7 June 2009, and the honorary mayor as chairman.

=== Mayor ===
Bockenau's mayor is Jürgen Klotz, and his deputies are Rolf Stangenberg and Manfred Hay.

== Culture and sightseeing ==
=== Buildings ===
The following are listed buildings or sites in Rhineland-Palatinate's Directory of Cultural Monuments:

- Evangelical parish church, Winterburger Straße 21 – Baroque aisleless church, marked 1748; west tower, District Master Builder Ludwig Behr
- Saint Lawrence's Catholic Church (Kirche St. Laurentius), Waldböckelheimer Straße 9 – Romanesquified aisleless church, 1905; at the church sandstone Crucifix, marked 1892
- Lindenstraße 2 – Baroque timber-frame house, partly solid, 18th century
- Mainzer Straße – former bakehouse; Classicized rusticated building, 1923
- Waldböckelheimer Straße, at the graveyard – arcade hall with soldier figure, 1923
- At Winterburger Straße 3 – spolia, former keystone, 18th century
- Winterburger Straße 12 – so-called Haus Hay; timber-frame house, partly solid, partly slated, about 1900
- Winterburger Straße 15 – town hall; Historicized plastered building with former fire equipment room, marked 1846
- Winterburger Straße 21 – Evangelical rectory, Late Baroque building with half-hip roof, marked 1766
- Winterburger Straße 23 – Baroque timber-frame house, partly solid, 18th century
- Near Winterburger Straße 25 – Late Gründerzeit sandstone Crucifix, marked 1903
- Winterburger Straße 34/36 – villalike Late Classicist house (former Catholic school), about 1880
- Winterburger Straße 38/40 – former Evangelical school; Late Classicist plastered building, about 1830/1840
- Signpost, on Landesstraße 237 – Classicist sandstone obelisk, about 1820
- Signpost, at Landesstraße 238/Kreisstraße 23 – Classicist sandstone obelisk, about 1820
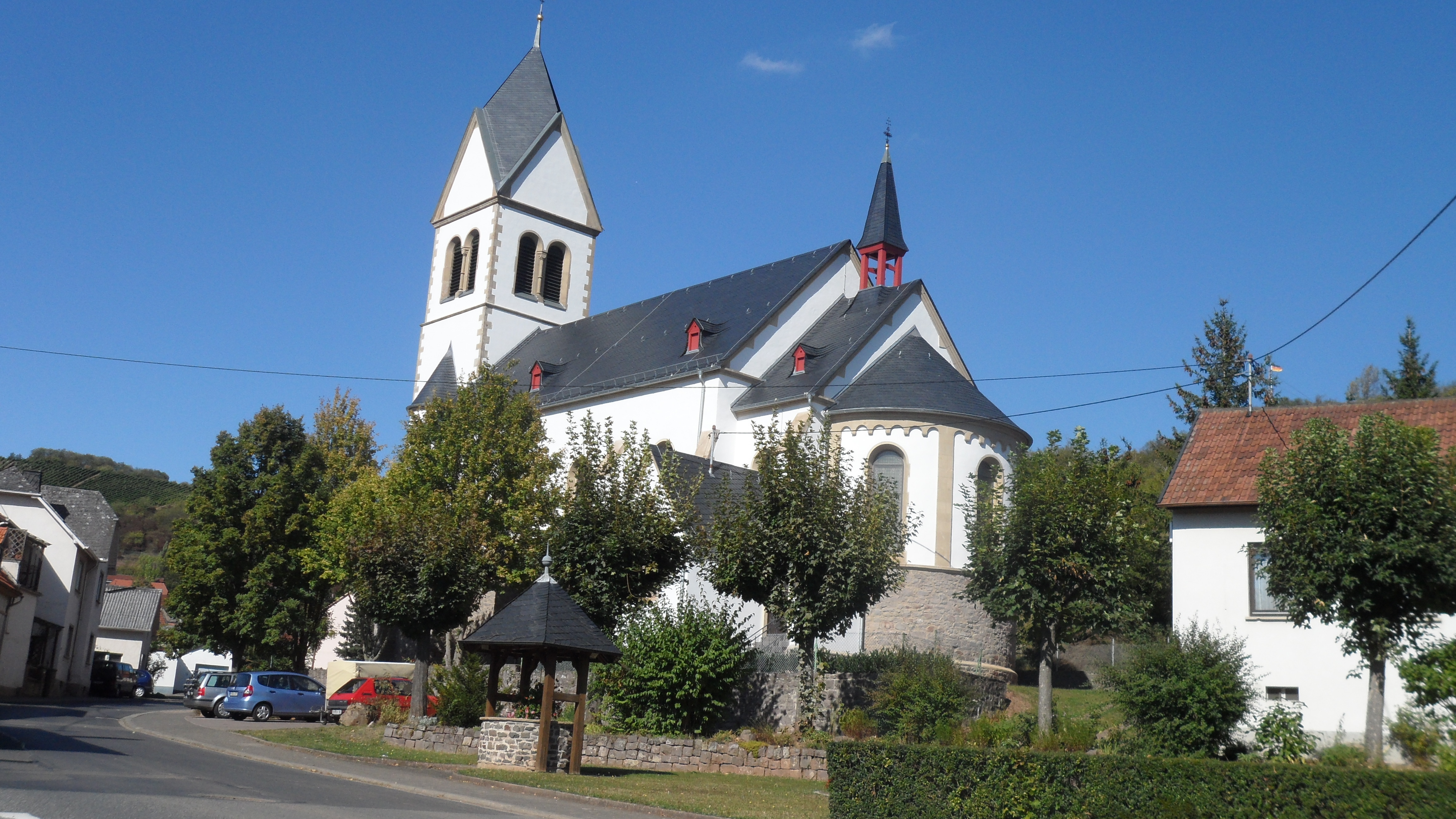
Saint Lawrence's Catholic Church

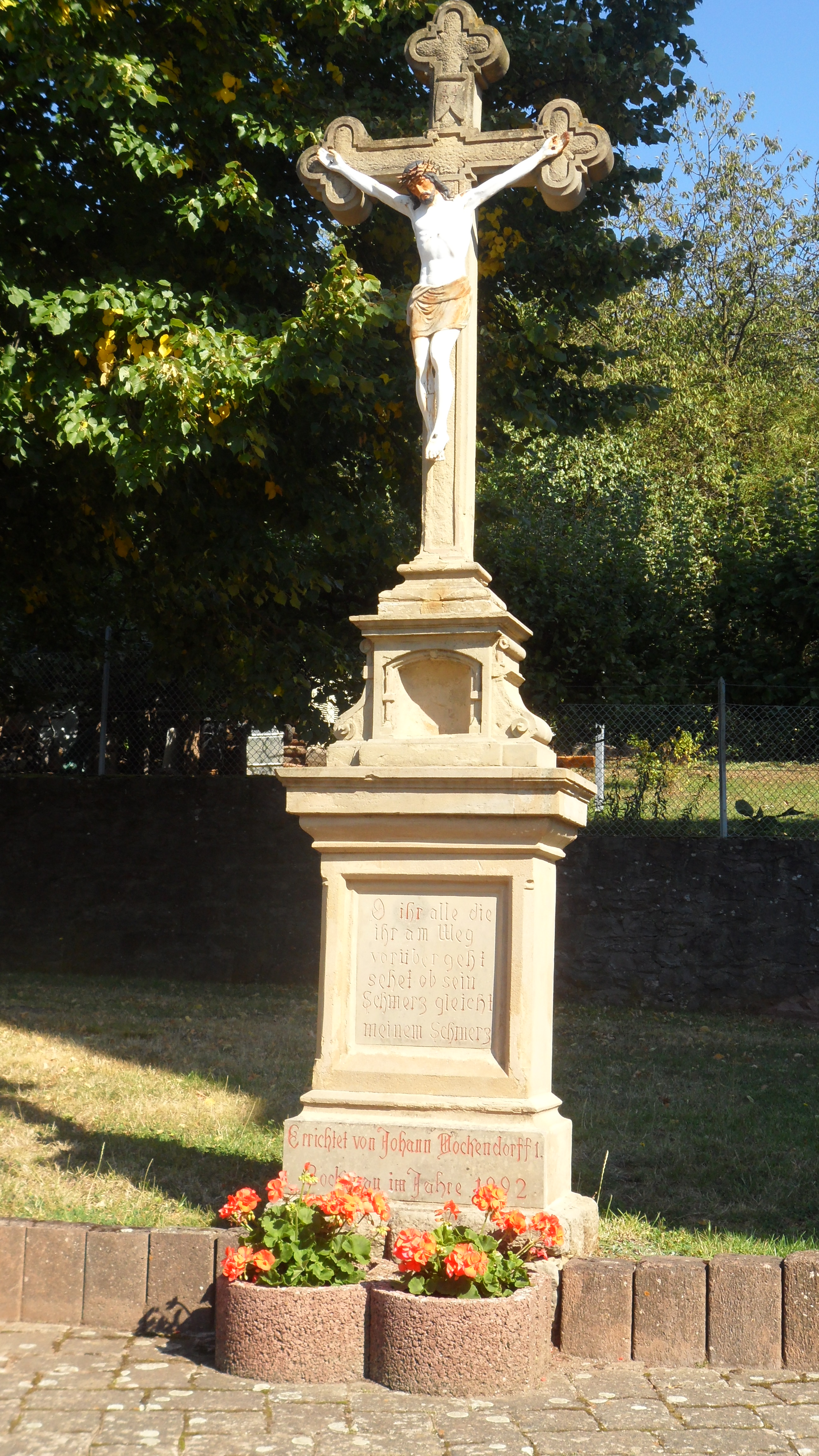
Sandstone Crucifix at the Catholic church

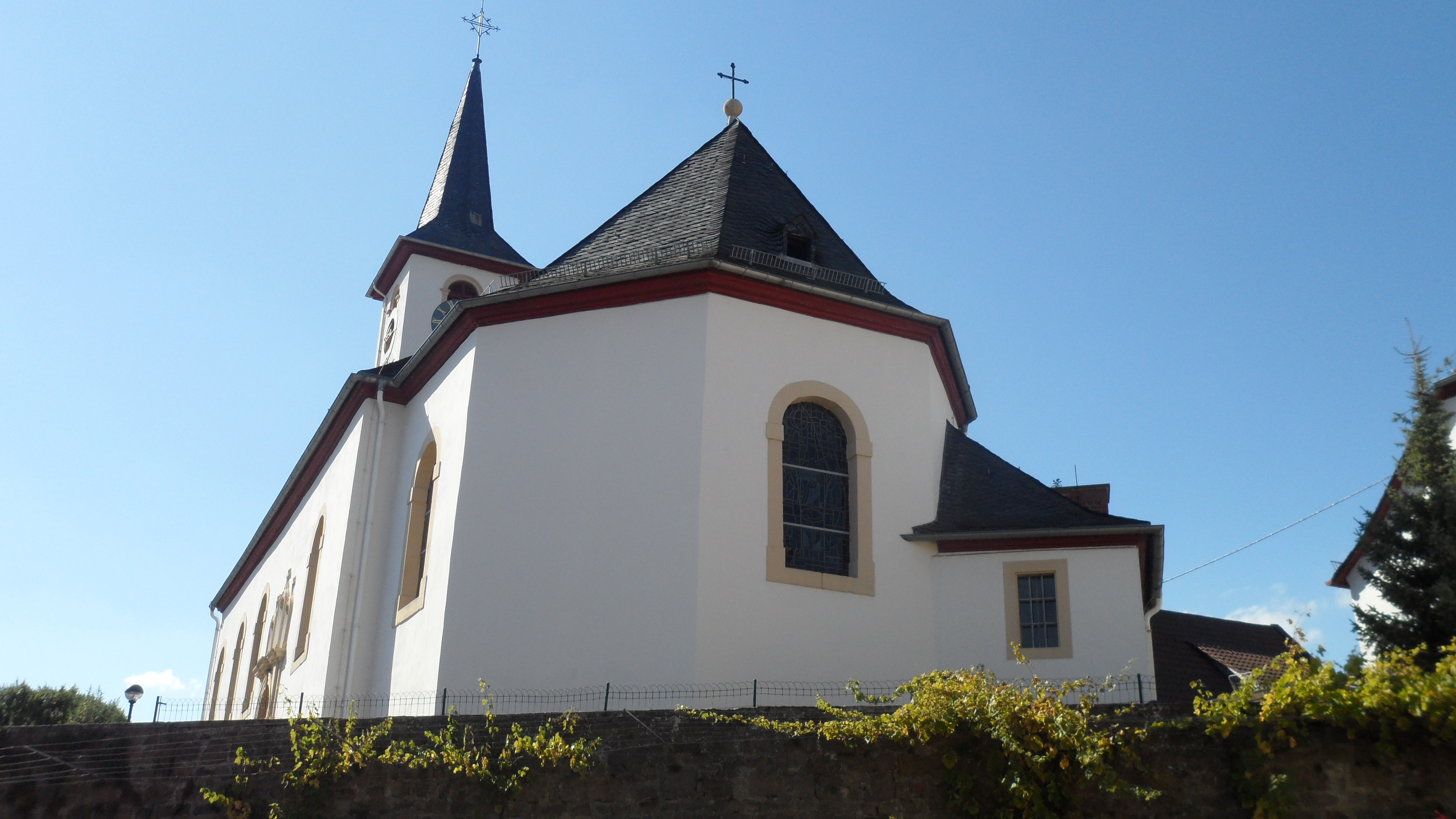
Evangelical parish church

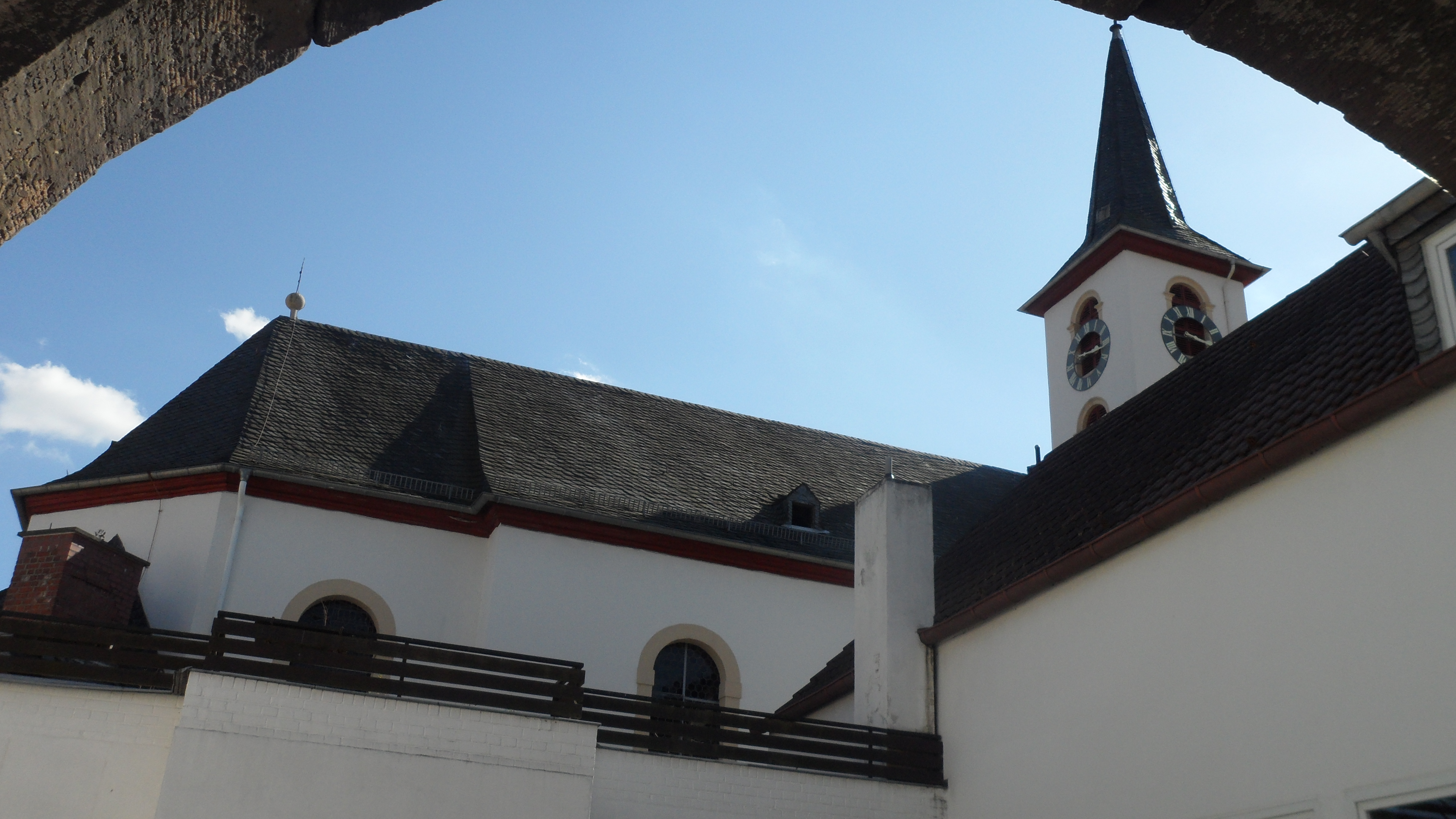
Evangelical parish church

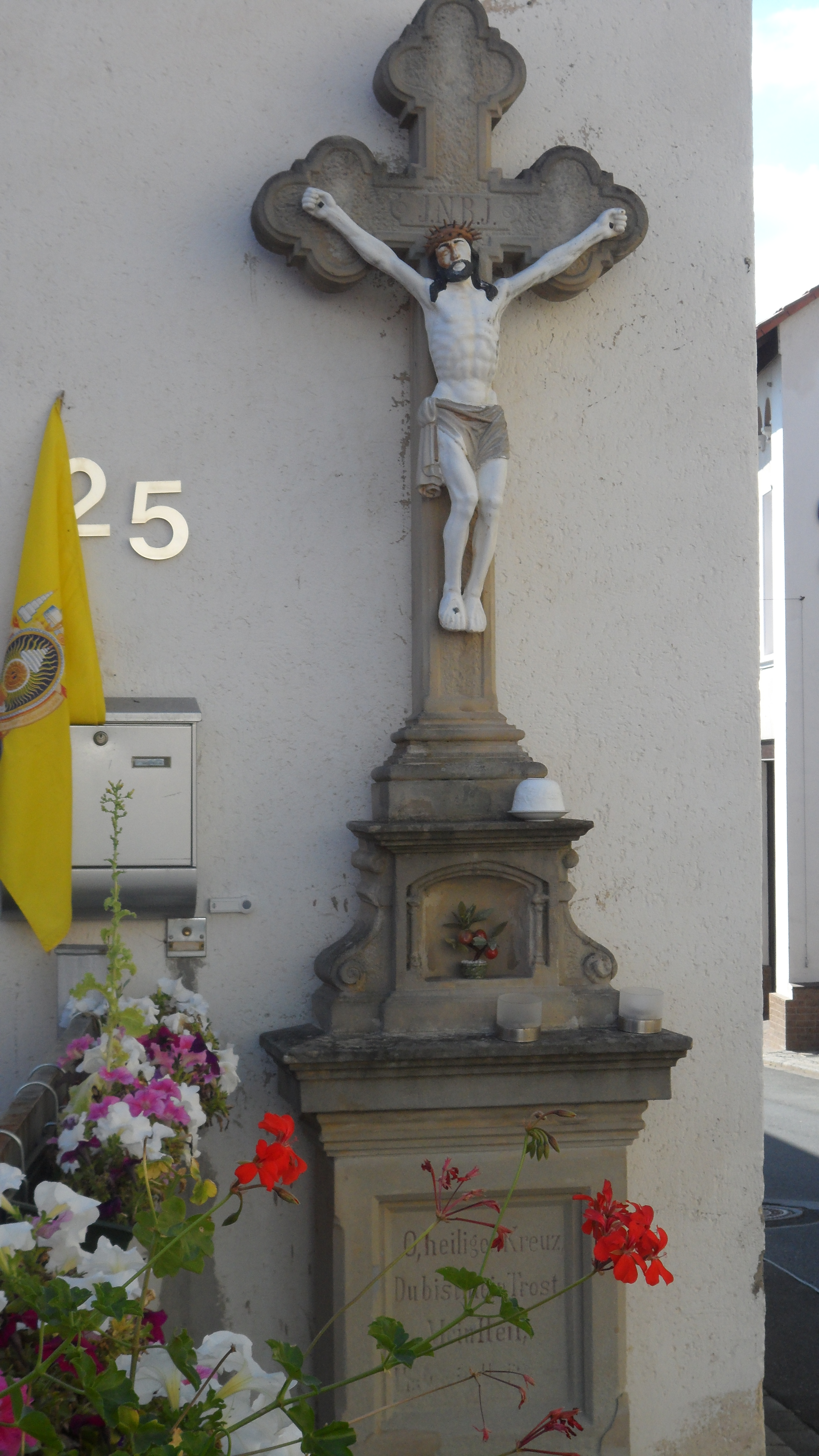
Late Gründerzeit sandstone Crucifix, 1903

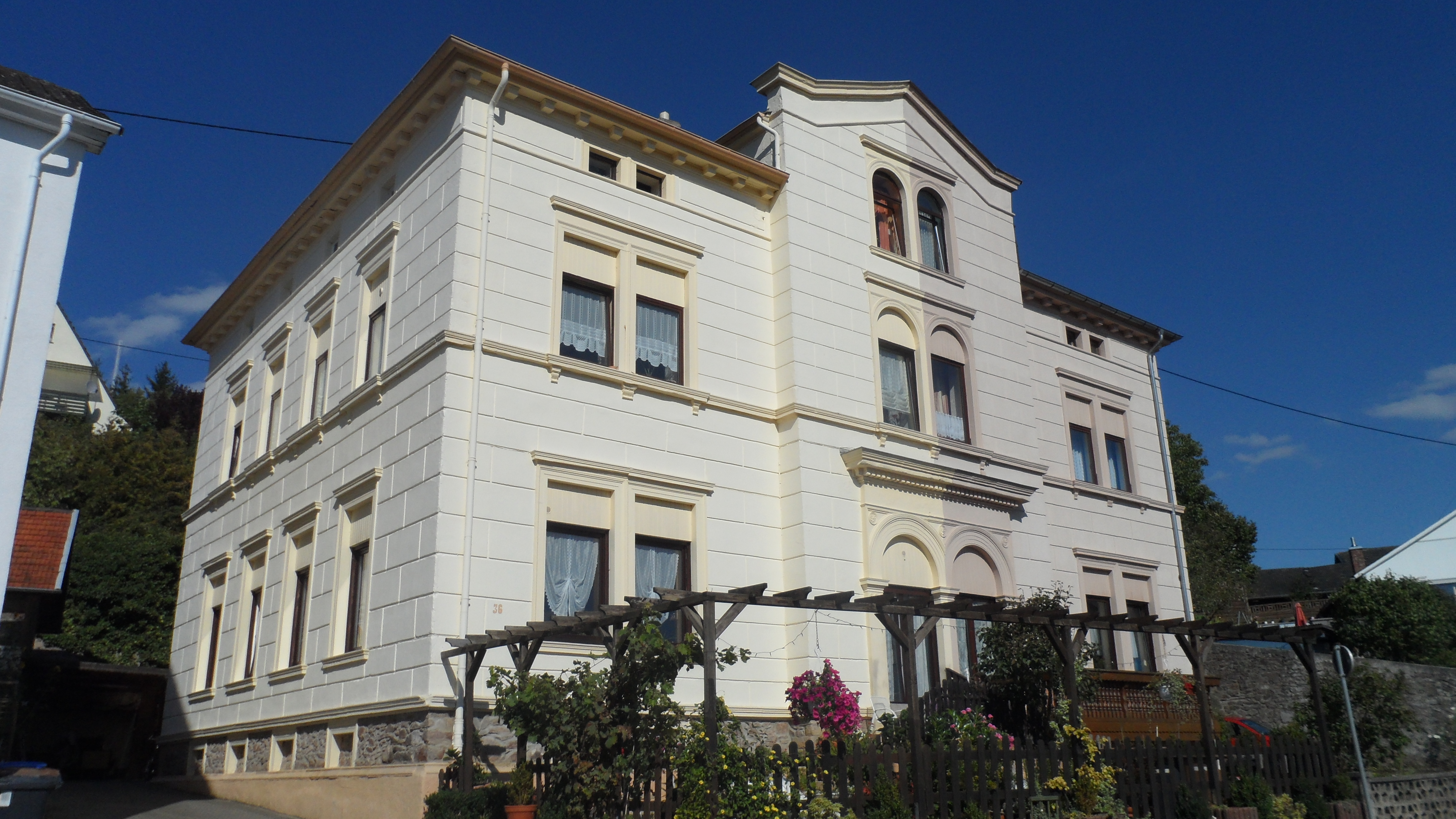
Former Catholic school, about 1880

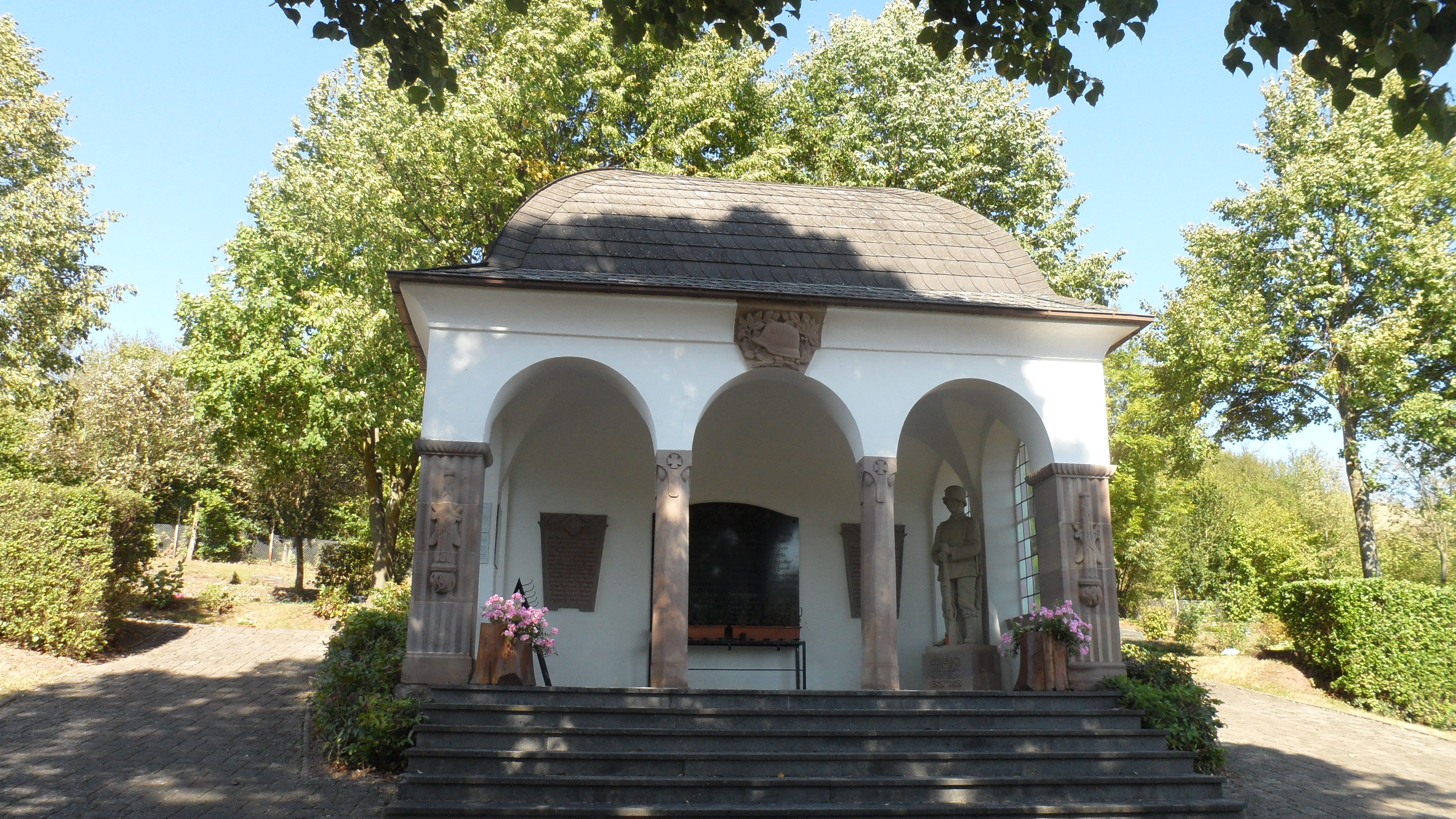
Waldböckelheimer Straße, at the graveyard: arcade hall

=== Clubs ===
Bockenau has an active club life manifested mainly at the new Bockenauer Schweiz Halle.

=== Museums ===
On the way out of the village to the south is found an open-air Kleinbahn museum. Visitors can discover – and even climb – two Krauss-Maffei narrow-gauge steam locomotives, one of them of the type ÖBB 998, together with a restored coach and a typical guard's hut with a great signal tree from the same time period. The Kreuznacher Kleinbahn ran from 1896 to 1936 between Winterburg and Bad Kreuznach.

== Economy and infrastructure ==
=== Winegrowing ===
Known countrywide is the 12.5 ha Schäfer-Fröhlich winery, which belongs to the Verband Deutscher Prädikatsweingüter (VDP).

=== Education ===
Bockenau has one primary school.

=== Transport ===
Running to Bockenau's south is Bundesstraße 41, which since 2008 has been a four-lane highway. Serving the neighbouring town of Bad Sobernheim is a railway station on the Nahe Valley Railway (Bingen–Saarbrücken) with direct service without transfer to Frankfurt am Main by Regional-Express train. Five kilometres to the northwest lies the disused Pferdsfeld military airfield, while 35 km farther on in that same direction is found Frankfurt-Hahn Airport.

== Famous people ==
=== Sons and daughters of the town ===
- Johann Friedrich Abegg (22 May 1761 – 8 August 1840 in Bremen), salesman and senator in Bremen
- Rudolf Desch (1 August 1911 – 15 February 1997 in Bad Sobernheim), composer and professor
