= Ippenschied =

- Municipality
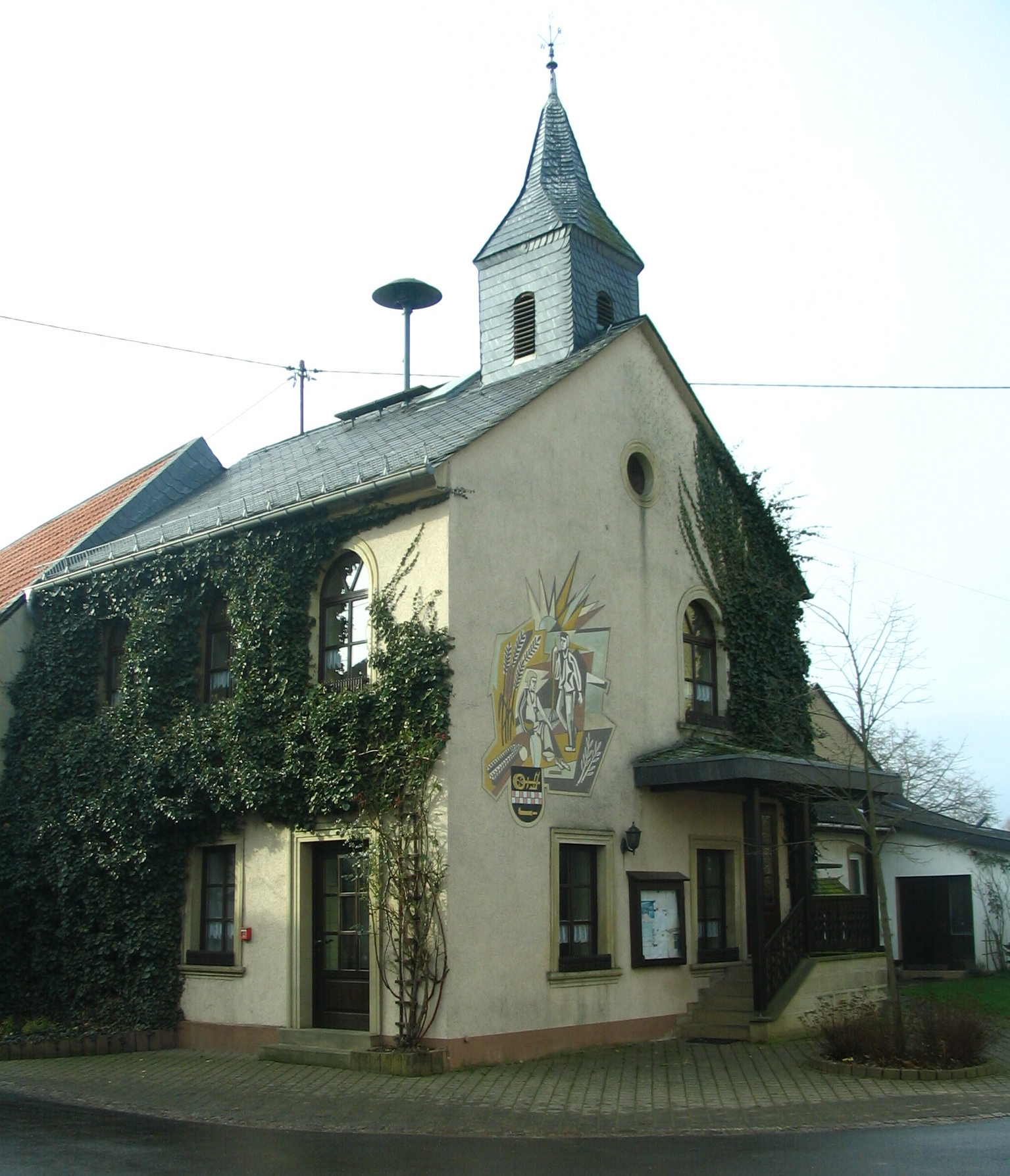
- Municipal hall in Ippenschied

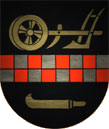
- Coat of arms

- Location of Ippenschied within Bad Kreuznach district
- Interactive map of Ippenschied
- Location within Germany Location within Rhineland-Palatinate
- Coordinates: 49°52′05″N 7°37′57″E
- Country: Germany
- State: Rhineland-Palatinate
- District: Bad Kreuznach
- Municipal assoc.: Nahe-Glan

Government
  - Mayor (2019–24): Reinhard Koch

Area
  - Total: 2.62 km^{2} (1.01 sq mi)
- Elevation: 365 m (1,198 ft)

Population (2025-12-31)
  - Total: 145
  - Density: 55.3/km^{2} (143/sq mi)
- Time zone: UTC+01:00 (CET)
  - Summer (DST): UTC+02:00 (CEST)
- Postal codes: 55566
- Dialling codes: 06756
- Vehicle registration: KH
- Website: www.ippenschied.de

Ippenschied is an Ortsgemeinde – a municipality belonging to a Verbandsgemeinde, a kind of collective municipality – in the Bad Kreuznach district in Rhineland-Palatinate, Germany. It belongs to the Verbandsgemeinde Nahe-Glan.

== Geography ==
=== Location ===
Ippenschied lies in the southern Hunsrück between the Soonwald and the former NATO airfield at Pferdsfeld, in what is now Bad Sobernheim’s northern municipal exclave.

=== Neighbouring municipalities ===
Clockwise from the north, Ippenschied’s neighbours are the municipalities of Winterbach, Winterburg and Rehbach and the town of Bad Sobernheim (exclave, not main townsite), all of which likewise lie within the Bad Kreuznach district.

== History ==
Archaeological finds made within municipal limits bear witness to people living and settling in the Ippenschied area as far back as Roman times. Like all places at the forest’s outskirts (“vor dem Walde” in German), it seems likely that Ippenschied, too, arose only in the Middle Ages. In 1348, Ippenschied had its first documentary mention. Ippenschied belonged to the “Hinder” County of Sponheim, and by the partition of the Sponheim holdings in 1776, it was assigned to the Margraviate of Baden. After French Revolutionary troops had overrun and occupied the German lands on the Rhine’s left bank in 1794, the village belonged to the Canton of Sobernheim in the Department of Rhin-et-Moselle from 1798 to 1814. Under the terms of the Congress of Vienna, the region, and Ippenschied along with it, passed in 1815 to the Kingdom of Prussia, within which it was grouped into the Kreuznach district in the Regierungsbezirk of Koblenz. This was part of Prussia’s Rhine Province until 1822. Until the early 19th century, Ippenschied belonged scholastically – as it still does ecclesiastically – to Winterburg. About 1800, the village established its own school. Even before the Second World War, Ippenschied had earned distinction as a model farming village with its many agricultural operations, and indeed even today it is one of those villages in which working the land is still deeply rooted. Ippenschied, which had always been bound to the Amt of Winterburg, was assigned in 1970 to the Verbandsgemeinde of Bad Sobernheim when the Ämter were then dissolved.

=== Population development ===
Ippenschied’s population development since Napoleonic times is shown in the table below. The figures for the years from 1871 to 1987 are drawn from census data:

Year	Inhabitants
1815	165
1835	190
1871	224
1905	169
1939	174

Year	Inhabitants
1950	214
1961	153
1970	158
1987	159
2005	151

== Religion ==
As at 30 September 2013, there are 146 full-time residents in Ippenschied, and of those, 93 are Evangelical (63.699%), 15 are Catholic (10.274%), 1 (0.685%) belongs to another religious group and 37 (25.342%) either have no religion or will not reveal their religious affiliation.

== Politics ==
=== Municipal council ===
The council is made up of 6 council members, who were elected by majority vote at the municipal election held on 7 June 2009, and the honorary mayor as chairman.

=== Mayor ===
Ippenschied's mayor is Reinhard Koch.

=== Coat of arms ===
The German blazon reads: In Schwarz über doppelgeschachtem, rotsilbernem Balken ein goldener Pflug, unten ein goldenes hippenartiges Rodemesser.

The municipality's arms might in English heraldic language be described thus: Sable a fess countercompony gules and argent between a plough and a billhooklike clearing knife, both Or.

The fess with two chequered rows (“countercompony”) is a reference to the village's former allegiance to the County of Sponheim, while the charge above this, the plough, symbolizes Ippenschied's status as a farming village. The other charge, the billhook (actually, the German blazon specifies a “clearing knife” that looks like a billhook), is a canting element, for one word used in German for a billhook is Hippe, suggesting the first part of the name “Ippenschied” (although in German, as in English, the letter H is pronounced).

== Economy and infrastructure ==
=== Transport ===
Both Bundesstraße 41 (Saarbrücken–Ingelheim am Rhein) and the Nahe Valley Railway (Bingen–Saarbrücken) run by some 13 km south of Ippenschied. The nearest railway station is in Monzingen.
