= Rehbach =

- Municipality
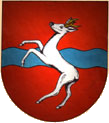
- Coat of arms

- Location of Rehbach within Bad Kreuznach district
- Interactive map of Rehbach
- Location within Germany Location within Rhineland-Palatinate
- Coordinates: 49°50′57″N 07°38′20″E
- Country: Germany
- State: Rhineland-Palatinate
- District: Bad Kreuznach
- Municipal assoc.: Nahe-Glan

Government
  - Mayor (2019–24): Reinhold Kessel

Area
  - Total: 2.21 km^{2} (0.85 sq mi)
- Elevation: 336 m (1,102 ft)

Population (2025-12-31)
  - Total: 41
  - Density: 19/km^{2} (48/sq mi)
- Time zone: UTC+01:00 (CET)
  - Summer (DST): UTC+02:00 (CEST)
- Postal codes: 55566
- Dialling codes: 06756
- Vehicle registration: KH
- Website: Rehbach

Rehbach is an Ortsgemeinde – a municipality belonging to a Verbandsgemeinde, a kind of collective municipality – in the Bad Kreuznach district in Rhineland-Palatinate, Germany. It belongs to the Verbandsgemeinde Nahe-Glan.

== Geography ==
=== Location ===
Rehbach lies on the south slope of a 400 m-high hill of the Soonwald. The village is surrounded by fields, meadows and cropfields. The nearest big towns are Bad Kreuznach to the east, Simmern to the northwest and Bad Sobernheim to the south. Until 1972, however, the village of Rehbach lay in a different place, several hundred metres to the north. It was moved to escape the noise and danger from the nearby Pferdsfeld airbase.

=== Neighbouring municipalities ===
Clockwise from the north, Rehbach's neighbours are the municipalities of Winterburg, Bockenau and Daubach, the town of Bad Sobernheim and the municipality of Ippenschied, all of which likewise lie within the Bad Kreuznach district. Although Rehbach borders on “Bad Sobernheim”, this is actually an outlying section of the town's municipal area, geographically separate from the part where the actual townsite is found. The town of Bad Sobernheim annexed the area after the residents moved to the town and asked for their former municipalities to be amalgamated after noise, and potential physical danger, from the Pferdsfeld airbase made their villages uninhabitable. The municipality on which Rehbach formerly bordered just here was called Eckweiler.

== History ==
Eckweiler was not the only village whose existence was affected by noise and the ever-present threat of military aircraft crashes from the Pferdsfeld airbase, which until about 1960 was a NATO facility used by the United States Air Force, and thereafter until 1997 a Bundeswehr base known as Fliegerhorst Pferdsfeld. Rehbach, too, forsook its original site and the whole village moved to a new one by 1972, although Rehbach retained its municipal autonomy, and even moved some of its old buildings to the new site, still within its traditional municipal area. The new village was dedicated on 25 June 1971 and the old one was subsequently levelled. All that was left standing was the graveyard (a photograph of which can be seen here) and the limetree at the old village fountain. A memorial stone at the old village site, a boulder from the Soonwald, unveiled on 1 June 1980, commemorates Rehbach's 500 years of history there. The inscription reads “500 Jahre Rehbach – Einebnung 1972 – Verweile – Gedenke” (“500 years Rehbach – Levelling 1972 – Linger – Remember”; a photograph of the memorial stone can be seen here). Both the belltower from the old village hall and the village fountain, being considered the village's foremost landmarks, were moved to the new site in November 1972 and festively rededicated. After the airfield at nearby Pferdsfeld was given up by the military in 1998, the municipality of Rehbach, together with the town of Bad Sobernheim (within whose limits the airbase lay after the acquisition of the outlying villages) and the municipality of Ippenschied founded the Planungsverband Konversionsmaßnahmen Pferdsfeld, a group whose goal was to convert the facility to civilian use. A community centre with a youth room, a slaughterhouse and firefighting facilities arose, new houses were built and in 1970 the first villagers moved in.

== Religion ==
As at 2 January 2014, there are 48 full-time residents in Rehbach, and of those, 36 are Evangelical (75%), 2 are Catholic (4.167%), and 10 (20.883%) either have no religion or will not reveal their religious affiliation.

== Politics ==
=== Municipal council ===
The council is made up of 6 council members, who were elected by majority vote at the municipal election held on 7 June 2009, and the honorary mayor as chairman.

=== Mayor ===
Rehbach's mayor is Reinhold Kessel.

=== Coat of arms ===
The German blazon reads: In Rot ein blauer Wellenbalken, belegt mit einem silbernen, goldgehörnten Rehbock.

The municipality's arms might in English heraldic language be described thus: Gules a fess wavy azure surmounted by a roebuck springing argent attired Or.

Rehbach bears canting arms, meaning that the charges in the arms suggest the village's name. The animal charge is a roebuck, or Rehbock in German, while Reh is the word for “roe deer”, and the wavy blue fess (horizontal stripe) symbolizes a brook, or Bach in German. Thus Reh + Bach makes the arms a rebus for the name “Rehbach”.

== Culture and sightseeing ==
=== Clubs ===
Relative to its small population, Rehbach is home to a large riding club of roughly 250 members. The location consists of two outdoor pens and a riding hall, with the riding complex being one of the region's largest. The club includes training in dressage and show jumping.

== Economy and infrastructure ==
=== Transport ===
Rehbach lies on Kreisstraße 23. This leads southwards to neighbouring Daubach (several hundred metres), linking with Kreisstraße 22, which itself links with Kreisstraße 20, which runs southwards to Bundesstraße 41 at Bad Sobernheim, serving which is a railway station on the Nahe Valley Railway (Bingen–Saarbrücken). Bundesstraße 50 can also be reached over Landesstraße 108, which is linked to the municipality by Kreisstraße 24.

=== Public institutions ===
Rehbach shares a volunteer fire brigade with neighbouring Daubach.
