= Auen =

Auen may refer to:

- Auen, Germany, Bad Kreuznach district, Rhineland-Palatinate
- a community in Wolfsberg, Carinthia, Austria
- ǂKxʼaoǁʼae or Auen, a southern African Khoisan language
