= Nußbaum =

- Municipality
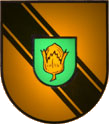
- Coat of arms

- Location of Nußbaum within Bad Kreuznach district
- Interactive map of Nußbaum
- Location within Germany Location within Rhineland-Palatinate
- Coordinates: 49°48′1″N 7°36′54″E
- Country: Germany
- State: Rhineland-Palatinate
- District: Bad Kreuznach
- Municipal assoc.: Nahe-Glan

Government
  - Mayor (2019–24): Kai Wiechert

Area
  - Total: 5.92 km^{2} (2.29 sq mi)
- Elevation: 260 m (850 ft)

Population (2025-12-31)
  - Total: 459
  - Density: 77.5/km^{2} (201/sq mi)
- Time zone: UTC+01:00 (CET)
  - Summer (DST): UTC+02:00 (CEST)
- Postal codes: 55569
- Dialling codes: 06751
- Vehicle registration: KH

Nußbaum (or Nussbaum) is an Ortsgemeinde – a municipality belonging to a Verbandsgemeinde, a kind of collective municipality – in the Bad Kreuznach district in Rhineland-Palatinate, Germany. It belongs to the Verbandsgemeinde Nahe-Glan. Nußbaum is a winegrowing village.

== Geography ==
=== Location ===
Nußbaum lies in the valley of the River Nahe. The municipal area measures 591 ha.

=== Neighbouring municipalities ===
Clockwise from the north, Nußbaum's neighbours are the municipalities of Daubach, Bockenau (although this boundary is only several metres long) and Waldböckelheim, the town of Bad Sobernheim, the municipalities of Meddersheim and Monzingen and the town of Bad Sobernheim again, all of which likewise lie within the Bad Kreuznach district. Nußbaum borders on Bad Sobernheim twice because that town's municipal area is in two geographically separate pieces with Nußbaum lying right between them. The actual townsite lies to the southeast while the part to the northwest is mainly rural.

=== Constituent communities ===
Also belonging to Nußbaum is the outlying homestead of “In der Bein”.

== History ==
The earliest traces of human habitation in what is now Nußbaum come from an ice-age supply camp from the Late Stone Age. In a building excavation in 1996, local historians discovered remnants of a fireplace in which there were reindeer antler fragments and bones, believed to have been from horses. Stone tools were also found, blade fragments among other things, at the site of this archaeological find, which lies about one kilometre south of the village. In 1295, Nußbaum had its first documentary mention and was until 1400 the knightly seat of the Knights of Nußbaum, who were vassals to the Counts of Sponheim. In the War of the Succession of Landshut (1504-1505), Nußbaum was all but utterly burnt down in 1504, as were many other places, and was only built anew from the few remnants of the old village one hundred years later. The church with its massive 13th-century steeple is used by both Catholics and Evangelicals, while the “tower with bells and rope” is the secular municipality's property. In the 18th century, the emperor granted one of Count Palatine Carl-Theodor's sons the title Count of Bretzenheim. Carl-Theodor had the Nußbaumer Schloß newly built for him, which still stands today and is under private ownership.

=== Population development ===
Nußbaum's population development since Napoleonic times is shown in the table below. The figures for the years from 1871 to 1987 are drawn from census data:

Year	Inhabitants
1815	274
1835	394
1871	409
1905	394
1939	371

Year	Inhabitants
1950	381
1961	366
1970	346
1987	335
2005	466

== Religion ==
As at 30 November 2013, there are 458 full-time residents in Nußbaum, and of those, 280 are Evangelical (61.135%), 103 are Catholic (22.489%), 3 (0.655%) belong to other religious groups and 72 (15.721%) either have no religion or will not reveal their religious affiliation.

== Politics ==
=== Municipal council ===
The council is made up of 8 council members, who were elected by majority vote at the municipal election held on 7 June 2009, and the honorary mayor as chairman.

=== Mayor ===
Nußbaum's mayor is Kai Wiechert.

=== Coat of arms ===
The German blazon reads: In Gold ein schwarzer Schrägbalken, beseitet von je einer schwarzen Leiste, belegt mit einem grünen Schildchen, darin eine goldene Haselnuss.

The municipality's arms might in English heraldic language be described thus: Or a bend cotticed sable surmounted by an inescutcheon vert charged with a hazelnut slipped palewise of the first.

The underlying composition of the shield with the bend cotticed (slanted stripe flanked by two narrower stripes) was drawn from a seal used by the knight Sir Emmerich von Nußbaum (1385). The inescutcheon with the hazelnut is a canting element for the village's name (“Nußbaum” means “nut tree” in German).

== Culture and sightseeing ==
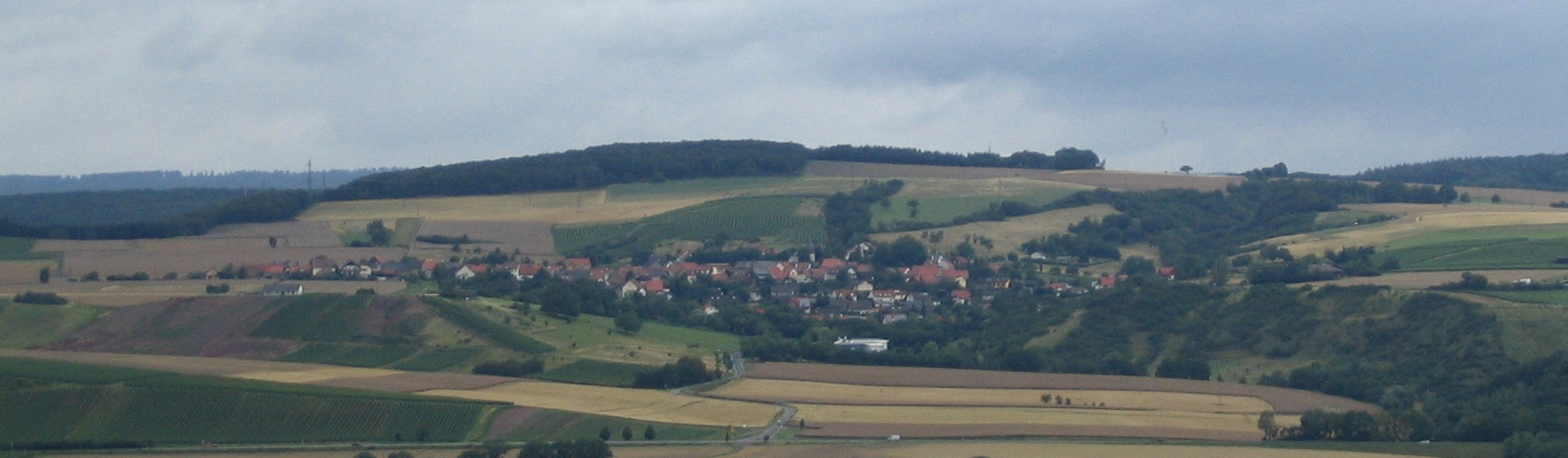
Panorama of Nußbaum, as seen from Meddersheim

=== Buildings ===
The following are listed buildings or sites in Rhineland-Palatinate’s Directory of Cultural Monuments:

- Shared church, Am Kuhberg 1 – former quire tower, essentially possibly Late Romanesque; Late Baroque aisleless church, marked 1753 and 1753/1931; in the graveyard Baroque grave cross
- Enggasse 1 – estate complex, Late Baroque homestead, 18th century; building with half-hip roof, timber framing plastered, marked 1766
- Im Winkel 12 – so-called Schloss; Late Baroque estate complex, marked 1792; one-floor building with mansard roof (marked 1791), commercial buildings with hip and half-hip roofs

=== More about buildings ===
Nußbaum's Schloss is still under private ownership today, and may not be visited by the public. An interesting curiosity, however, is offered by the local shared church. Built in the 13th century and renovated in the 17th, it was divided as a result of religious disagreements into three in 1880. A wall was then built down the middle and a second doorway was knocked through, and ever since, when arriving for services, Protestants have entered the church through the lefthand door while Catholics have entered through the righthand one. The third division came about over a further disagreement as to who should own the upper floor, the steeple and the bells. This was settled by turning them over to the municipality's ownership.

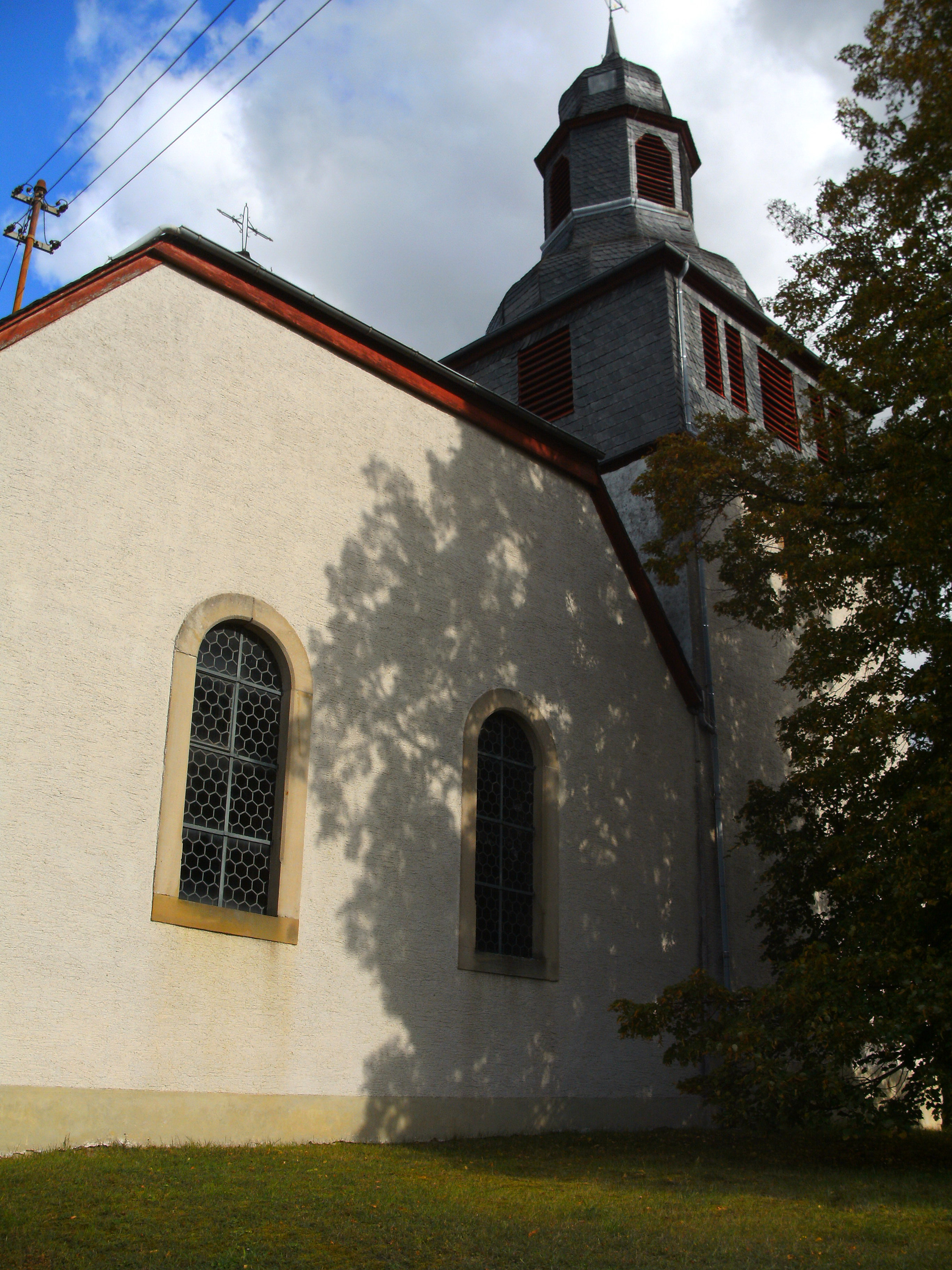
Am Kuhberg 1 – Shared church

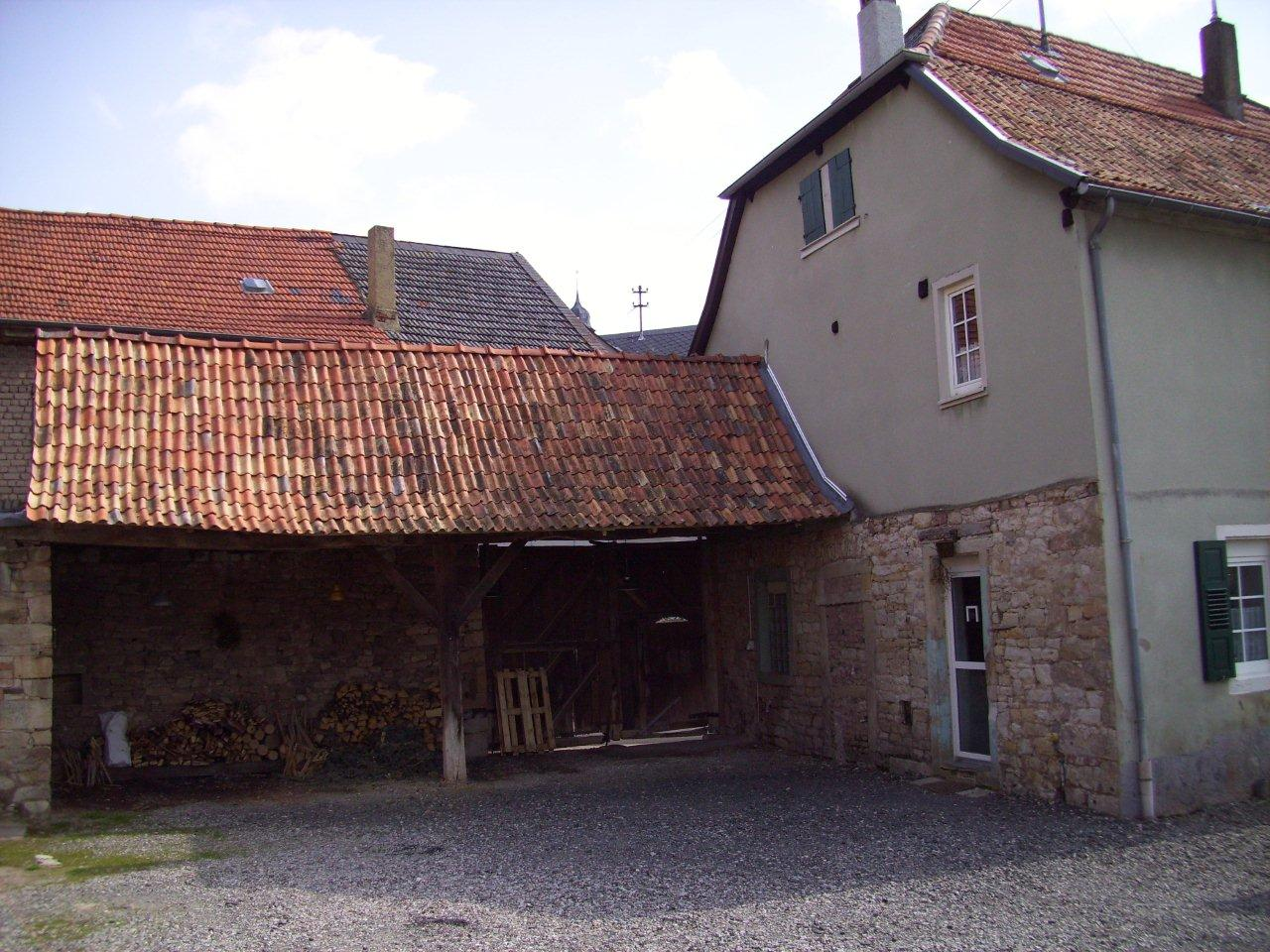
Enggasse 1 – Late Baroque homestead

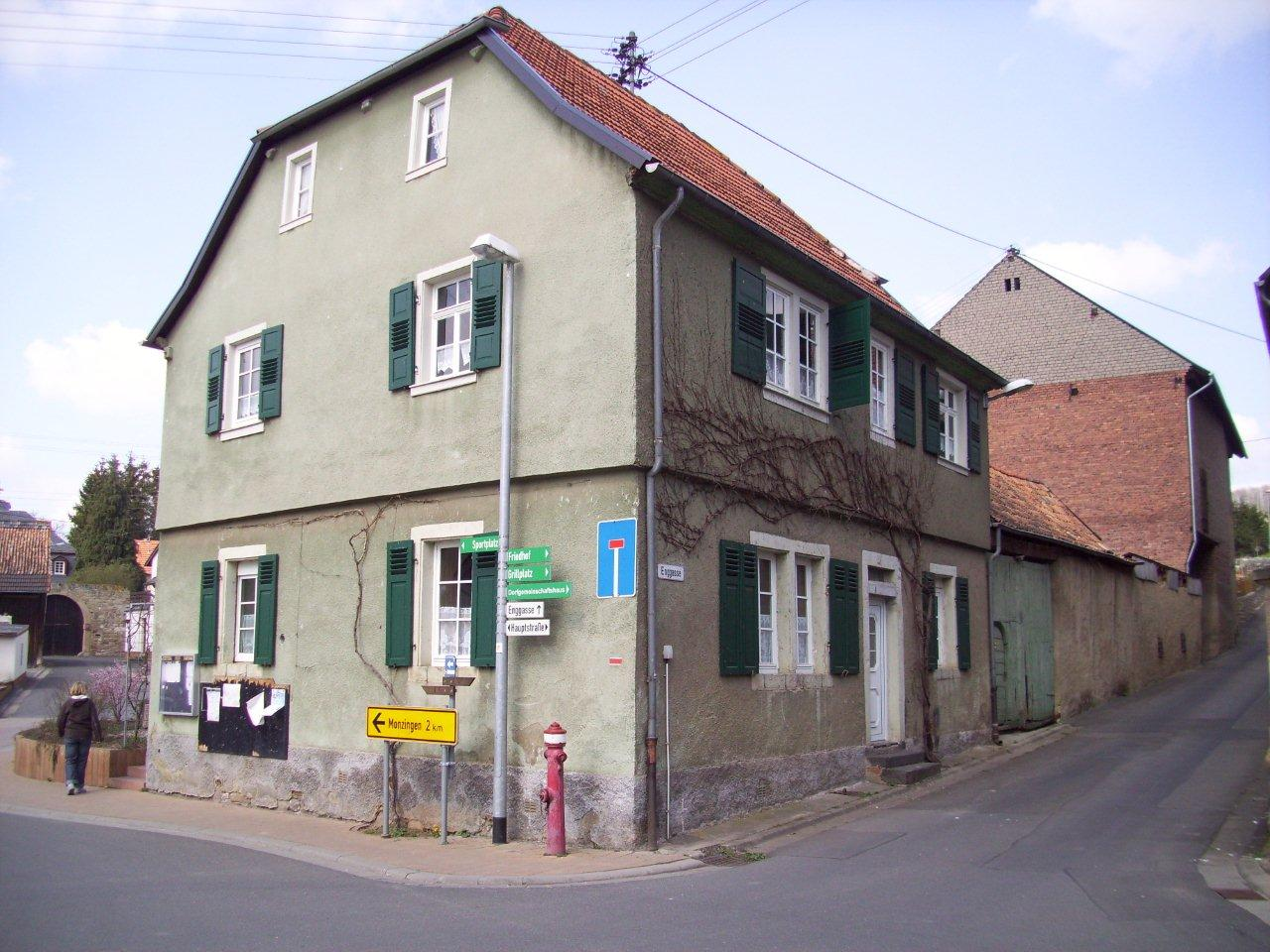
Enggasse 1 – Late Baroque homestead (other side)

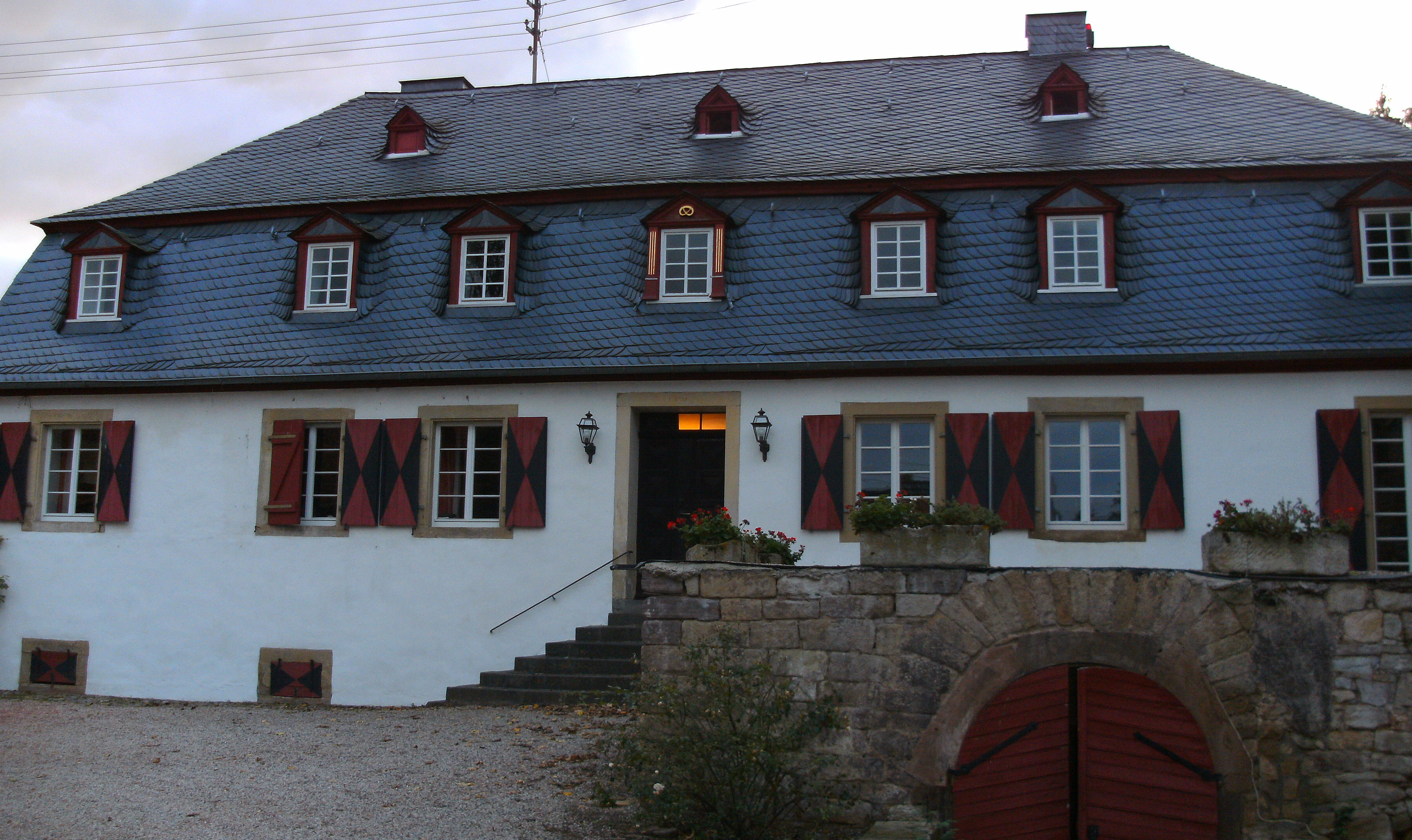
Im Winkel 12 – So-called Schloss

== Economy and infrastructure ==
=== Transport ===
Bending at a sharp angle through Nußbaum is Kreisstraße 19, which within the village forms Mühlenstraße and part of Hauptstraße. To the south, this leads to Bundesstraße 41 on the municipality's outskirts. Going eastwards, that leads to neighbouring Bad Sobernheim, and farther on to Rüdesheim an der Nahe and the district seat, Bad Kreuznach. Going westwards, the highway leads to Simmertal and eventually Idar-Oberstein. Also going westwards, Kreisstraße 19 leads to neighbouring Monzingen, serving which is a railway station on the Nahe Valley Railway (Bingen–Saarbrücken).

=== Established businesses ===
Since 1996, the homoeopathic pharmaceutical company Hevert-Arzneimittel has had its head office in Nußbaum, employing almost 40 workers. Since the company was founded in 1956 by Dorothea and Emil Hevert, it has been an independent family business. After having been headed by Dr. Wolfgang Hevert, the company is now headed by the third generation in the person of Mathias Hevert.

=== Winegrowing ===
Nußbaum wine ripens on a vineyard area of 20 ha in the individual winegrowing locations – Einzellagen – of “Rotfeld”, “Höllenberg” and “Sonnenberg”. One winegrowing family, the Family Müller, have been plying their craft since 1588. Manfred Müller now also makes Sekt, which was formerly shaken by hand, although machines now do this job.
