= Emanuel Felke =

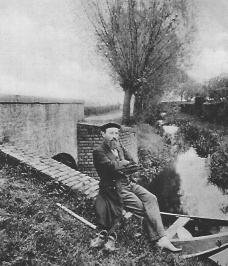
Clay Pastor Felke circa 1900

The Protestant pastor Leopold Erdmann Emanuel Felke (7 February 1856 in Kläden, Province of Saxony, Prussia – 16 August 1926 in Munich, buried in Bad Sobernheim) was a naturopath who developed the eponymous Felke cure, and who was active in Repelen near Moers from 1896 to 1914 and in Bad Sobernheim from 1915 to 1925. He also practiced iris diagnosis (iridology) and is considered the co-father of combination homeopathic remedies.

== Biography ==
Because his treatments included applications of clay and clay baths, Felke was often referred to as the clay pastor. Felke's regimen included a healthy diet and outdoor exercise. His patients were given meals that contained little meat, healing earth applications and cold baths in outdoor zinc bathtubs, and they had to sleep on clay floors or straw sacks in cabins open to the light and air.

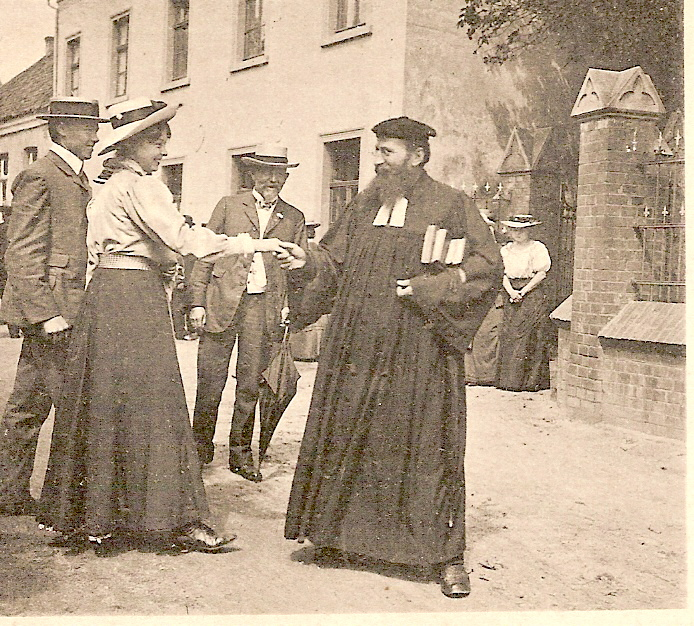
Pastor Felke in Repelen in front of the Linden Hotel

Felke, the son of a teacher and a minister's daughter, became interested in medical issues while he was studying theology and he attended medical lectures for several semesters. He had always been interested in medicinal plants, as well as in the well-known natural healers Hahnemann (the originator of homeopathy), and Priessnitz (hydrotherapy). At his first rectorate in Cronenberg he treated patients with homeopathic remedies during a diphtheria epidemic and was regarded by his patients. In 1894, he began his ministration as pastor at the Protestant village church in Repelen. In 1896, several residents established a homeopathic society in Repelen to support Felke's work because in most cases he dispensed the homeopathic remedies free of charge.

Felke is considered the co-father of combination homeopathic remedies because he, deviating from Hahnemann's teachings, began to combine different active substances to treat chronic diseases. In 1897, Felke and several town representatives traveled to the Harz Mountains where Adolf Just, another well-known natural medicine practitioner of the time, had recently founded a "Jungborn", or health resort, in Eckertal, to see this resort. The visit no doubt left such a strong impression that it was decided to create a similar spa in Repelen.

A large tract of grassland and farmland on Repelen Lake, not far from the village church, was purchased for 50,000 gold marks (today just under EUR 250,000) and the spa grounds were laid out with considerable personal effort. Fifty open-air cabins were added as accommodations for 100 to 120 people, and pavilions were set up as relaxing and lounging spaces. The Jungborn grounds, still one of the most popular parks in Moers, were dedicated in 1898. Because both the bath applications and the sports and calisthenics were performed unclothed, there were two bathing parks surrounded by stockade fences, one for men and one for women.

Felke built up a flourishing spa business, first in Repelen and then in Bad Sobernheim. Although initially it was assumed that the original size of the resort was more than generous, in the season from May to October there up to 400 spa guests in Repelen, so many of them had to be lodged at private boarding houses. Many of the spa guests came from far away, including from the United States, England and Russia. This provided an enormous economic boost for the town and in particular for the hotel industry. In 1914, the Jungborn hotel was built. However, this new movement, unusual as it was for the rural population, was also highly criticized. Because the spa guests were naked during treatments, Felke was accused of endangering morals, a charge which he vehemently defended himself against. When a requirement to increase the height of the surrounding fences to three meters was not met quickly enough, the park was closed for a short time in 1899. Church authorities also viewed Felke's activities as suspect. When inquiries were made, though, the congregation never failed to confirm that Felke always also fulfilled his pastoral duties.

These criticisms did not prevent a full-fledged Felke movement from forming. By 1914, Felke spas had been established in Berlin, Aachen, Krefeld, Kettwig, Dortmund, and Stettin. These institutions were not allowed to use the name Repelen method or Felke method unless they received confirmation from Felke that they had been trained and authorized by him. During this time a number of Felke societies were formed in Germany, totaling more than 2,500 members. A Felke journal was also published at this time.

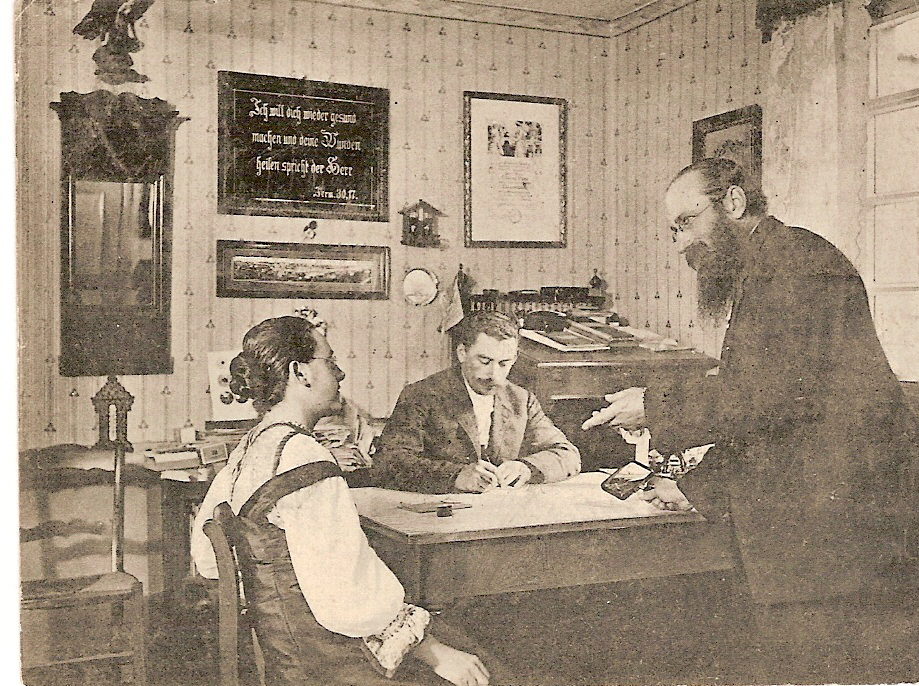
Pastor Felke in his medical office in Repelen

When World War I broke out, development was abruptly stopped. The spa facilities were used as a military hospital. Added to this was that in 1912 Felke had to give up his rectory because of infidelity and now had no income at all because even after doing this he continued to provide his homeopathic treatments free of charge. So Felke moved to Sobernheim in 1915 to stay with one of his students and there he built up a thriving spa once again.

After the war, even though Felke went to Repelen every 14 days, business at the spa there never returned to the original levels it had once had. As a result, the spa closed; the Jungborn Society ended up selling the hotel to an innkeeper, and in 1934 it ceased all activities.

Felke was active in Sobernheim until his death and he was a big part of the reason why this town on the Nahe River became a successful spa destination. This is why a monument was erected in his honor there, he was made an honorary resident, and there is a Felke museum.

== Work ==
=== Iridology ===
Felke was known for his practice of iridology. While the technique was a readily accepted method of diagnosis by many physicians, many others shunned it. Felke was accused of causing bodily harm in a total of 16 lawsuits and in the last case he was even accused of manslaughter, but he was always acquitted. In the last trial, which took place in 1909, Felke had to, in front of number of doctors—including some very prominent ones, such as the surgeon and privy councilor Garre—diagnose 20 patients only by looking at their irises. Felke protested because talking to the patients, which he usually did to take their medical histories, was not permitted. The normal process of interrogation by the therapist of the patient as a human being who able to relate his feelings and physical ailments was shunned by doctors. How many diagnoses were correct is not known, but he was able to convince the judges.

=== The Felke cure ===
The Felke cure has the following basic elements:

1. Felke sitz-bath
2. Light-and-air bath
3. Clay bath
4. Ground sleeping (lying down on and sleeping on the ground at night)

The applications were supplemented by a nearly meat-free diet with a plenty of vegetables, unripe spelt, potatoes and fruit, with which Felke hoped to detoxify the body through undernourishment. For some patients Felke prescribed different diets, depending on their diagnoses.

In 1992, a barefoot walk that was inspired by Felke's ideas was created in Bad Sobernheim. This 3.5 km loop has different stations, such as natural stones, gravel, wood, mud pools, water, balancing stations and grassy areas, to activate the senses, the foot's reflex zones, and the musculoskeletal system.

There are still a number of Felke societies today. Bad Sobernheim continues to be a center of Felke cures with three health resorts, with another one in Diez on the Lahn and one in Meddersheim (close to Bad Sobernheim). Both clay cures and iridology have become an established part of the practice of naturopathy in the early 21st century. The Felke Institute for Iridology was established in 1984. There is also a Medical Working Group for Felke Therapy with offices in Bad Sobernheim and a manufacturer of combination homeopathic remedies, Hevert-Arzneimittel GmbH & Co. KG.

Like Kneipp, Preissnitz, Rikli, Kuhne and Just, Felke is one of a number of influential lay practitioners who played major roles in developing naturopathy in the early 20th century. Even so, Felke never made a secret of the fact that he did not consider himself the inventor of a new treatment. "Homeopathy is what won me over with its simplicity and uniformity. It is the backbone of my entire method…"

While Pastor Felke initially prescribed mostly single homeopathic remedies, later on he created his combination homeopathic remedies based on his practical experiences. He used these remedies almost exclusively in the last 10 years, acting on the principle that a treatment would work the fastest if the "complex diseases" present in most patients were countered with a "complex remedy."
