= Daubach, Hunsrück =

Daubach
- Municipality
- Coat of arms

- Location of Daubach within Bad Kreuznach district
- Interactive map of Daubach
- Location within Germany Location within Rhineland-Palatinate
- Coordinates: 49°50′46″N 7°38′3″E
- Country: Germany
- State: Rhineland-Palatinate
- District: Bad Kreuznach
- Municipal assoc.: Nahe-Glan

Government
  - Mayor (2019–24): Harald Klotz

Area
  - Total: 2.91 km^{2} (1.12 sq mi)
- Elevation: 320 m (1,050 ft)

Population (2025-12-31)
  - Total: 219
  - Density: 75.3/km^{2} (195/sq mi)
- Time zone: UTC+01:00 (CET)
  - Summer (DST): UTC+02:00 (CEST)
- Postal codes: 55566
- Dialling codes: 06756
- Vehicle registration: KH

Daubach (German pronunciation: [ˈdaʊbax]) is an Ortsgemeinde – a municipality belonging to a Verbandsgemeinde, a kind of collective municipality – in the Bad Kreuznach district in Rhineland-Palatinate, Germany. It belongs to the Verbandsgemeinde Nahe-Glan.

== Geography ==
=== Location ===
Daubach lies in the southern Hunsrück north of Bad Sobernheim. It is a residential community that is nonetheless characterized by agriculture. The municipal area measures 292 ha.

=== Neighbouring municipalities ===
Clockwise from the north, Daubach's neighbours are the municipalities of Rehbach, Bockenau, Nußbaum and the town of Bad Sobernheim, although this is in fact the outlying piece of that town's municipal area, a mostly rural swathe of land, not the one containing the actual town. Daubach's municipal area also comes to within a matter of metres of a salient jutting out of Waldböckelheim’s municipal area.

=== Constituent communities ===
Also belonging to Daubach are the outlying homesteads of Birkenhof and Sonnenhof.

== History ==
About how the village came to have the name Daubach nothing is known. What is known, however, is that the name was written Daupach in 1377, thus showing at least that the village has had a similar name for well over six hundred years. It lay on the road that led from Meisenheim and Sobernheim by way of Eckweiler (a now vanished village that was given up in 1979, lying in what is now Bad Sobernheim’s municipal exclave northwest of Daubach), Gemünden and Kirchberg to Trier. Daubach’s membership in the church parish called “Geh in Kirche” (“Go to Church”) was mentioned quite early on. With the partition of the County of Sponheim about 1232, Daubach passed to the “Further” County of Sponheim-Kreuznach and to the newly founded Amt of Winterburg. Between 1580 and 1600, Daubach had 12 houses and 54 inhabitants. Daubach and Eckweiler for centuries shared the same history. In 1866, the Evangelical church was built, but it remained a branch church of Eckweiler. The Catholics belonged to the parish of Rehbach.

=== Population development ===
Daubach's population development since Napoleonic times is shown in the table below. The figures for the years from 1871 to 1987 are drawn from census data:

Year	Inhabitants
1815	149
1835	177
1871	169
1905	188
1939	151

Year	Inhabitants
1950	147
1961	121
1970	127
1987	195
2005	234

== Religion ==
As at 31 August 2013, there are 228 full-time residents in Daubach, and of those, 105 are Evangelical (46.053%), 66 are Catholic (28.947%), 1 (0.439%) belongs to another religious group and 56 (24.561%) either have no religion or will not reveal their religious affiliation.

== Politics ==
=== Municipal council ===
The council is made up of 6 council members, who were elected by majority vote at the municipal election held on 7 June 2009, and the honorary mayor as chairman.

=== Mayor ===
Daubach's mayor is Harald Klotz.

=== Coat of arms ===
The German blazon reads: Ein rot-silberner geschachteter Schild, belegt mit einem grünen Wellenbalken.

The municipality's arms might in English heraldic language be described thus: Chequy of twenty gules and argent a fess wavy vert.

Since there is not much of a clue about the village's local history, the municipality adopted the arms formerly borne by the “Hinder” County of Sponheim, but with the addition of a wavy fess (horizontal stripe). The former county's “chequy” arms of course recall the village's allegiance thereto in centuries gone by, and the fess is canting for the second syllable in Daubach's name, Bach being the German word for “brook”.

== Culture and sightseeing ==
=== Buildings ===
The following are listed buildings or sites in Rhineland-Palatinate’s Directory of Cultural Monuments:

- Evangelical church, Hauptstraße 44: Late Classicist sandstone quarrystone building, latter half of the 19th century
- In Hauptstraße 43, in the Catholic church's new building: altar installation and baptismal font, both about 1750, three gravestones, late 18th century, from the demolished church at Rehbach

==== Other buildings ====
Successful transformations resulting from village renewal measures can be seen in various places in Daubach, for instance at the newly built belltower in the village centre. This was built in memory of the old town hall and a bakehouse with the original bell from 1719.

== Economy and infrastructure ==
=== Transport ===
Running by 8 km south of Daubach are Bundesstraße 41 and the Nahe Valley Railway (Bingen–Saarbrücken), on which is a station at Bad Sobernheim.
