= Bad Sobernheim =

- Town
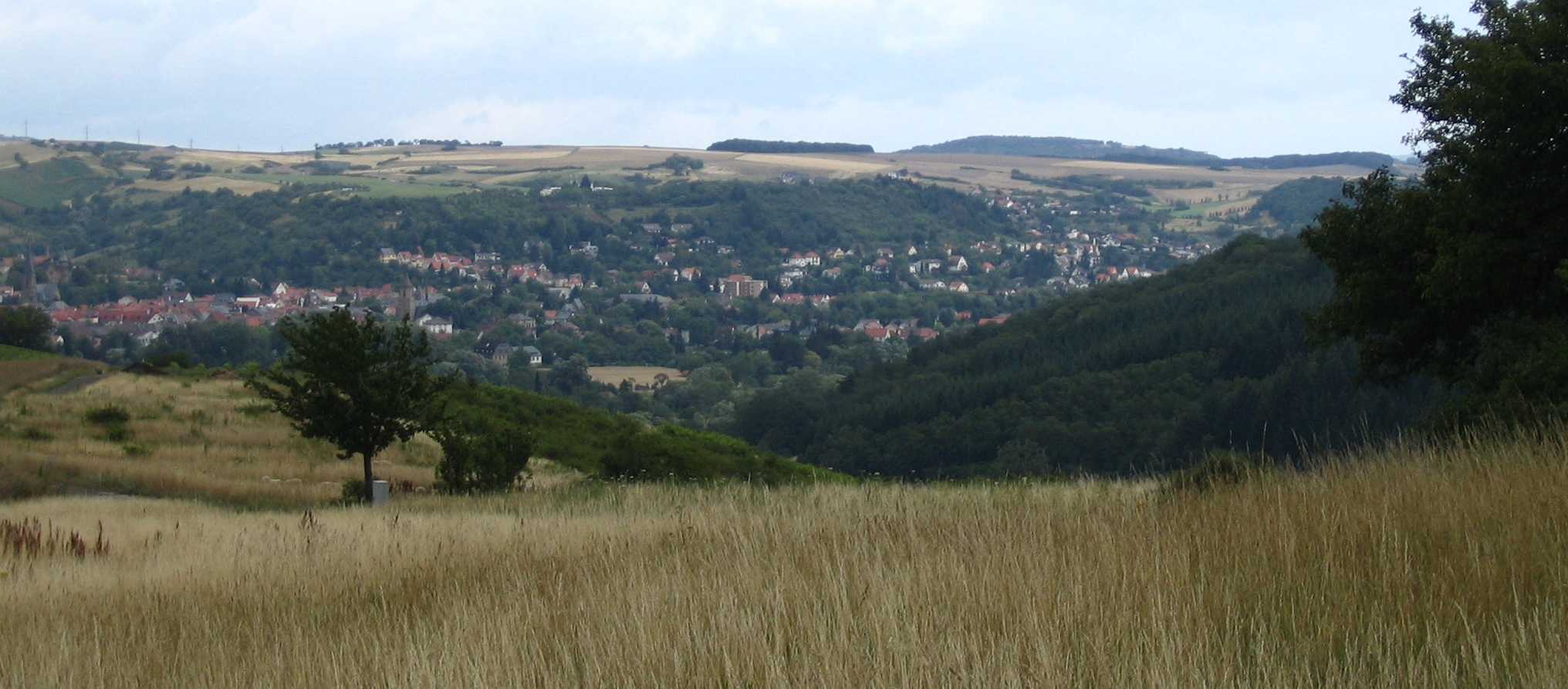

- Coat of arms

- Location of Bad Sobernheim within Bad Kreuznach district
- Interactive map of Bad Sobernheim
- Location within Germany Location within Rhineland-Palatinate
- Coordinates: 49°47′14″N 07°39′10″E
- Country: Germany
- State: Rhineland-Palatinate
- District: Bad Kreuznach
- Municipal assoc.: Nahe-Glan

Government
  - Mayor (2024–29): Roland Ruegenberg (Ind.)

Area
  - Total: 54.18 km^{2} (20.92 sq mi)
- Elevation: 141–620 m (463–2,034 ft)

Population (2025-12-31)
  - Total: 6,536
  - Density: 120.6/km^{2} (312.4/sq mi)
- Time zone: UTC+01:00 (CET)
  - Summer (DST): UTC+02:00 (CEST)
- Postal codes: 55566
- Dialling codes: 06751
- Vehicle registration: KH
- Website: www.bad-sobernheim.de

Bad Sobernheim (German pronunciation: [baːt ˈzoːbɐnˌhaɪm]) is a town in the Bad Kreuznach district in Rhineland-Palatinate, Germany. It belongs to the Verbandsgemeinde Nahe-Glan, and is also its seat. It is a state-recognized spa town, and is well known for two fossil discovery sites and for the naturopath Emanuel Felke. Bad Sobernheim is also a winegrowing town.

== History ==
In the New Stone Age (roughly 3000 to 1800 BC) and during the time of the Hunsrück-Eifel Culture (600 to 100 BC), the Bad Sobernheim area was settled, as it likewise was later in Roman times. Beginning about AD 450, the Franks set up a new settlement here. However, only in 1074 was this "villa" (that is, village) of Suberenheim first mentioned in a document, one made out to Ravengiersburg Abbey. The Sobernheim dwellers then were farmers (some of whom were townsmen) and craftsmen, and into modern times they earned their livelihoods mainly at agriculture, forestry and winegrowing. Businesses and trades existed, but they were often linked with farming. Several monastic orders held landholds in the town. Furthermore, several noble families were resident, such as the Counts of Sponheim, the Raugraves and the Knights of Steinkallenfels. Administration was led by an archiepiscopal Schultheiß, who by 1269 at the latest also had three Schöffen (roughly "lay jurists") at his side. They also formed the first town court. In 1259, Sobernheim was split away from Disibodenberg; only the pastoral duties remained in the monks' hands. Sobernheim was from the Early Middle Ages a centre among the estates held by the Archbishopric of Mainz on both the Nahe and the Glan. It was subject to the vice-lord of the Rheingau. The archbishop transferred Saint Matthew's Church (Kirche St. Matthias) to the monks at Disibodenberg. The Romanesque-Early Gothic building was newly built about 1400 and renovated in the 19th century. The town was granted town rights on the Frankfurt model in 1292 by King Adolf of Nassau and again in 1324 by Emperor Louis the Bavarian. It was, however, the town rights on the Bingen model granted by Archbishop Baldwin of Trier in 1330 that became operative and remained so until the French Revolutionary Wars. Until 1259, Sobernheim was administered by Disibodenberg, and thereafter until 1471 by the Burgraves of Böckelheim. In the Nine Years' War (known in Germany as the Pfälzischer Erbfolgekrieg, or War of the Palatine Succession), the fortifications and most of the town's buildings were destroyed by the French. Named in 1403, besides the archiepiscopal Schultheiß, were a mayor and 14 Schöffen drawn from among the townsmen. At that time, there were also Jews living here, who worked at trading. A stone bridge spanned the Nahe beginning sometime between 1423 and 1426, but after a flood shifted the riverbed towards the south in 1627, it sat high and dry in the meadows and was only replaced with the current bridge in 1867–1868. In 1471, Elector Palatine Friedrich I's conquests for Electoral Palatinate included Sobernheim, ending Burgravial rule. Two great fires laid almost the whole town waste in 1567 and 1689. The oldest part of the town hall (Rathaus) was built in 1535, with later expansions being undertaken in 1805, 1837 and 1861–1862. There was already a school sometime after 1530. Despite efforts by the Archbishopric of Mainz, Sobernheim remained with Electoral Palatinate until the French Revolution, then passing to France's Department of Rhin-et-Moselle after the French conquest in the years 1792–1797, which ended the Elector's own rule. Sobernheim became the seat of a mairie ("mayoralty") that included not only the town itself but also the outlying villages of Waldböckelheim, Thalböckelheim, Schloßböckelheim, Steinhardt, Boos, Oberstreit, Bockenau, Burgsponheim and Sponheim as well as a Friedensgericht ("Peace Court"; in 1879 this became an Amtsgericht). After the Napoleonic Wars had ended and the Congress of Vienna had been concluded, the town passed to the Kingdom of Prussia in 1815. The mairie became a Bürgermeisterei (also "mayoralty") under Prussian administration. The year 1817 saw the two Protestant denominations, Lutheran and Reformed, united. In 1857, the King of Prussia once more – for the fourth time in the town's history – granted Sobernheim town rights. In 1858, members of the town's Jewish community built a synagogue. This lasted for 80 years before it was destroyed by Brownshirt thugs on Kristallnacht (9–10 November 1938). Industrial development took a long time to make itself felt in Sobernheim, even after the town was linked to the new Rhine-Nahe-Saar Railway in 1859. A cardboard packaging printshop opened for business in 1832, a stocking factory in 1865 and a gelatine factory in 1886/1887. There was also a factory that made sheet-metal articles, and after 1900 there were two brickworks. The Kreuznach district savings bank (Kreissparkasse Kreuznach) was founded in Sobernheim in 1878 and moved to Bad Kreuznach in 1912. A Catholic hospital opened in 1886, as did a location of the Rhenish Deaconry in 1889. In 1888, the Prussian government split the outlying villages from the town, making them a Bürgermeisterei in their own right, called Waldböckelheim. A new development began after 1900 with the introduction of the Felkekur ("Felke cure"). From 1915 until his death in 1926, Pastor Emanuel Felke worked in Bad Sobernheim. He was a representative of naturopathy who developed the treatment so named, which now bears his name. This cure is to this day still applied at Bad Sobernheim's many spa houses. His student Dhonau established a Felke treatment house across the Nahe that began operations in 1907. Further such houses sprang up in 1924 (Stassen), 1926 (Neues Leben) and 1928 (Menschel). The small Amt of Meddersheim was in 1935 brought into joint administration with Sobernheim and, as of 1940, was wholly merged with the town to form the new Amt of Sobernheim. The Second World War brought not only a toll in human lives but also damage from Allied air raids. Reconstruction began with the 1948 currency reform and brought into being a town of some 7,000 inhabitants in which trade, industry, services and public institutions defined economic life. Several central schools, extensive sport facilities and the raising to a Felke spa town are more recent milestones in the town's development. In the course of administrative restructuring in Rhineland-Palatinate in 1969 and 1970, the Verbandsgemeinde of Sobernheim was formed. Belonging to this originally were 20 Ortsgemeinden and the town of Sobernheim, but the number of Ortsgemeinden dropped to 18 in 1979 with the dissolution of the Ortsgemeinden of Pferdsfeld and Eckweiler, whose municipal areas made up the swathe of non-contiguous municipal territory lying to the northwest. The German Air Force was stationed at the outlying centre of Pferdsfeld from 1960 with the Leichtes Kampfgeschwader ("Light Combat Squadron") 42 and from 1975 with the Jagdbombergeschwader 35 (Jagdgeschwader 73). On 1 January 1969, a tract of land with 121 inhabitants was transferred from the municipality of Waldböckelheim to Sobernheim. On 10 June 1979, the hitherto self-administering municipalities of Eckweiler and Pferdsfeld were amalgamated with Sobernheim. Since 11 December 1995, the town has borne the designation "Bad" (literally "bath") in recognition of its tradition as a healing centre.

== Politics ==
=== Town council ===
The council is made up of 22 council members, who were elected by proportional representation at the municipal election held on 7 June 2009, and the honorary mayor as chairman.

Year	SPD	CDU	FDP	Greens	FWG	Total
2009	8	9	1	2	2	22 seats
2004	8	7	1	2	4	22 seats

=== Mayor ===
Bad Sobernheim's mayor is Michael Greiner (SPD), and his deputies are Alois Bruckmeier (FWG) and Ulrich Schug (Greens).

=== Town partnerships ===
Bad Sobernheim fosters partnerships with the following places:

- Louvres, Val-d'Oise, France
- Edelény, Borsod-Abaúj-Zemplén County, Hungary

== Culture and sightseeing ==
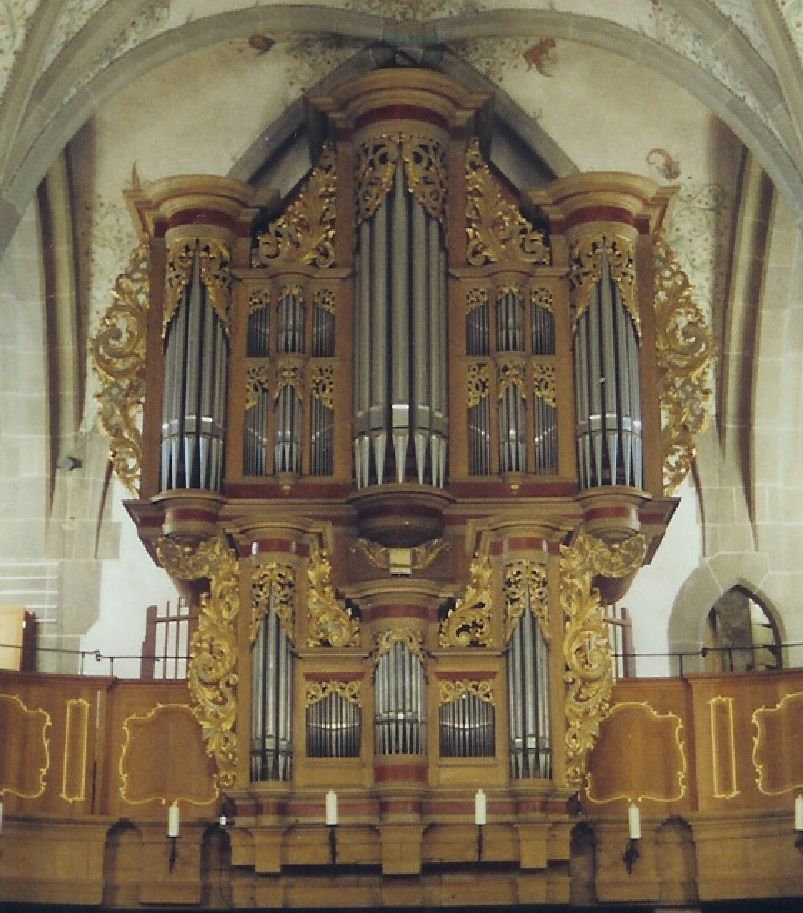
Igelsbachstraße 7 – Saint Matthew’s Evangelical Parish Church (Pfarrkirche St. Matthias), Stumm organ

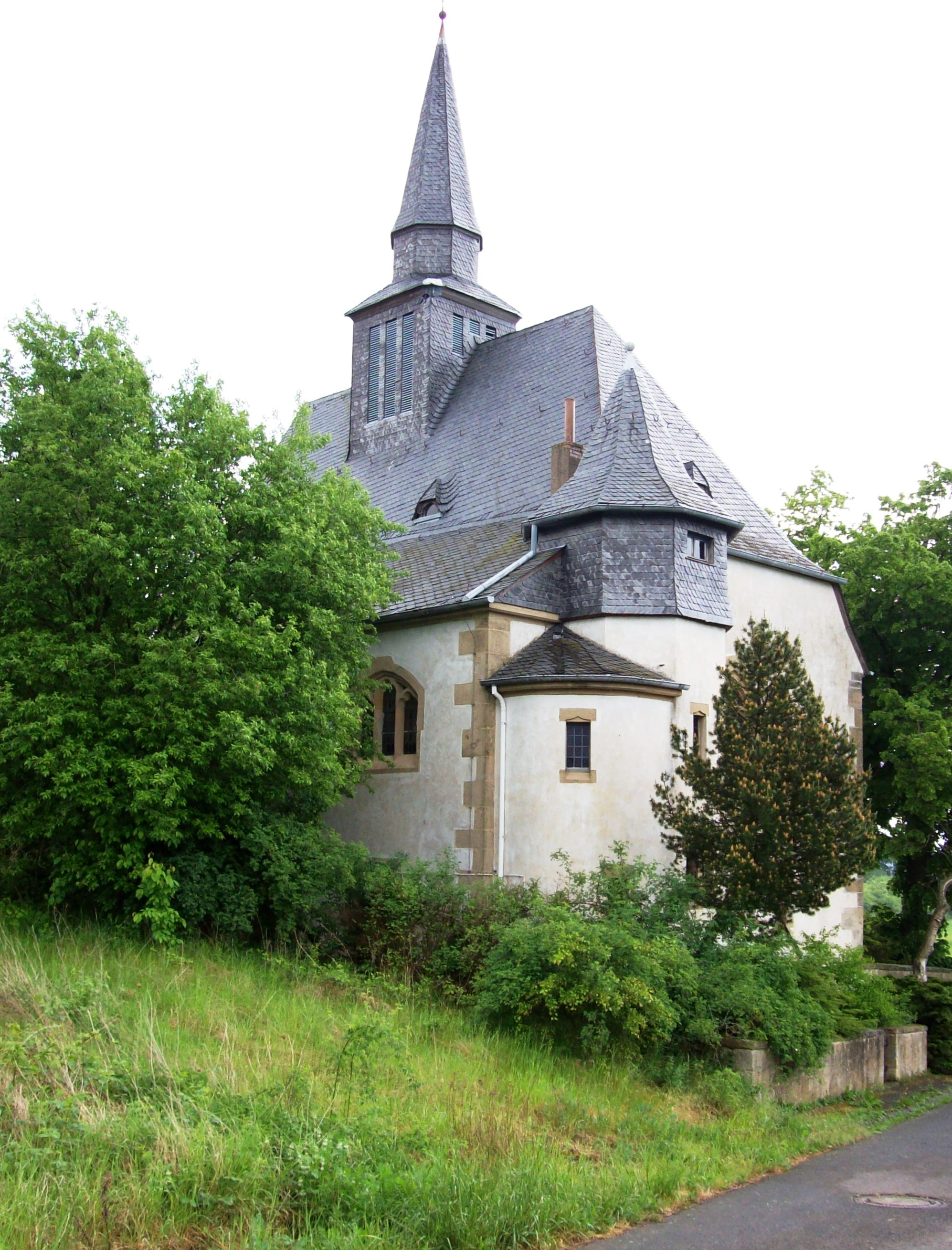
Eckweiler: Evangelical church

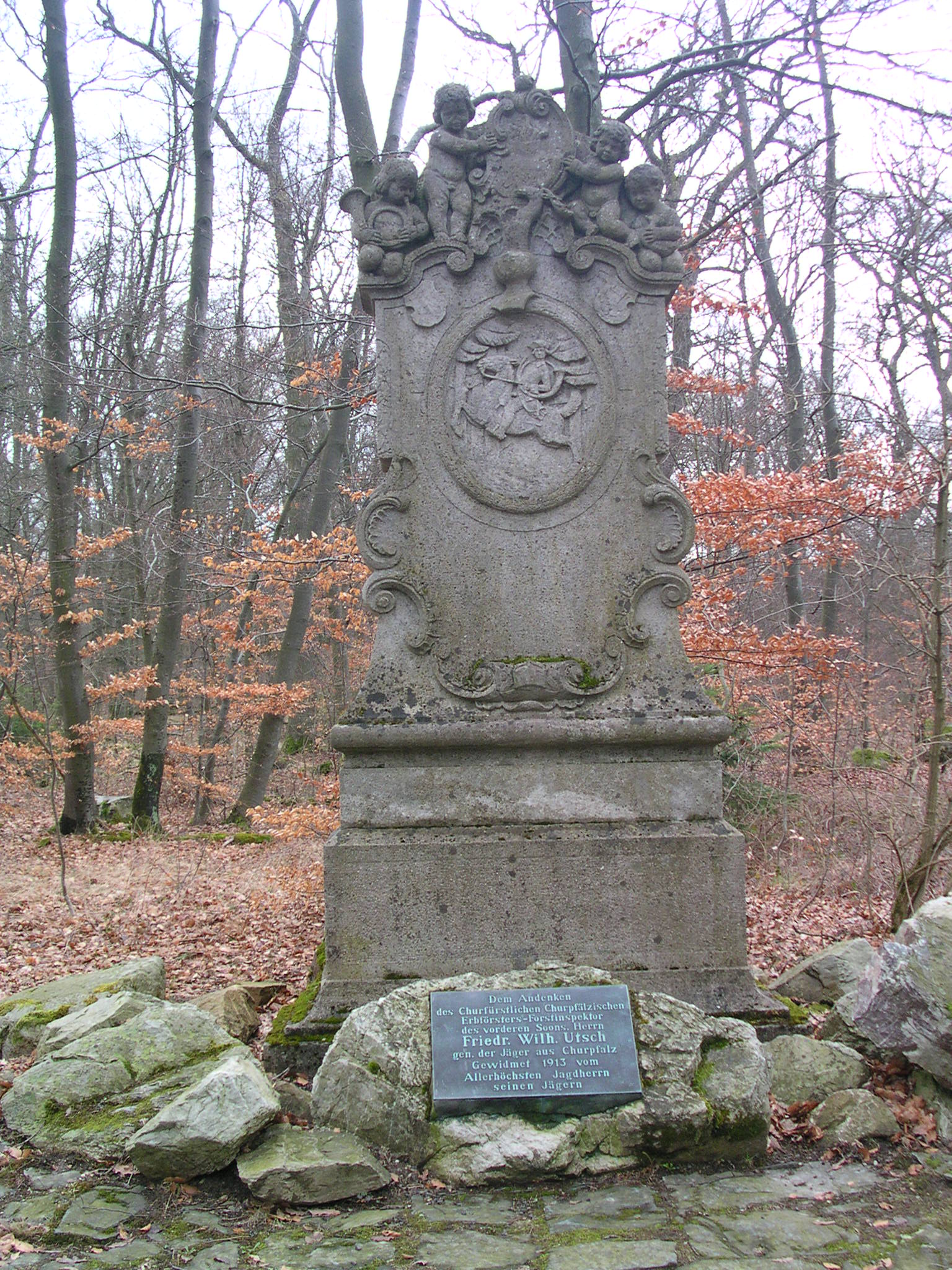
Eckweiler, Entenpfuhl: monument to the "Hunter from the Palatinate" ("Jäger aus Kurpfalz")

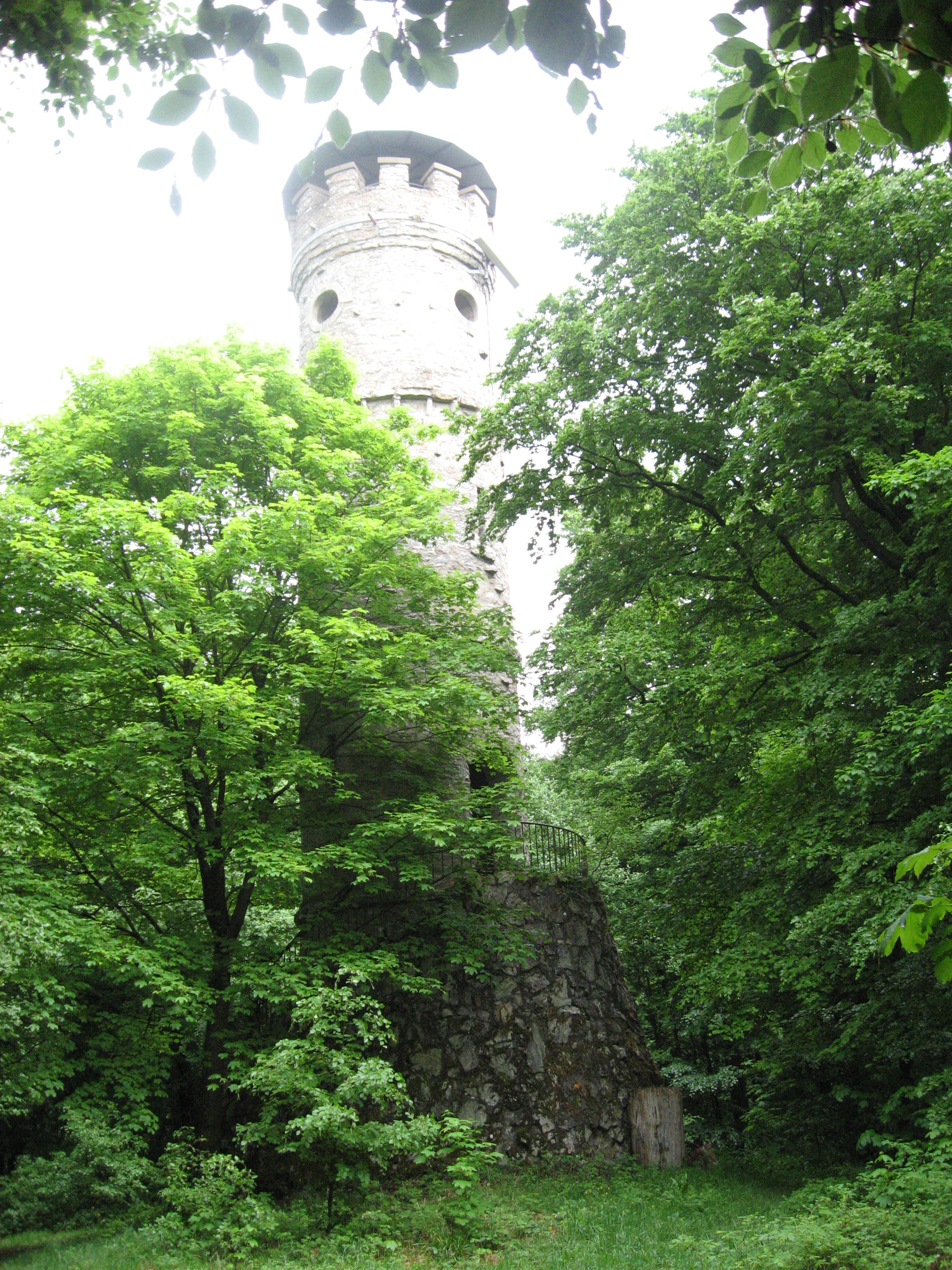
Pferdsfeld, in the Soonwald: Alteburg Tower

Bad Sobernheim is home to several former landholds once belonging to noblemen or monasteries in bygone centuries. The Steinhardter Hof temporarily served as a hideout towards the end of the 18th century for the robbers Johann Peter Petri, called "Schwarzer Peter" ("Black Peter") and Johannes Bückler, called "Schinderhannes".

== Economy and infrastructure ==
=== Winegrowing and tourism ===
Bad Sobernheim belongs to the Nahe wine region. The winemaking appellation – Großlage – is called Paradiesgarten, while individual Sobernheim wineries – Einzellagen – are Domberg and Marbach.

=== Healthcare and spa facilities ===
The therapeutic facilities founded by the Bad Sobernheim citizens Felke and Schroth are an important economic factor for the town. Listed here are some of the town's healthcare facilities:

- Asklepios Katharina-Schroth-Klinik Bad Sobernheim – orthopaedic rehabilitation centre for scoliosis and other spinal deformities and for intensive scoliosis rehabilitation using Katharina Schroth's methods
- Romantikhotel Bollant’s im Park & Felke Therme Kurhaus Dhonau
- Hotel Maasberg Therme
- Menschel Vitalresort (near Meddersheim)
- Seniors’ residences: Seniorenresidenz Felkebad
- Pharmacies: Kur-Apotheke at the marketplace and Felke-Apotheke at Saarplatz
