= Winterburg =

- Municipality
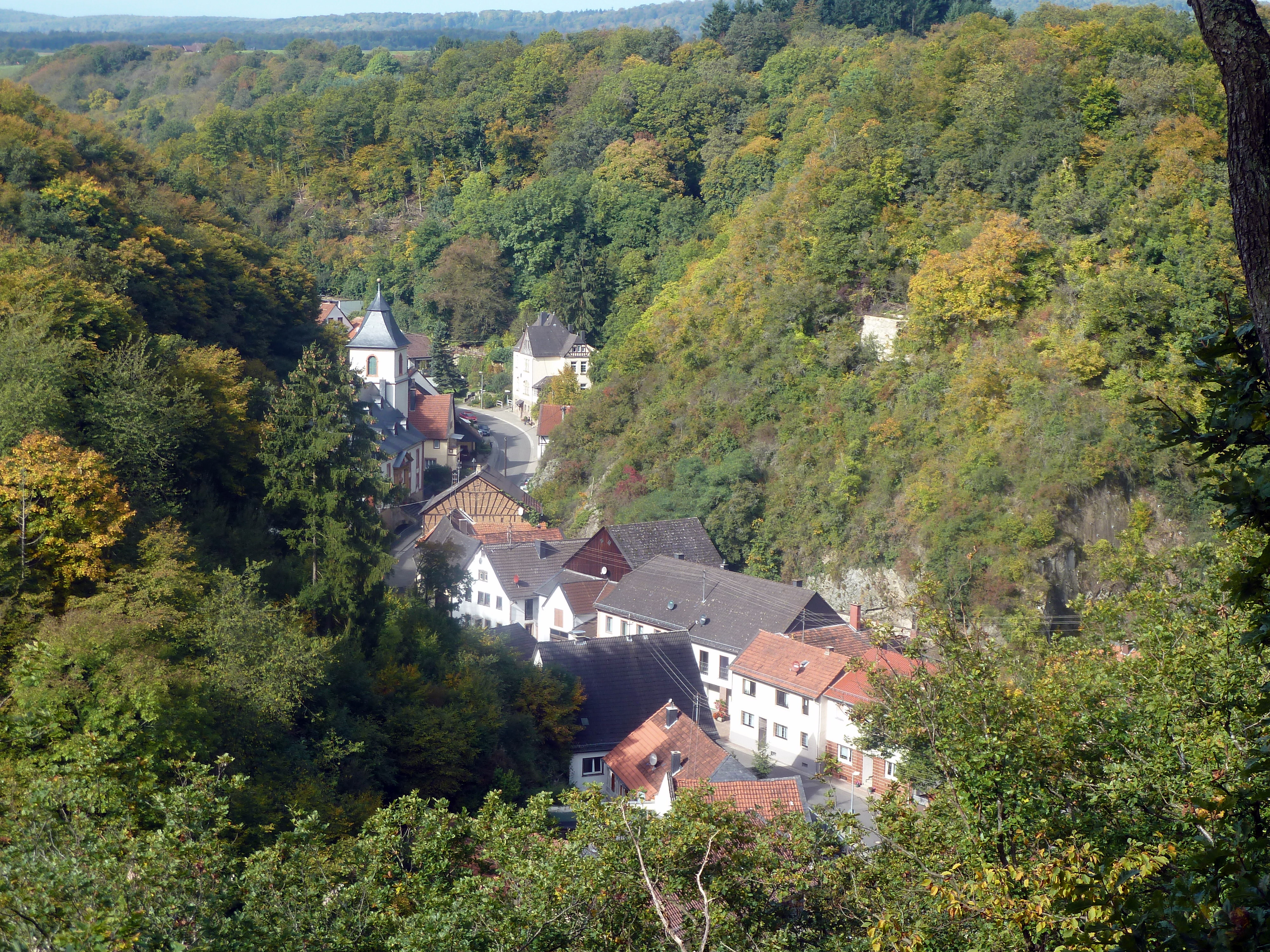

- Coat of arms

- Location of Winterburg within Bad Kreuznach district
- Interactive map of Winterburg
- Location within Germany Location within Rhineland-Palatinate
- Coordinates: 49°51′46″N 7°39′3″E
- Country: Germany
- State: Rhineland-Palatinate
- District: Bad Kreuznach
- Municipal assoc.: Nahe-Glan

Government
  - Mayor (2019–24): Petra Woll

Area
  - Total: 2.56 km^{2} (0.99 sq mi)
- Elevation: 290 m (950 ft)

Population (2025-12-31)
  - Total: 184
  - Density: 71.9/km^{2} (186/sq mi)
- Time zone: UTC+01:00 (CET)
  - Summer (DST): UTC+02:00 (CEST)
- Postal codes: 55595
- Dialling codes: 06756
- Vehicle registration: KH

Winterburg is a municipality in the district of Bad Kreuznach in Rhineland-Palatinate, in western Germany.
