= Hennweiler =

- Municipality
- Coat of arms

- Location of Hennweiler within Bad Kreuznach district
- Interactive map of Hennweiler
- Location within Germany Location within Rhineland-Palatinate
- Coordinates: 49°49′12″N 7°26′06″E
- Country: Germany
- State: Rhineland-Palatinate
- District: Bad Kreuznach
- Municipal assoc.: Kirner Land

Government
  - Mayor (2019–24): Michael Schmidt

Area
  - Total: 14.11 km^{2} (5.45 sq mi)
- Elevation: 370 m (1,210 ft)

Population (2025-12-31)
  - Total: 1,207
  - Density: 85.54/km^{2} (221.6/sq mi)
- Time zone: UTC+01:00 (CET)
  - Summer (DST): UTC+02:00 (CEST)
- Postal codes: 55619
- Dialling codes: 06752
- Vehicle registration: KH
- Website: www.hennweiler.de

Hennweiler is an Ortsgemeinde – a municipality belonging to a Verbandsgemeinde, a kind of collective municipality – in the Bad Kreuznach district in Rhineland-Palatinate, Germany. It belongs to the Verbandsgemeinde Kirner Land, whose seat is in the town of Kirn.

== Geography ==
=== Location ===
Hennweiler lies in the southern Hunsrück. Looming north of the municipality is the Lützelsoon plateau, while to the west lies the Hahnenbach valley. East of the village is found the Kellenbach valley. A few kilometres to the south, the Hunsrück falls off into the Nahe valley. Hennweiler lies roughly 31 km west of the district seat of Bad Kreuznach, 15 km northeast of Idar-Oberstein and a like distance west-northwest of Bad Sobernheim. Hennweiler's municipal area, measuring slightly over 14 km^{2}, is the biggest in the Verbandsgemeinde of Kirn-Land, and more than half of it is wooded. The village's elevation is 374 m above sea level. The village is well linked with its neighbours and the broader highway netweork by three Kreisstraßen. Hennweiler has some 1,400 inhabitants.

=== Neighbouring municipalities ===
Clockwise from the north, Hennweiler's neighbours are the municipalities of Schlierschied, Kellenbach, Heinzenberg, Oberhausen bei Kirn, Hahnenbach, Sonnschied, Bruschied and Woppenroth. The first and last named municipalities lie in the neighbouring Rhein-Hunsrück-Kreis while Sonnschied, whose boundary with Hennweiler amounts to only a few metres, lies in the neighbouring Birkenfeld district. Hennweiler also comes to within a few metres of the municipality of Brauweiler, but does not actually touch it.

=== Constituent communities ===
Also belonging to Hennweiler are the outlying homesteads of Algendellerhof and Schlößchen Wasem.

== History ==
Hennweiler's vast municipal area (1 411 ha) has been settled since earliest times. Archaeological research has been able to prove that there was human habitation in the area between 600 and 400 BC. With the Roman takeover of the Rhine’s left bank in the last century of the pre-Christian era, the time that followed brought the Treveri, a people of mixed Celtic and Germanic stock, cultural dominance, but enrichment, too. Various archaeological finds in Hennweiler from Celtic and Roman times bear witness to settlers who were members of these two peoples. In 992, Hennweiler had its first documentary mention in a charter by king Otto III: the king, under Archbishop of Mainz Willigis’s aegis (for Otto was still a boy at the time), donated the royal estate of Hanenwilare to the only recently founded Saint Stephen’s Foundation in Mainz. It is quite likely that under this foundation's influence, the building of the parish church, Saint Stephen’s (Stephanus Kirche), as the mother church in the parish of Hennweiler came about. This parish region was in the Middle Ages coterminous with the Vogtei of Hennweiler, which comprised, as a judicial and administrative body, the villages of Hennweiler, Oberhausen, Guntzelnberg, Rode, Heinzenberg and the estate of Eigen. The centres of Guntzelnberg and Rode, which lay at the limit of the Hahnenbach and Bruschied estate areas, are believed to have been forsaken and to have vanished even before the Thirty Years' War (1618–1648). The Vogtei of Hennweiler, as a fief of the Counts of Veldenz, was given in the 13th or 14th century to the Lords of Heinzenberg. This administrative body, now called the Amt of Hennweiler, along with another, the Amt of Hahnenbach, formed the Imperial lordship of Wartenstein, whose seat was at Castle Wartenstein. In the 16th century, the Lords of Schwarzenberg were the local lords, as was later the baronial family of Warsberg in the 17th and 18th centuries. Under the Lords of Schwarzenberg, a market was introduced in 1555. About the middle of the 18th century, Hennweiler began to see considerable population growth and expansion. In the summer of 1781, though, on 28 August, more than two thirds of the village burnt down in a great fire. In the years 1790–1792, the parish church’s nave was reconstructed. After French Revolutionary troops had overrun and occupied the German lands on the Rhine’s left bank, the French imposed a new administrative order on the French Revolutionary model. Indeed, there were French administrative reforms in 1798, 1800 and 1802. Under Napoleonic French rule, the local people became French under French law from 1802 to 1813 or 1814. Hennweiler belonged to the Mairie (“Mayoralty”) of Kirn in the Arrondissement of Simmern, which itself belonged to the Department of Rhin-et-Moselle. After French rule ended, there was a short transitional time after which the new political order laid out by the Congress of Vienna came into force. Under its terms, Hennweiler was grouped into the Kingdom of Prussia, wherein it found itself in the Kreuznach district. The Mairie of Kirn became the Bürgermeisterei (also “Mayoralty”) of Kirn. From 1858, the outlying rural municipalities formed their own rural mayoralty, but this was governed in “personal union” by the mayor of the town of Kirn. This arrangement was abolished in 1896 and the representatives of the rural villages elected their own mayor. On 1 October 1968, what had hitherto been known as an Amt now came to be called a Verbandsgemeinde. In the course of administrative restructuring in Rhineland-Palatinate, Hennweiler became one of 20 municipalities in the Verbandsgemeinde of Kirn-Land in 1969.

=== Municipality’s name ===
The village's name likely goes back to a Frankish settler's name, which might have been “Hagano” or “Hano”. He might have founded a settlement here in the time of the Frankish taking of the land in the 6th and 7th centuries. On the other hand, he might also have given an existing settlement his own name.

=== Jewish history ===
Hennweiler had a Jewish community until 1938 or 1939. It arose in the 18th century. Already by 1680, though, individual Jews were being mentioned as being in the village. It was in that year that the first mention of a jüdte (in up-to-date German, Jude) came. He apparently had some protection money to pay. In 1685, a “Jud Heim” was mentioned. In the 18th century, the number of Jews in the village grew. There came to be four Jewish families in Hennweiler. In 1749, the lordship of the Lords of Warsberg decreed a Judenordnung (a replacement of the old Schutzjude status) for the Amt of Wartenstein. In 1753, the Synagogenordnung (“synagogue order”) for the synagogue in Hennweiler was signed by Abraham (head of the Hennweiler Jewish community), Löb Nathan (also from Hennweiler), Hertz, Gümpell, Abraham Jacob (all from Schneppenbach), Löb, Manche Samuel, Mayer and Itzig (all from Bruschied). The frightful great fire on 28 August 1781, which burnt down two thirds of Hennweiler (60 houses, barns and stables) and also killed some people, also hit the village's Jewish families very hard. Feist Isaac's and Jospel Moises's families were left homeless when their houses were lost in the fire. The synagogue burnt down, too. In the 19th century, the number of Jewish inhabitants developed as follows: in Hennweiler about 1850, 70 Jewish inhabitants; in 1895, 42 (5.3% of all together 789 inhabitants); in Bruschied in 1895, 16 Jewish inhabitants (5.4% of 295). The Jewish families living in Bruschied, who had been part of the Gemünden Jewish community since 1814, were now grouped into the Hennweiler community. In the way of institutions, there were a synagogue (see Synagogue below), a mikveh and a graveyard (see Jewish graveyard below). To provide for the community's religious needs, a schoolteacher was hired for a time, who also busied himself as the hazzan and the shochet. About 1924, when the Jewish community numbered 36 persons, the head of the community was J. Vogel. In 1932, it was Salomon Kahn. Working as a teacher in the village was Hermann Elter from Kirn, who taught the children in religion.

In 1933, the year when Adolf Hitler and the Nazis seized power in Germany, there were still 30 Jews living in Hennweiler. In the years that followed, though, some of the Jews emigrated in the face of the boycotting of their businesses, the progressive stripping of their rights and repression, all brought about by the Nazis. On the evening after Kristallnacht (9–10 November 1938), there were excesses in the village at the NSDAP district leader's urging. In the violence that ensued, the synagogue was desecrated, among other things. The last four Jewish families left Hennweiler in August and September 1939 and moved to Cologne or Nuremberg. The last four members of the Jewish community in Bruschied were deported to concentration camps in 1942. According to Yad Vashem's lists and information from the work Gedenkbuch - Opfer der Verfolgung der Juden unter der nationalsozialistischen Gewaltherrschaft in Deutschland 1933–1945 ("Memorial Book – Victims of the Persecution of Jews under the National Socialist Tyranny in Germany 1933–1945"), the following members of Hennweiler's Jewish community fell victim to the Holocaust (along with their birth years):

- Otto Dornhard (1886)
- Laura Goldberg née Braun (1889)
- Rosa (Rosina) Joseph née Scholem (1867)
- Hans Kahn (1915)
- Wilhelm Kahn (1885)
- Emma Nieteckmann née Dornhard (1884)
- Henriette Römer née Sender (1902)
- Siegfried Römer (1924)
- Leopold Schmelzer (1863)
- Sigmund Sender (1873)
- Mathilde Steiner née Braun (1878)
- Wilhelm Vogel (1872)

Likewise, the following members of the outlying community in Bruschied died:

- Johanna Baum née Bonem (1886)
- Samuel Baum (1880)
- Siegmund Baum (1883)
- Florina Braun née Dornhard (1891)
- Alma Dornhard (1924)
- Auguste Dornhardt (1888)
- Kurt Dornhard (1923)

In 1985, in memory of the Jews who were driven out of Hennweiler and murdered, a memorial stone was placed at the municipality's Christian graveyard. Another was set at the mortuary at the graveyard in Bruschied. A former Jewish inhabitant named Max Sender came back to his home village after 1945. He was buried at the Jewish graveyard in 1985.

==== Synagogue ====
At first, the Jewish community had to make do with a simple prayer room that had been set up in one of the Jewish houses. In the Judenordnung decreed by the Warsberg lordship in 1749, it was stipulated that a synagogue was not to be built too near the church. Shortly after 1750, a new synagogue (actually a new prayer room) was established; a new decree, a Synagogenordnung, was made for that to regulate the “ritual character” in the “shul at Hennweiler”. To be able to hold regular services, Jewish inhabitants from Bruschied and Schneppenbach also came to Hennweiler. In the 1781 great fire, the house that contained the prayer room was burnt down. It is not known when the Jewish community managed to set up a new one. It is believed that in the 1830s, community members Joseph Gottschall and his wife Sara acquired a building that could be used to establish a synagogue. For this synagogue, there came in February 1838 from the Israelite Consistory a new edict. By 1868 the building had fallen into disrepair and badly needed to be renovated. In 1895, the building had once again fallen into such disrepair that it was closed by police order. There were plans to build a new synagogue. Since, however, most Jewish families lived in relative poverty, it was thought that, among other things, a door-to-door collection in other Jewish communities in the Regierungsbezirke of Koblenz and Trier might be undertaken to raise the needed funds, but the authorities forbade this. In 1896, approval was granted to build a new synagogue. Master mason Johann Böres, from Hennweiler, built the new place of worship on Obergasse (a lane); the quarrystone and the sand was put at the builders’ disposal by the municipality from its own quarry. The new synagogue was consecrated amid much merrymaking on 22 August 1896. Until the mid 1930s, the Hennweiler synagogue was the hub of the local Hennweiler-Bruschied Jewish community's religious life. The land title register listed the following as the synagogue's owners: Martin Becker (broker), Bernhard Braun (cigar maker), Salomon Kahn (merchant), Alexander Sender (merchant), Max Sender (merchant), Jakob Schmelzer (merchant), Moses Vogel (merchant), Jacob Vogel (merchant), Lazarus Jakobi (merchant), Leopold Binnes (merchant) and Siegmund Sender (merchant), all of whom were from Hennweiler, and Michael Bornhard I (merchant) and Michael Bornhard II (merchant), both of whom were from Bruschied. During the pogrom in November 1938 (actually the evening after Kristallnacht), the synagogue was defiled. The windows and doors were smashed up and the pews were chopped up with axes. The Torah scrolls as well as other written matter, and the Judaica were burnt out in the street. In the spring of 1939, the Jewish community was forced by the Nazis to sell the synagogue property and the Jewish graveyard to the municipality. In the winter of 1939/1940, the synagogue building was further desecrated by being used by Wehrmacht troops as a munitions storage. It was then used from August 1940 to February 1945 as a school gymnasium. After 1945, the building was once more transferred to the municipality according to a decision handed down at restitution proceedings in March 1951. The municipality then sold it to a private citizen, and before the year had ended, the new owner had had it torn down so that a house could be built on the lot. The synagogue's address was Obergasse 29.

==== Jewish graveyard ====
An old graveyard whose whereabouts are today unknown is believed to have lain east of Hennweiler, astride the municipal limit with Oberhausen in the Römerswald (forest). It might have been a joint burial ground for both villages’ Jewish inhabitants. The (new?) Jewish graveyard in Hennweiler was laid out before 1811, presumably about 1800 (the earliest appearance on a map dates from 1811). Beginning in 1895, the Hennweiler graveyard was also used for burials from Bruschied. The graveyard's area was 615 m^{2}. In 1938, it was desecrated by Nazis, the gravestones were thrown about and the fencing was destroyed. In 1939 and 1940, the trees at the graveyard were felled by soldiers stationed in Hennweiler. It was to be cleared and sold off as farmland. Some of the gravestones were stolen, and some used as building material. The last burials there were in 1985 (Max Sender) and 1986 (Benjamin Sender). The graveyard is ringed by a hedge. To the right of the entrance is a great information panel telling of Hennweiler's and Bruschied's former Jewish inhabitants and also containing references to the memorial stones at these two villages’ municipal graveyards.

=== Population development ===
Hennweiler's population development since Napoleonic times is shown in the table below. The figures for the years from 1871 to 1987 are drawn from census data:

Year	Inhabitants
1815	563
1835	686
1871	693
1905	779
1939	885

Year	Inhabitants
1950	925
1961	1,082
1970	1,177
1987	1,211
2005	1,304

== Religion ==
The majority of the inhabitants in Hennweiler are Evangelical. Located in the village is the Hennweiler-Oberhausen Evangelical parish office. The Catholic inhabitants belong to the parish of Oberhausen. The Catholic church was built in 1934. As at 30 September 2013, there are 1,239 full-time residents in Hennweiler, and of those, 674 are Evangelical (54.399%), 423 are Catholic (34.14%), 1 belongs to the Palatinate State Free Religious Community (0.081%), 1 is Russian Orthodox (0.081%), 7 (0.565%) belong to other religious groups and 133 (10.734%) either have no religion or will not reveal their religious affiliation.

== Politics ==
=== Municipal council ===
The council is made up of 16 council members, who were elected by proportional representation at the municipal election held on 7 June 2009, and the honorary mayor as chairman. The 16 seats are shared between two voters’ groups. In 2004, the majority vote system was used to elect council members.

=== Mayor ===
Hennweiler's mayor is Michael Schmidt, and his deputies are Bernd Müller, Monika Schreiner and Andreas Beck.

=== Coat of arms ===
The German blazon reads: Schild gespalten, vorne in Schwarz ein silberner, goldgekrönter, -bewehrter und gezungter Löwe, hinten in Silber eine Orchidee Salep-Orchis (Orchis morio) mit grünen Wurzelknollen, grünem Stengel und sechs roten Blüten.

The municipality's arms might in English heraldic language be described thus: Per pale sable a lion rampant sinister argent armed, langued and crowned Or and argent a green-winged orchid vert flowered of six gules.

The charge on the dexter (armsbearer's right, viewer's left) side, the lion, refers to the Lordship of Wartenstein, an Electoral-Trier fief to the House of Warsberg. The other charge, on the sinister (armsbearer's left, viewer's right) side, the green-winged orchid, enjoys conservational protection within a glade that lies within Hennweiler's limits. Municipal council, on 30 August 1963, gave the graphic artist Brust from Kirn-Sulzbach the task of designing a municipal coat of arms. At a council meeting on 13 April 1965, council adopted the design that had been put forth. After consent by the state archive, the Ministry of the Interior in Mainz granted approval for Hahnenbach to bear its own arms on 14 May 1965. The German blazon does not mention that the lion faces sinister (heraldic left). The municipal banner also bears this coat of arms in the centre.

== Culture and sightseeing ==
=== Buildings ===
The following are listed buildings or sites in Rhineland-Palatinate’s Directory of Cultural Monuments:

- Evangelical church, Hauptstraße – formerly Saint Stephen’s (St. Stephan), Late Baroque aisleless church, marked 1790, architect possibly Court Master Builder Johann Thomas Petri, Kirn, Romanesque former quire tower, latter half of the 13th century
- Saint Stephen’s Catholic Church (Katholische Kirche St. Stephan), Oberhauser Straße – Baroquified quarrystone building, Heimatstil, 1933/1934
- Freiherr-vom-Stein-Straße, Jewish graveyard (monumental zone) – area with some 30 gravestones, latter half of the 19th and earlier half of the 20th century
- Hahnenbacher Straße 4 – former school; with teacher’s dwelling, partly slated timber framing, Heimatstil, marked 1913, Town Master Builder Morgenstern, Kirn
- Hauptstraße 19 – Evangelical rectory; Gothicized clinker brick building, hip roof, 1898; focus of urban construction
- Obergasse 8 – Baroque house with single roof ridge, possibly from the 18th century
- Obergasse 12 – house with single roof ridge; building with half-hip roof, partly timber-frame, 18th or early 19th century
- Obergasse 24 – house with single roof ridge; Late Baroque building with half-hip roof, timber-frame, possibly from 1783–1785
- Mausoleum, north of the village – small square building with cupola, original door, early 20th century

=== Natural monuments ===
Up in the heights of the Lützelsoon, a small, outlying bit of the Hunsrück (the name prefix Lützel— is cognate with the English word “little”, but is no longer used as an everyday, standalone word), is a natural monument known as the Teufelsfels (literally “Devil’s Crag”). Standing there is a lookout tower from which there is an outstanding view over the Lützelsoon, the Hunsrück and the surrounding villages.

=== Folklore ===
The local folklore includes a legend that explains not only the local crag's name (see above), but also, purportedly, a German saying. The Legend of the Teufelsfels is as follows:

Many, many years ago, it struck the devil that no more people from Bundenbach were coming to hell. This annoyed him greatly. His grandmother, however, had some advice: “The people there must surely have built themselves a church and no longer wish even to know about us. Walk there quickly and take along a hefty stone and throw it right at the middle of that church!” The devil did not need to be told this twice, found himself a hefty stone and set off for Bundenbach. As it was very hot, he stopped for a rest on the heights of the mountains to catch his breath. Then came a little woman along the way and she was frightened by this man whom she did not know and who, as she could well see, was up to no good. He, though, was pleased that at last he had somebody to ask the way, and he spoke to her in a friendly voice: “Good lady, could you perhaps point me the way to Bundenbach? How far is it from here?” She answered, “Kind sir, I have come straight from there. It is an awfully long way. Here, look at this,” and she opened the basket that she was carrying on her arm. “All these shoes and slippers I have already worn through, so far is it.” At this, the devil put down his hefty stone and stormed off in a huff, quite beside himself. This sly little woman, though, was the Bundenbach cobbler’s wife who had been going about gathering up business for her husband. Some believe that the saying Weiberschläu stört Teufelei! (roughly “A woman’s shrewdness thwarts devilishness”) comes from this.

For another folktale about the Teufelsfels, see here.

=== Sport and leisure ===
A cycle and hiking path network, a multipurpose playground, a fitness and leisure area, and many other hiking destinations exist nearby, such as the Teufelsfels (see above) or Schloß Wartenstein (castle). All are available to inhabitants and visitors alike.

=== Regular events ===
On the first Tuesday in every month, hikes are led by the Lützelsoon tourism and beautification club. On the second Wednesday in every month, it is open-house day at the historical craftsmen's shops from 14:00 to 18:30. Each year in late July, the Hennweiler Markt (market), an event full of tradition, is held in the village.

=== Clubs ===
The following clubs are active in Hennweiler:

- Evangelischer Kirchenchor — Evangelical church choir
- FC Viktoria e.V. — football club
- Förderverein Lützelsoon — Lützelsoon promotional association
- Fremdenverkehrs- und Verschönerungsverein — tourism and beautification club
- Freunde und Förderer der freiwilligen Feuerwehr — “friends and promoters of the volunteer fire brigade
- Humpensänger — musical group
- Kirchbauverein — church-building club
- Mandolinen- und Gitarrenorchester — mandolin and guitar orchestra
- MGV 1862 Hennweiler — men’s singing club
- MGV Hennweiler Kinderchor “Soonwaldspatzen” — children’s singing club
- Motorclub e.V.
- Radfahrverein “Schwalbe” — cycling club
- Schachclub e.V. — chess club
- Schützenverein 1968 e.V. — shooting club
- SPD-Ortsverein Lützelsoon — Social Democratic Party of Germany local chapter
- Turnverein 1895 e.V. — gymnastic club
- VdK Ortsgruppe — social advocacy group, local chapter

== Economy and infrastructure ==
=== Economic structure ===
The municipality of Hennweiler foresees the opening of further building zones and the attendant growth in its economy.

=== Education ===
Located in Hennweiler is a primary school whose catchment area comprises five municipalities. The Lützelsoonschule, as it is called, is a two-stream primary school with some 150 pupils from Hennweiler, Oberhausen, Hahnenbach, Bruschied and Schneppenbach. The big, modern sport hall and the broad, near-natural playground in the outer areas round out the school’s offerings. The daycare centre in Hennweiler is a communal institution represented through the municipality. It has 75 places for children from Hennweiler, Bruschied, Schneppenbach and Hahnenbach. The three mixed-age groups are tended by skilled staff. There is an all-day option for two- to six-year-old children with lunch. This daycare centre has been awarded the FELIX several times – a mark of recognition in Germany for musical facilities.

=== Transport ===
Running through Hennweiler is Kreisstraße 5, and within the village, two other Kreisstraßen – 3 and 4 – branch off. Kreisstraße 4 leads roughly northeast, linking with Bundesstraße 421 at Kellenbach, while Kreisstraße 5 leads south to Kirn, with its various highway connections. Hennweiler is not very favourably placed for Autobahn access. The nearest interchange, onto the A 61 (Koblenz–Ludwigshafen), is at Rheinböllen, some 25 km away. Serving nearby Kirn is a railway station on the Nahe Valley Railway (Bingen–Saarbrücken).
