= Schneppenbach =

- Municipality
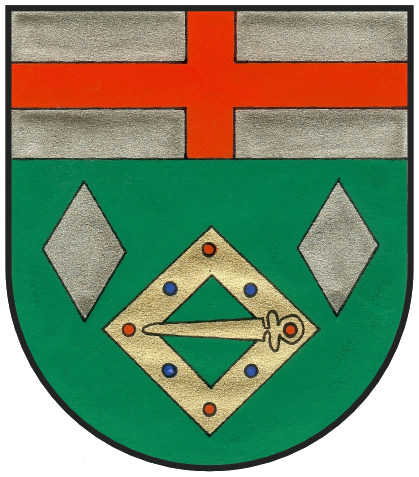
- Coat of arms

- Location of Schneppenbach within Bad Kreuznach district
- Interactive map of Schneppenbach
- Location within Germany Location within Rhineland-Palatinate
- Coordinates: 49°50′40″N 7°24′20″E
- Country: Germany
- State: Rhineland-Palatinate
- District: Bad Kreuznach
- Municipal assoc.: Kirner Land

Government
  - Mayor (2019–28): Markus Fey

Area
  - Total: 3.30 km^{2} (1.27 sq mi)
- Elevation: 424 m (1,391 ft)

Population (2025-12-31)
  - Total: 223
  - Density: 67.6/km^{2} (175/sq mi)
- Time zone: UTC+01:00 (CET)
  - Summer (DST): UTC+02:00 (CEST)
- Postal codes: 55608
- Dialling codes: 06544
- Vehicle registration: KH
- Website: www.schneppenbach.de

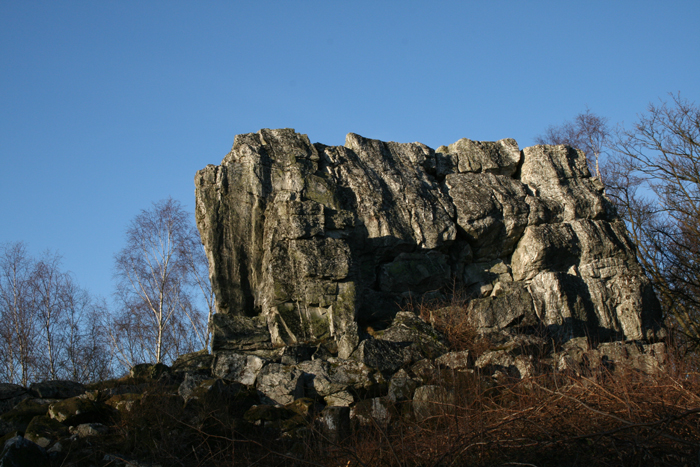
The Teufelsfels (568 m)

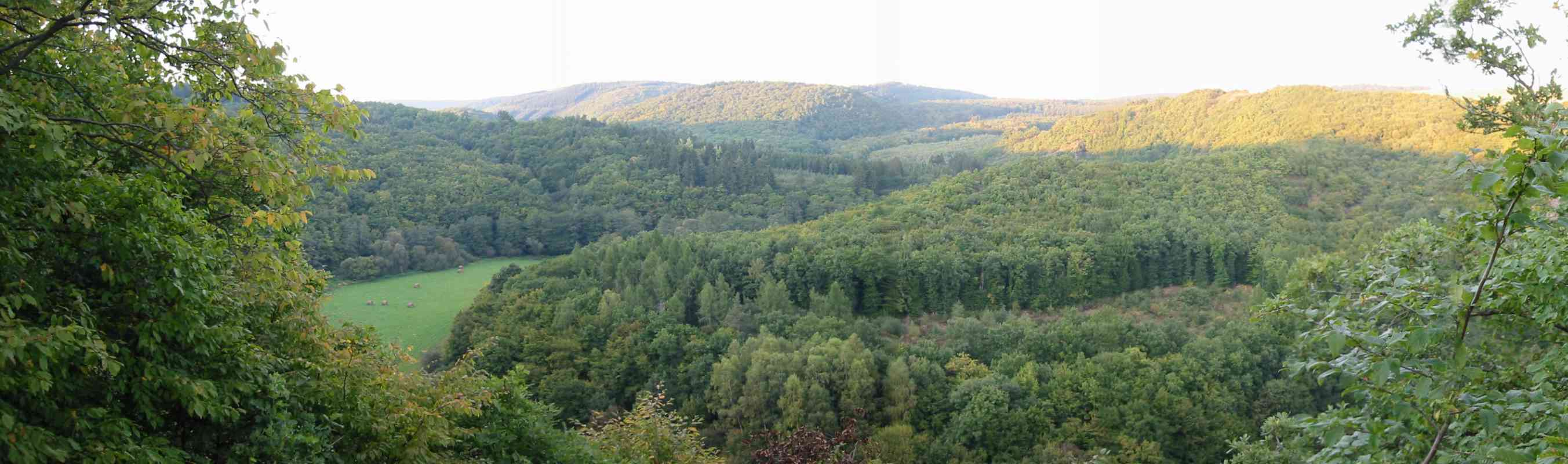
Hahnenbach valley

Schneppenbach is an Ortsgemeinde – a municipality belonging to a Verbandsgemeinde, a kind of collective municipality – in the Bad Kreuznach district in Rhineland-Palatinate, Germany. It belongs to the Verbandsgemeinde Kirner Land, whose seat is in the town of Kirn.

== Geography ==
=== Location ===
Schneppenbach lies in the southern Hunsrück on the western edge of the Lützelsoon ridge and east of (above) the Hahnenbach valley. The nearest major towns are Idar-Oberstein (17 km to the south-southwest) and Simmern (17 km to the north-northeast). Schneppenbach sits at an elevation of 424 m above sea level.

=== Neighbouring municipalities ===
Clockwise from the north, Schneppenbach's neighbours are the municipalities of Woppenroth, which lies in the neighbouring Rhein-Hunsrück-Kreis, Bruschied, which lies in the Bad Kreuznach district, and Bundenbach, which lies in the neighbouring Birkenfeld district.

== History ==
From the Early Middle Ages, Schneppenbach belonged to a major landhold of Saint Maximin's Imperial Abbey at Trier. The 2,742-hectare landhold comprised, besides the centres of Blickersau and Kaffeld, which later vanished, the villages of Woppenroth, Bundenbach, Schneppenbach, Bruschied and the main centre and parish seat of Hausen bei Rhaunen. Until the 18th century, Schneppenbach was administratively tightly bound with the Schmidtburg (castle), which nowadays stands within the village's municipal limits. The castle, whose beginnings go back at least as far as 929, and possibly as far as 926, is one of the oldest in the Nahe-Hunsrück region and is believed to have been the family seat of the Counts in the Nahegau, the Emichones. Their coheirs and rightful successors, the Waldgraves, owned the castle in the 12th and 13th centuries. Internal Waldgravial family disputes, however, resulted in ownership being transferred about 1330 to Archbishop and Elector of Trier Baldwin of Luxembourg. Under Baldwin, the castle was expanded, and in the time that followed, it became the seat of the Electoral-Trier Amt of Schmidtburg. While Bundenbach was the only village in the Amt that stood wholly under Electoral-Trier sovereignty, Bruschied and Schneppenbach formed a condominium and belonged jointly to the Electorate of Trier and the Knights of Wildberg. When the Amt of Schmidtburg was pledged to the Electoral-Trier Amtmann Nikolaus von Schmidtburg sometime before 1554, he temporarily introduced Calvinism. By 1626, though, the villages had reverted to Catholicism. In 1563, there were nine households in Schneppenbach, five in 1684 and eleven in 1715 that belonged to the Electoral-Trier Amt of Schmidtburg. About 1650, records show that the local lord was the knight Sir Cratz von Scharffenstein. Schneppenbach formed together with Bruschied an Ingericht (local court district). The two villages' inhabitants only owned one chapel, and attended the main services in Bundenbach. In 1794, during the War of the First Coalition, the German lands on the Rhine's left bank were occupied by the French, and in 1798, the region was reorganized on the French administrative model by the French Directory. With this French administrative reform, the Amt of Schmidtburg was dissolved. Schneppenbach passed to the then newly founded Mairie ("Mayoralty") of Kirn in the Arrondissement of Simmern and the Department of Rhin-et-Moselle, remaining there for the rest of French Revolutionary and Napoleonic times. Then, in 1817, it passed to the Bürgermeisterei ("Mayoralty") of Gemünden in the Prussian Simmern district. In the course of administrative restructuring in Rhineland-Palatinate after the Second World War, Schneppenbach was assigned to the Verbandsgemeinde of Kirn-Land.

=== Jewish history ===
For information about Schneppenbach's former small Jewish community, which was bound with the one in Hennweiler, see the Jewish history section in that article.

=== Criminal history ===
Like many places in the region, Schneppenbach can claim to have had its dealings with the notorious outlaw Schinderhannes (or Johannes Bückler, to use his true name). On 25 February 1799 at five o'clock in the morning, the Gendarmerie raided the Budzliese-Amie, a house nestled in rustic charm in Schneppenbach, and there managed to arrest Schinderhannes. The miller at the Römermühle had given the authorities the "hot tip". The event is commemorated in Carl Zuckmayer's play Schinderhannes in the song "Schinderhanneslied": "Im Schneppenbacher Forste, da geht der Teufel rumdibum...".

=== Population development ===
Schneppenbach's population development since Napoleonic times is shown in the table below. The figures for the years from 1871 to 1987 are drawn from census data:

Year	Inhabitants
1815	225
1835	278
1871	293
1905	278
1939	280

Year	Inhabitants
1950	285
1961	272
1970	294
1987	284
2005	261

== Religion ==
Most of Schneppenbach's inhabitants are Catholic. The Catholic church community belongs to the parish of Saint Francis Xavier (St. Franz Xaver) in Bruschied and is administered by the Oberhausen parish office. The Evangelical inhabitants are tended from Gemünden. As at 31 January 2014, there are 253 full-time residents in Schneppenbach, and of those, 49 are Evangelical (19.368%), 174 are Catholic (68.775%), 1 (0.395%) belongs to another religious group and 29 (11.462%) either have no religion or will not reveal their religious affiliation.

== Politics ==
=== Municipal council ===
The council is made up of 6 council members, who were elected by majority vote at the municipal election held on 7 June 2009, and the honorary mayor as chairman.

=== Mayor ===
Schneppenbach's mayor is Markus Fey.

=== Coat of arms ===
The German blazon reads: Unter silbernem Schildhaupt, darin ein rotes Balkenkreuz, in Grün eine goldene Gewandschließe belegt mit 4 roten und 4 blauen Punkten im Wechsel, begleitet von 2 silbernen Rauten.

The municipality's arms might in English heraldic language be described thus: Vert an arming buckle Or studded with eight roundels, four gules and four azure alternately, between two lozenges argent, on a chief of the fifth a cross of the third.

The cross in chief is a reference to the village's former allegiance to the Electorate of Trier. The buckle refers to the Family Schenk von Schmidtburg, whose painted coat of arms can be seen at the Koblenz State Archive (Abt. 54 S Nr. 226). The lozenges stand for the village's former slate industry. The tincture in the main field, vert (green), stands for the village's wealth of woodland. Municipal council gave the graphic artist Brust from Kirn-Sulzbach the task of designing a municipal coat of arms. At a council meeting on 13 August 1971, council adopted the design that had been put forth. After consent by the state archive, the Ministry of the Interior in Mainz granted approval for Schneppenbach to bear its own arms on 8 October 1981. The municipal banner also bears this coat of arms in the centre.

== Culture and sightseeing ==
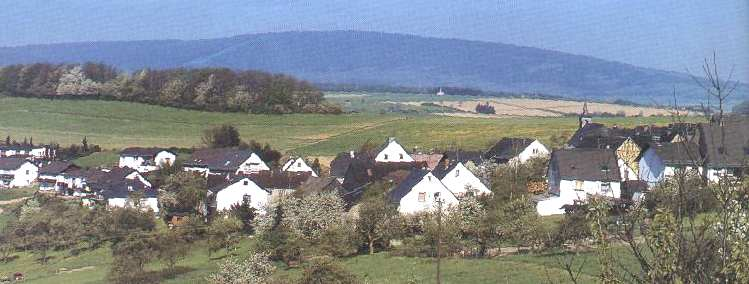
Panorama of Schneppenbach

=== Buildings ===
The following are listed buildings or sites in Rhineland-Palatinate's Directory of Cultural Monuments:

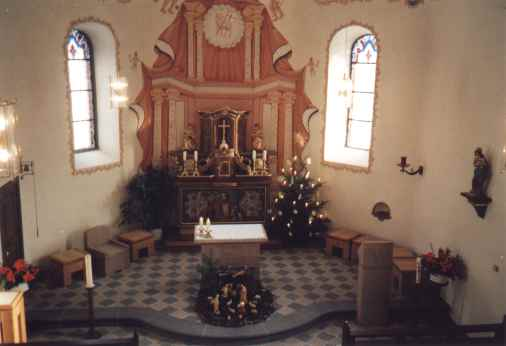
Hauptstraße 39 – Saint John the Baptist's Catholic Church

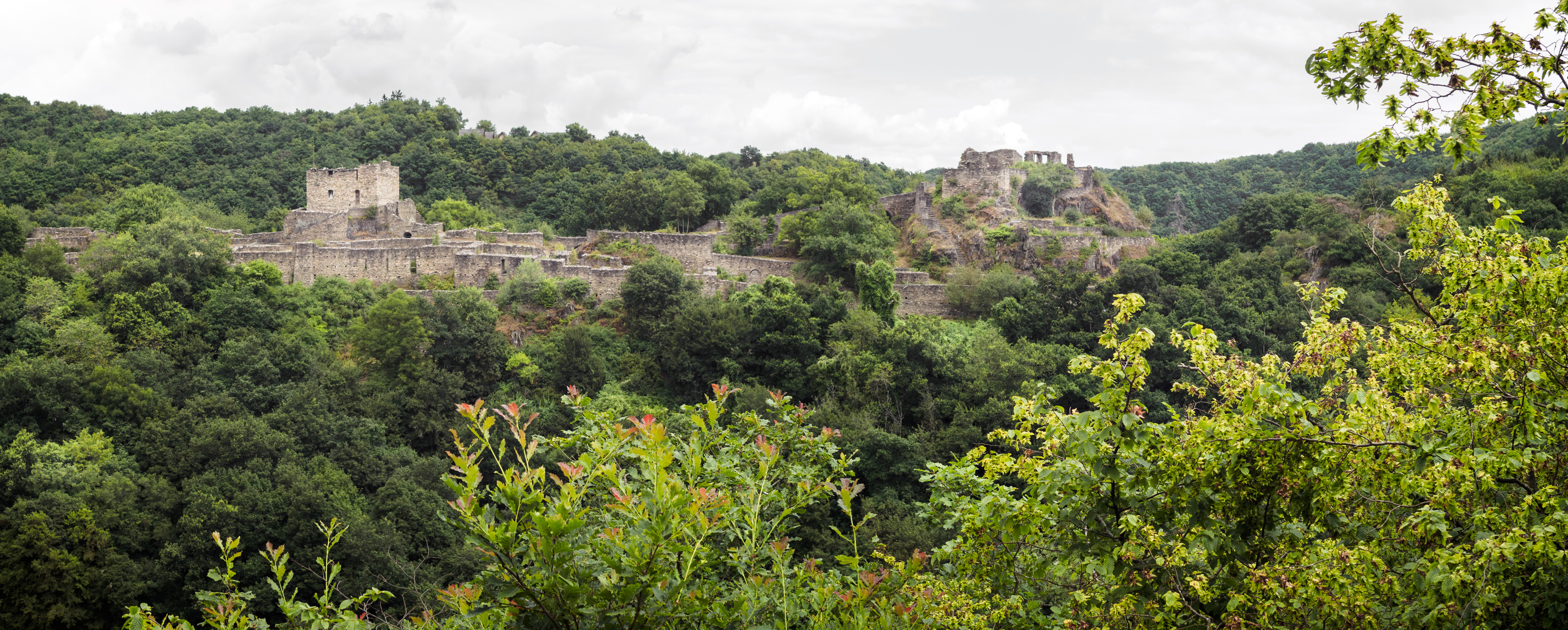
Across the Hahnenbach valley – Schmidtburg ruin

- Saint John the Baptist's Catholic Church (Kirche St. Johannes der Täufer), Hauptstraße 39 – Late Baroque aisleless church, 1768, architect Johann Thomas Petri
- Schmidtburg castle ruin (monumental zone), above the Hahnenbach valley – destroyed in 1689; upper bailey: palas with staircase tower reaching up to second-floor height, after 1328; lower bailey: scant remnants; between baileys a neck ditch and a three-arch bridge

=== More about buildings ===
The chapel in Schneppenbach, which stands under monumental protection, was built in 1768 by the Salm-Kyrburg court master builder Johann Thomas Petri, whose plans also yielded many lordly buildings dating from the 18th century in the Kirn area. The Schmidtburg castle ruin is considered Schneppenbach's foremost landmark and is one of the biggest of the Rhenish castle complexes, and also one of the most important cultural monuments. After excavations and shoring-up work on the ruin that had been almost thoroughly overgrown, visitors now have a clear picture of the imposing complex's size and former importance. Up above the village, at 568 m and right next to the legendary Teufelsfels ("Devil's Crag") stands a lookout tower bearing the same name as this quartzite butte in the Lützelsoon. The Herrenberg Slate Quarry has since 1976 been a show mine with a fossil museum. Also found in Schneppenbach is a La Tène-era Celtic heights settlement called the Altburg.

=== Natural monuments ===
Schneppenbach is home to the still largely untouched, wild Hahnenbach valley, through which leads a water adventure path.

=== Speech ===
The local people speak the Hunsrück dialect with a Moselle Franconian character. The village lies, along with the neighbouring ones, just north of a well known European language boundary, the so-called Das-Dat line, south of which people speak Rhine Franconian. One particular legacy from the High Middle Ages is a number of deviations from Standard High German in the realm of gender, with forms such as die Bach (feminine, but usually der Bach, masculine) and der Butter (masculine, but usually die Butter, feminine) cropping up, which have preserved the state of the language in Walther von der Vogelweide's time. A number of French loanwords can also be found in the local speech, having been adopted in French Revolutionary and Napoleonic times. These include Scheeslong ("sofa", from chaise longue), Trottwa ("sidewalk", from trottoir) and Portmonnee ("wallet", from porte-monnaie). Words with French elements include Bobbeschees (standard: Puppenwagen; "doll's pram") and Kinnerschees (standard: Kinderwagen; "pram"), with the last syllable from French chaise ("chair") in each case.

=== Clubs ===
The following clubs are active in Schneppenbach:

- Spielvereinigung Teufelsfels — gaming union
- Freiwillige Feuerwehr Schneppenbach — volunteer fire brigade
- Hunsrücklerchen — "Hunsrück Larks" singing club
- Fischerei- und Naturschutzverein — fishing and conservation club
- Musikverein "Edelweiß" Schneppenbach — music club

=== Folklore ===
The local folklore includes an old story supposedly still told by the elderly inhabitants of the villages at the foot of the Lützelsoon:

Not a very long time ago, a few forestry workers were busying themselves planting oaks when one of them brought to light a gold belt with his hoe. When he grasped it and tried to put it in his bag, the gold coins fell out of the gold belt and every last one rolled down the slope without his getting hold of even one. In a hollow on the north side of the "Fat Stone", he saw them disappear. All efforts to open up the spot with his hoe, though, came to naught, and he could not reach any of the gold coins. The thought of this wad of money, his "treasure", however, the forestry worker would not give up. Eventually he resolved to set an explosive charge at the spot to reach the treasure. On a moonlit night, he put his plan into action. The explosion was successful, blowing away part of the "Fat Stone". He thought his wish was about to be fulfilled, but at the spot where he had seen the gold disappear, he found nothing, and thus all his work had been for nothing. He sought further for the treasure, but as long and hard as he looked throughout the rest of his life, he found no trace of it. On the north side, the hiker can still see the spot where the golddigger used explosives in his vain attempt. Perhaps some hiker's luck will be good, and he will find the mysterious treasure, and recover it and take it away.

For another folktale about the Teufelsfels, see here.

== Economy and infrastructure ==
=== Transport ===
Running through Schneppenbach is Landesstraße 184. This leads north to Landesstraße 162, and both roads then lead to Bundesstraße 421. To the south, Landesstraße 184 links with Landesstraße 182, which leads to Kirn. Serving that town is a railway station on the Nahe Valley Railway (Bingen–Saarbrücken). The travel time on the hourly Regionalexpress trains to Saarbrücken is 1 hour and 10 minutes, while Mainz can be reached in just under an hour. Every other train to and from Frankfurt also runs through to Frankfurt Airport.

== Famous people ==
=== Famous people associated with the municipality ===
- Johann Thomas Petry (or Petri; d. 1799 in Schneppenbach), German master builder
