= Riesweiler =

- Municipality
- Coat of arms

- Location of Riesweiler within Rhein-Hunsrück-Kreis district
- Interactive map of Riesweiler
- Location within Germany Location within Rhineland-Palatinate
- Coordinates: 49°57′35″N 7°33′27″E
- Country: Germany
- State: Rhineland-Palatinate
- District: Rhein-Hunsrück-Kreis
- Municipal assoc.: Simmern-Rheinböllen

Government
  - Mayor (2019–24): Johannes Herrmann

Area
  - Total: 16.81 km^{2} (6.49 sq mi)
- Elevation: 450 m (1,480 ft)

Population (2025-12-31)
  - Total: 809
  - Density: 48.1/km^{2} (125/sq mi)
- Time zone: UTC+01:00 (CET)
  - Summer (DST): UTC+02:00 (CEST)
- Postal codes: 55499
- Dialling codes: 06761
- Vehicle registration: SIM
- Website: www.riesweiler.de

Riesweiler is an Ortsgemeinde – a municipality belonging to a Verbandsgemeinde, a kind of collective municipality – in the Rhein-Hunsrück-Kreis (district) in Rhineland-Palatinate, Germany. It belongs to the Verbandsgemeinde Simmern-Rheinböllen, whose seat is in Simmern.

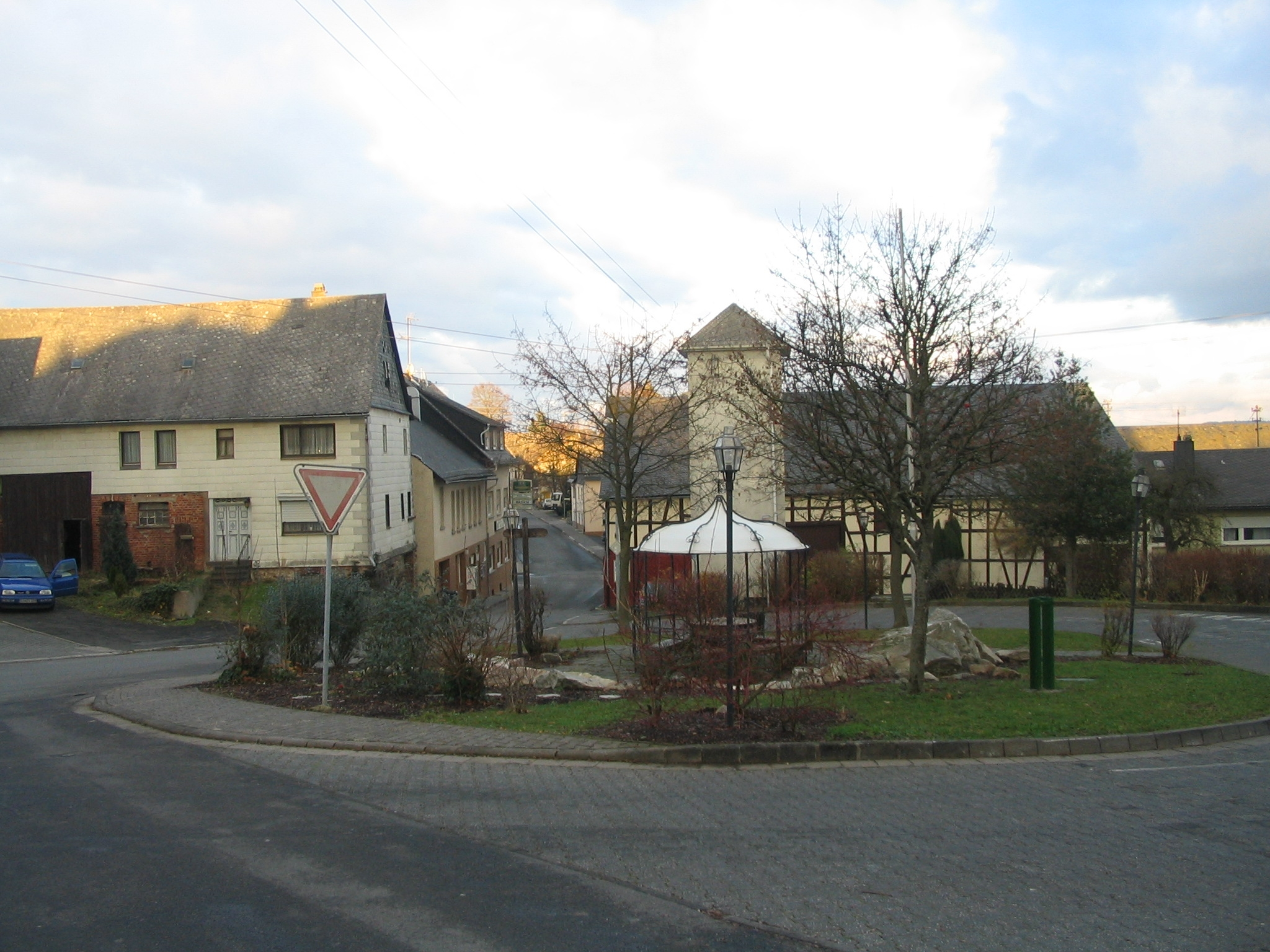
The village centre

== Geography ==
=== Location ===
The municipality lies at the north foot of the Soonwald, a heavily wooded section of the west-central Hunsrück, roughly 2 km southeast of Simmern and 9 km southwest of Rheinböllen. Within Riesweiler’s limits is the district’s highest peak at 653 m above sea level, the Simmerkopf.

== History ==
Riesweiler might have had a Roman past, for it lies on an old Roman road. In 1135, Riesweiler had its first documentary mention. According to historical researchers, though, Riesweiler must already have existed by 995, when the oldest royal estate, “Denzen” was donated by King Otto III to his stalwart, Bezelin. Already in this time, the name Riesweiler (then in the form Riswillri) was cropping up.

The Eremitage Maria Reizenborn near Riesweiler, reconstructed since 1980, was from the 12th to 14th century a resting place on Saint James’s Way, the pilgrimage route to Santiago de Compostela, the section of which running from Frankfurt and Mainz by way of Bingen to Trier crossed the Soonwald ridges between Stromberg and Kirchberg.

The oldest directory of Riesweiler’s inhabitants goes back to 1567. It is a taxation register, and is also the oldest document of this kind dealing with Riesweiler. It lists the taxpayers’ names, and the amounts that they had to pay.

The 17th century brought Riesweiler neediness and hardship. Two wars, the Thirty Years' War and the Nine Years' War (known in Germany as the Pfälzischer Erbfolgekrieg, or War of the Palatine Succession) brought misery, calamity and, for a while, at least, an end to a once blossoming land. At this time, there were 37 houses in Riesweiler.

Monastic lordship was followed by Electoral Palatinate’s rule. Beginning in 1794, Riesweiler lay under French rule. In 1814 it was assigned to the Kingdom of Prussia at the Congress of Vienna.

In the summer of 1813, a fire broke out in Riesweiler that all but destroyed the village. How the fire started and how many houses and buildings were lost was unfortunately not written down. It has been established, however, that only a few houses were left standing, and 55 people were injured in the fire.

In the time of famine in the early 19th century, many people from Riesweiler turned their backs on the village and emigrated.

The First and Second World Wars also left their mark on Riesweiler. In the Second World War, many buildings were destroyed in artillery barrages. Grimmer still was the toll taken on the villagers themselves. Almost every household lost a relative, a loved one or a friend. All together, the two wars claimed 76 lives locally, 19 of whom were listed as missing.

Since 1946, Riesweiler has been part of the then newly founded state of Rhineland-Palatinate.

After the Second World War came reconstruction. Municipal councils at the time quickly recognized the importance of a “growing” village. As early as the 1960s, new building zones were being laid out. At the same time, efforts were brought to bear on modernizing the village centre and building a multipurpose hall, the Soonblickhalle, which was dedicated in 1979.

In the 1980s, a further building zone was laid out, and attention was directed at building a bypass road, which was finished in the early 1990s, affording Riesweiler some relief from through traffic, especially heavy vehicles.

With the building of cycle paths, which are all linked to the Hunsrück cycle path network, and the provision of guest rooms, Riesweiler has grown into something more than simply a local recreational area.

Since the late 1960s, Riesweiler has employed a full-time municipal worker whose job is not simply to oversee and maintain municipal institutions, squares and paths, but also to render services in the municipality.

=== Population development ===
What follows is a table of the town’s population figures for selected years since the early 19th century (each time at 31 December):

Historical population

| Year | Pop. | ±% |
|---|---|---|
| 1815 | 423 | — |
| 1835 | 516 | +22.0% |
| 1871 | 519 | +0.6% |
| 1905 | 583 | +12.3% |
| 1939 | 554 | −5.0% |

| Year | Pop. | ±% |
|---|---|---|
| 1950 | 645 | +16.4% |
| 1961 | 613 | −5.0% |
| 1965 | 618 | +0.8% |
| 1970 | 643 | +4.0% |
| 1975 | 604 | −6.1% |

| Year | Pop. | ±% |
|---|---|---|
| 1980 | 668 | +10.6% |
| 1985 | 651 | −2.5% |
| 1987 | 702 | +7.8% |
| 1990 | 716 | +2.0% |
| 1995 | 747 | +4.3% |

| Year | Pop. | ±% |
|---|---|---|
| 2000 | 726 | −2.8% |
| 2005 | 741 | +2.1% |
| 2006 | 724 | −2.3% |
| 2009 | 745 | +2.9% |

Source: Statistisches Landesamt Rheinland-Pfalz

== Politics ==
=== Municipal council ===
The council is made up of 12 council members, who were elected by proportional representation at the municipal election held on 7 June 2009, and the honorary mayor as chairman.

The municipal election held on 7 June 2009 yielded the following results:

| | SPD | WG | Total |
|---|---|---|---|
| 2009 | - | 12 | 12 seats |
| 2004 | 5 | 7 | 12 seats |

=== Mayor ===
Riesweiler’s mayor is Johannes Herrmann.

=== Coat of arms ===
The municipality’s arms might be described thus: Per fess an endorse argent between sable a lion’s head erased Or langued gules and gules a fleur-de-lis of the first, and argent a tree eradicated vert.

== Culture and sightseeing ==
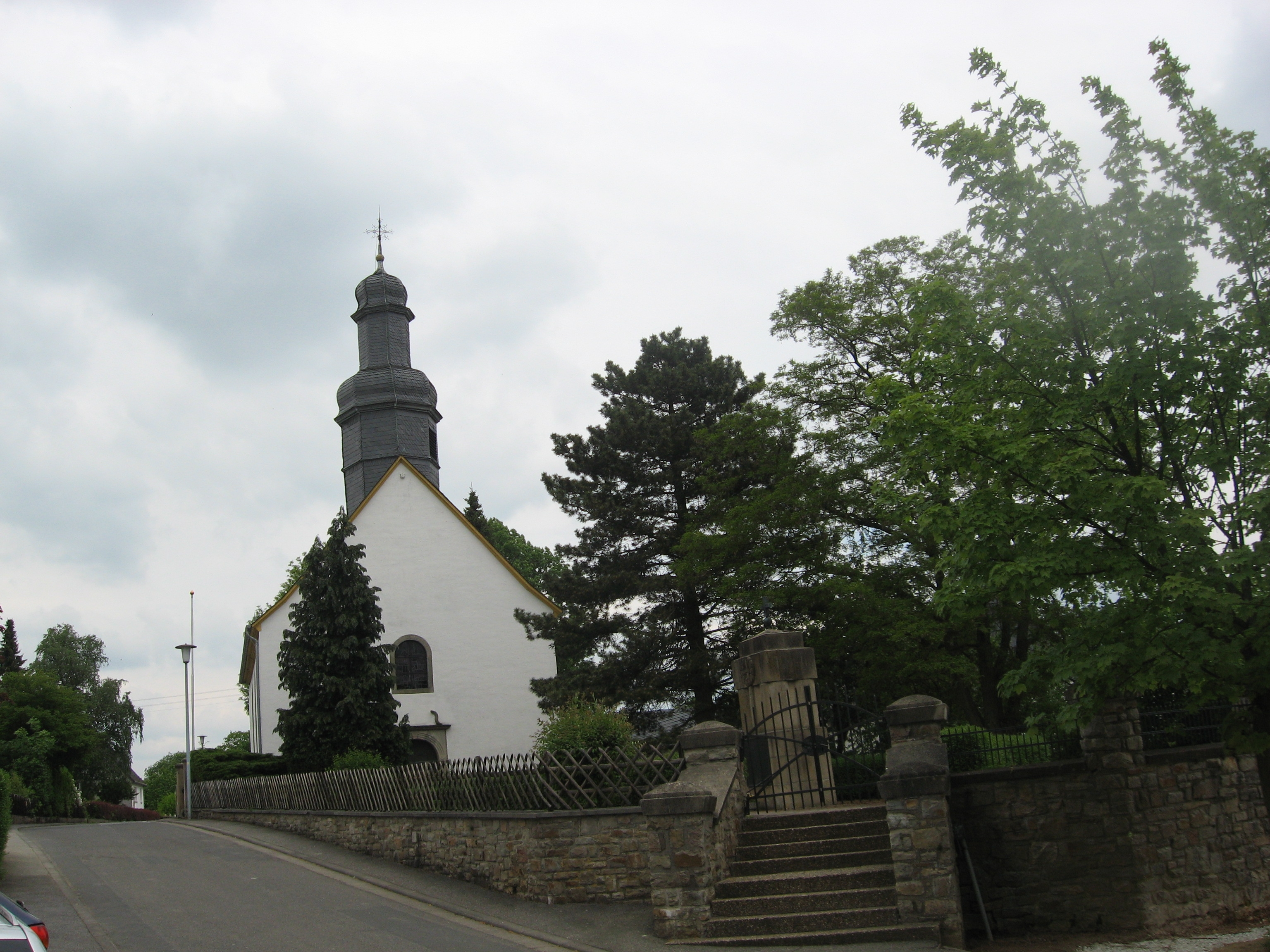
Jahnstraße 2: Evangelical church

=== Buildings ===
The following are listed buildings or sites in Rhineland-Palatinate’s Directory of Cultural Monuments:

- Evangelical church, Jahnstraße 2 – aisleless church, marked 1763; whole complex of buildings with graveyard
- At Gemündener Straße 4 – Classicist door
- At Soonwaldstraße 6 – Classicist door
- Eremitage Maria Reizenborn (monumental zone) – foundation remnants of the pilgrimage church and hermitage, 18th century; spring enclosure (see also below)

=== Eremitage Maria Reizenborn ===
High up in the forest is the Räzebore – a dialectal variant of the name “Reizenborn” – a monument to a hermit. In an outdoor forest church above the hermitage, well attended church services are held in summer under the open sky. According to one theory, the original Celtic inhabitants already had a worshipping place at this spring (the —born part of the name) in pre-Christian times ringed with stone god figures. After Christianization in the Middle Ages, the monumental heads of the idols that remained were taken on orders from Archbishop of Mainz Willigis sometime about 1000 and incorporated into the walls of Riesweiler’s first church, and into its successor buildings as well. One of the sculptures can be seen outside in the west gable, while inside, two others bear the gallery as brackets. Typologically, these ancient works in stone are immediately related to the god figures from Mont Beuvray (Bibracte) and the idols from a Celtic sanctuary in the Seine’s headwaters, now kept at the Musée archéologique in Dijon.

== Economy and infrastructure ==
=== Transport ===
Transport links to the national road network are afforded by Bundesstraße 50, which runs by the village only a few hundred metres away. Riesweiler’s cycle paths are linked to the Hunsrück cycle path network. The Schinderhannes-Soonwald-Radweg (cycle path) runs through the village on its way from Gemünden to Simmern.

== See also ==
Blieskastel also has an outlying centre named "Riesweiler".
