= Eremitage Maria Reizenborn =

Coordinates: 49°56′39.6″N 7°35′13.9″E

The Eremitage Maria Reizenborn, or Räzebore, is a former hermitage in Rhineland-Palatinate, Germany (Hunsrück mountain range). The Hermitage is located on a pilgrimage route of Simmern nearby Spabrücken, which crosses the Soonwald back. This place was chosen by the Monks in the Middle Ages due to the beneficial effect of its legend, because it is where Maria Reizenborn was born, in Hunsrücker Platt Räzebore. It served the pilgrims, as well as the hunters, in the 17th century as a rest stop. A sanctuary built by the Celts in pre-Christian times, in the year 1000, has been found in the Evangelical Church in Riesweiler, walled in by stone figures, which are still visible.

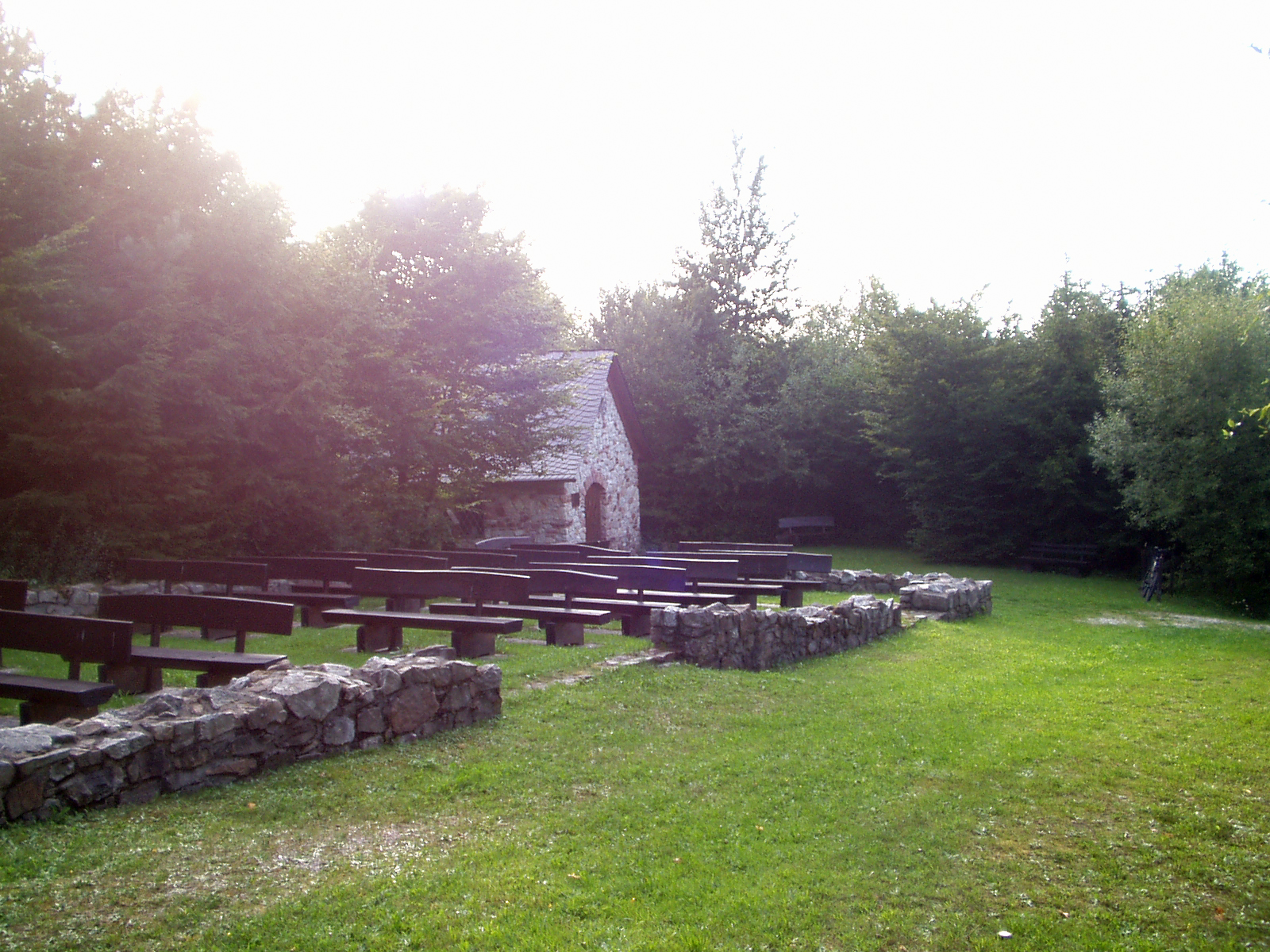
Maria Reizenborn front: foundations of the restored sanctuary

== History ==
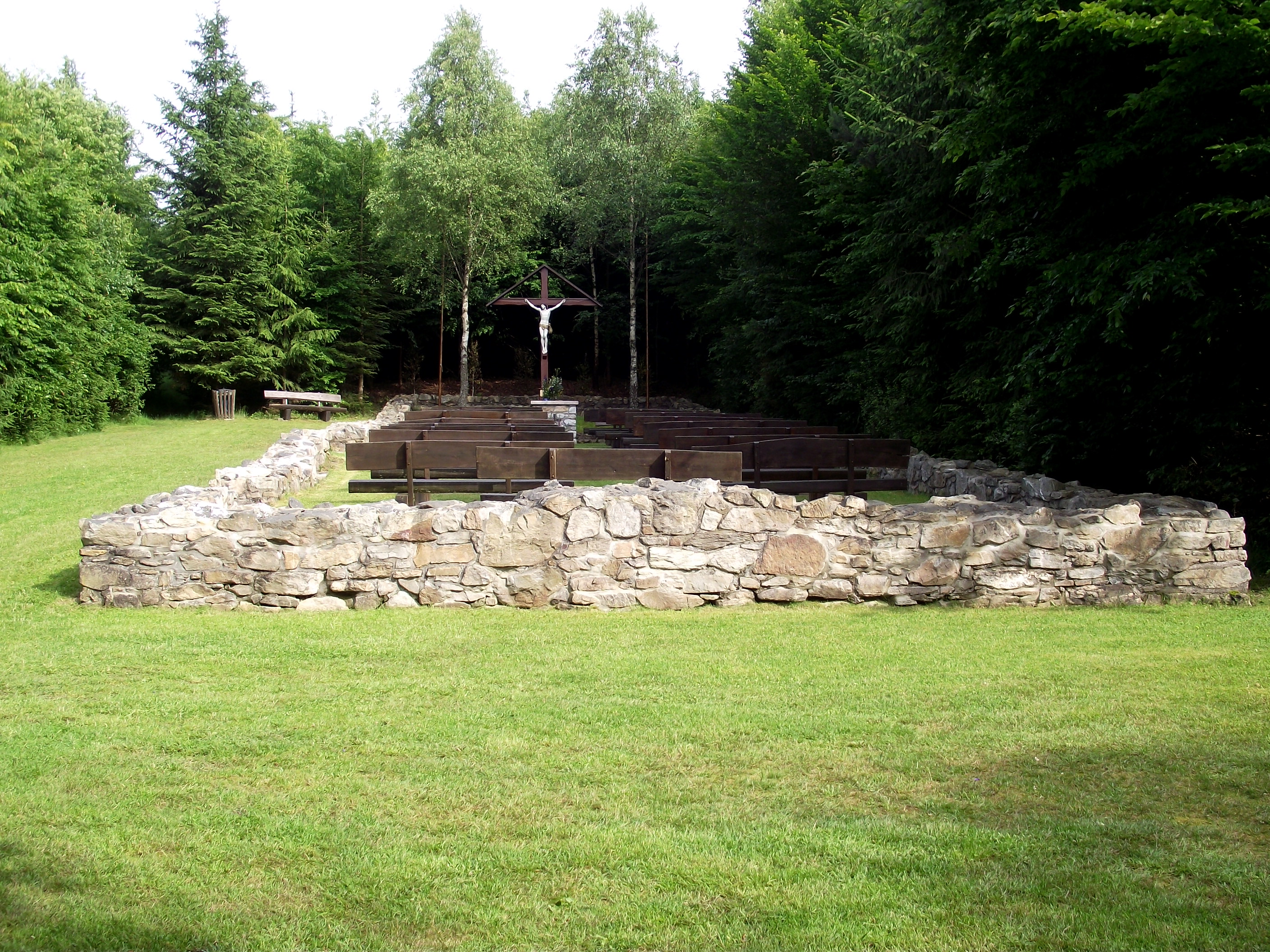
Foundations of the chapel erected in 1732 with the four-metre-high cross

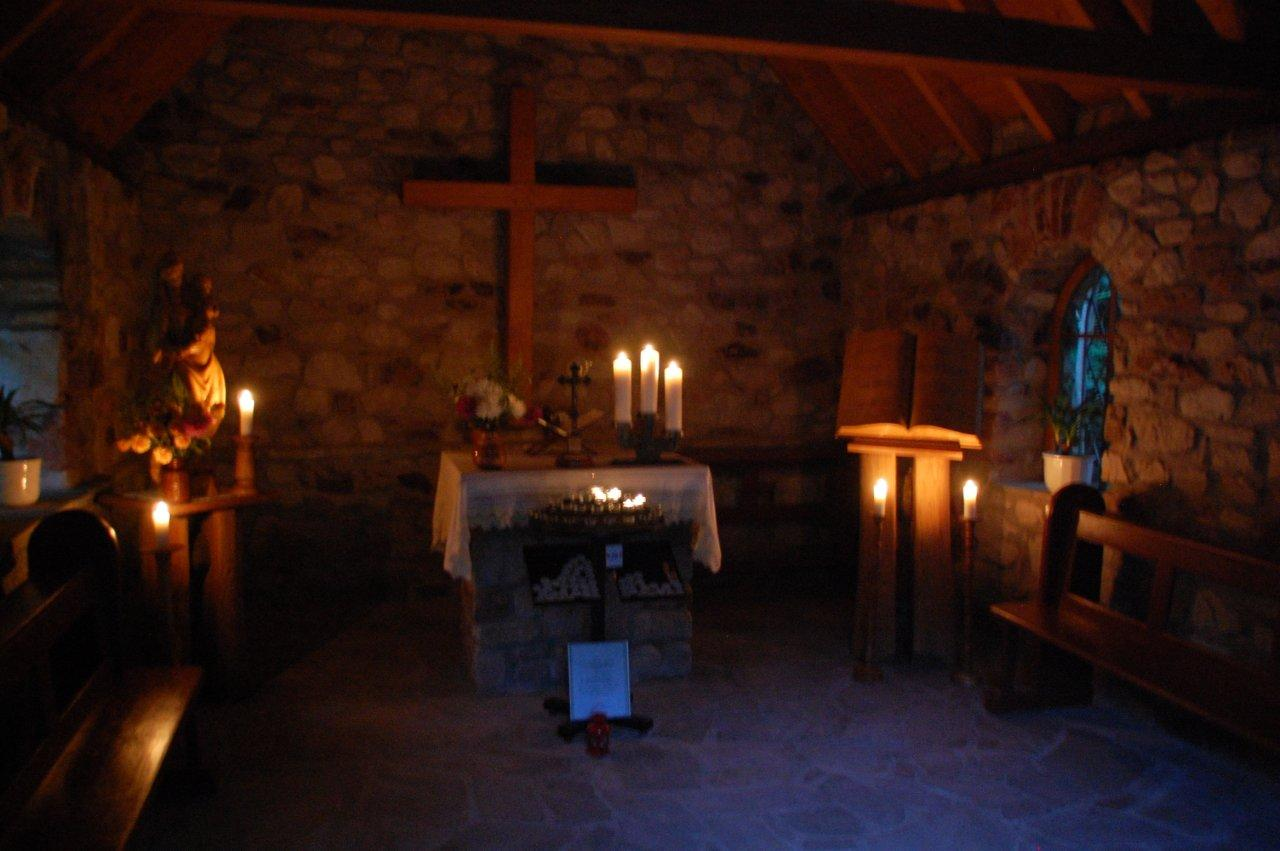
Chapel inside

The first hermit Gerhard occupied the Hermitage site in 1718. In 1732, on Whit Tuesday, a chapel was consecrated. Since 14 August 1732, the resident hermit Bernhard Fritz obtained permission to hold church services and on Whit Tuesday and on Sunday after the Assumption caused pilgrimage processions to be held there. The hermits supported the pilgrimages. The first procession was held a year after the inauguration of the chapel. On 26 April 1736, the first marriage there took place.

In 1744, the Pentecostal procession had set a new record for size, and the hermit Anton Bambach needed 10 guilders to maintain the chapel. Repeatedly visiting pastors from the region of the chapel gave enough to maintain it.

In 1775, near the small hermitage, a large new church was built. Because of the wars against the French in 1796, the Hermitage could not be inhabited. The Hermitage was abandoned in 1796, and it became forgotten over time.

=== Reconstruction from 1980 ===
In early August 1983, the municipality Riesweiler began excavations to search for the foundations of the church and the Hermitage. Between April 1985 and 1986, additional excavations were carried out. The basic foundations of the Hermitage, which amounted to 7.65 by 5.65 metres (25.1 ft × 18.5 ft), were first exposed. A few metres away lay the foundations of the church built in 1775. They were larger than expected. The church had a length of 35.90 metres (117.8 ft) and a width of 9.10 metres (29.9 ft). The chancelry and vestry had a size of 8.80 by 9.10 metres (28.9 ft × 29.9 ft). From the sanctuary, it was one or two steps down into the nave of the church. The foundation walls had a width of 80 centimetres (31 in).

The trees in the foundations have been removed, and the foundations reinforced and increased. In this way, the entire original system is easily visible. In addition, a 4-metre-high (13 ft) and 3-metre-wide (9.8 ft) wooden cross with Christ's body attached was erected in the former sanctuary.

On 7 July 1987, the old sanctuary was inaugurated.

=== After 1990 ===
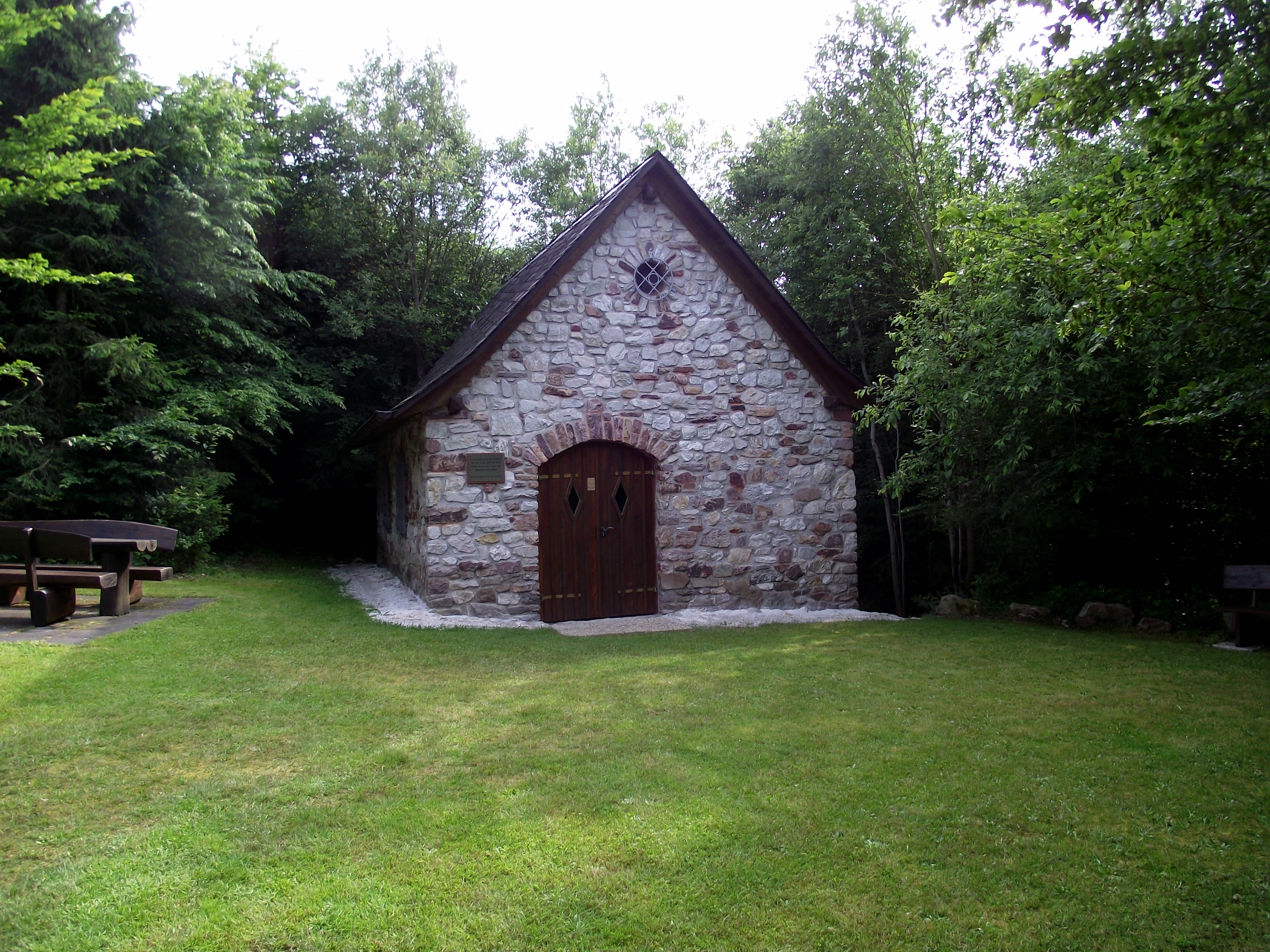
1997 rebuilt on the old foundations Hermitage

On the night from 31 January to 1 February 1990, Hurricane Wiebke uprooted a lot of the spruce that stood in the immediate area near to Räzebore. All the uprooted trees fell on the ground, but the cross in the sanctuary remained intact.

Since 24 June 1997, the chapel on its old foundations was rebuilt by volunteers. The former source has been recast. In early June 1998, the newly built hermitage was fitted with a two-metre-high wooden cross, a Virgin Mary, a Bible, and an altar. Two pews followed a year later. On 8 June 1998, the Hermitage Museum was inaugurated.

On 24 June 2012, there was the occasion of the 25th anniversary Jubilee re-direction of the foundation walls. An ecumenical service in the open air with about 300 participants. This was followed by the anniversary celebration held in the packed hall in Soonblick Riesweiler. The host of the Society for the Promotion of Cultural Heritage Association was Räzebore. The patron of the event was the Mayor of Riesweiler Thomas Auler.

== Other ==
Today, every year in the summer ecumenical services held at this restored site. A silver gilt, 23-centimetre-high (9.1 in) chalice was and is still used today at the Hermitage.

== Literature ==
- Willi Wagner: Ortschronik Riesweiler. Ortsgemeinde Riesweiler 1990, pp. 90
- Anita Kraemer: Der Räzebore - Vergangenheit und Gegenwart, Legende und Wahrheit einer historischen Stätte im Soonwald. Pandion Verlag 2012
