= Womrather Höhe =

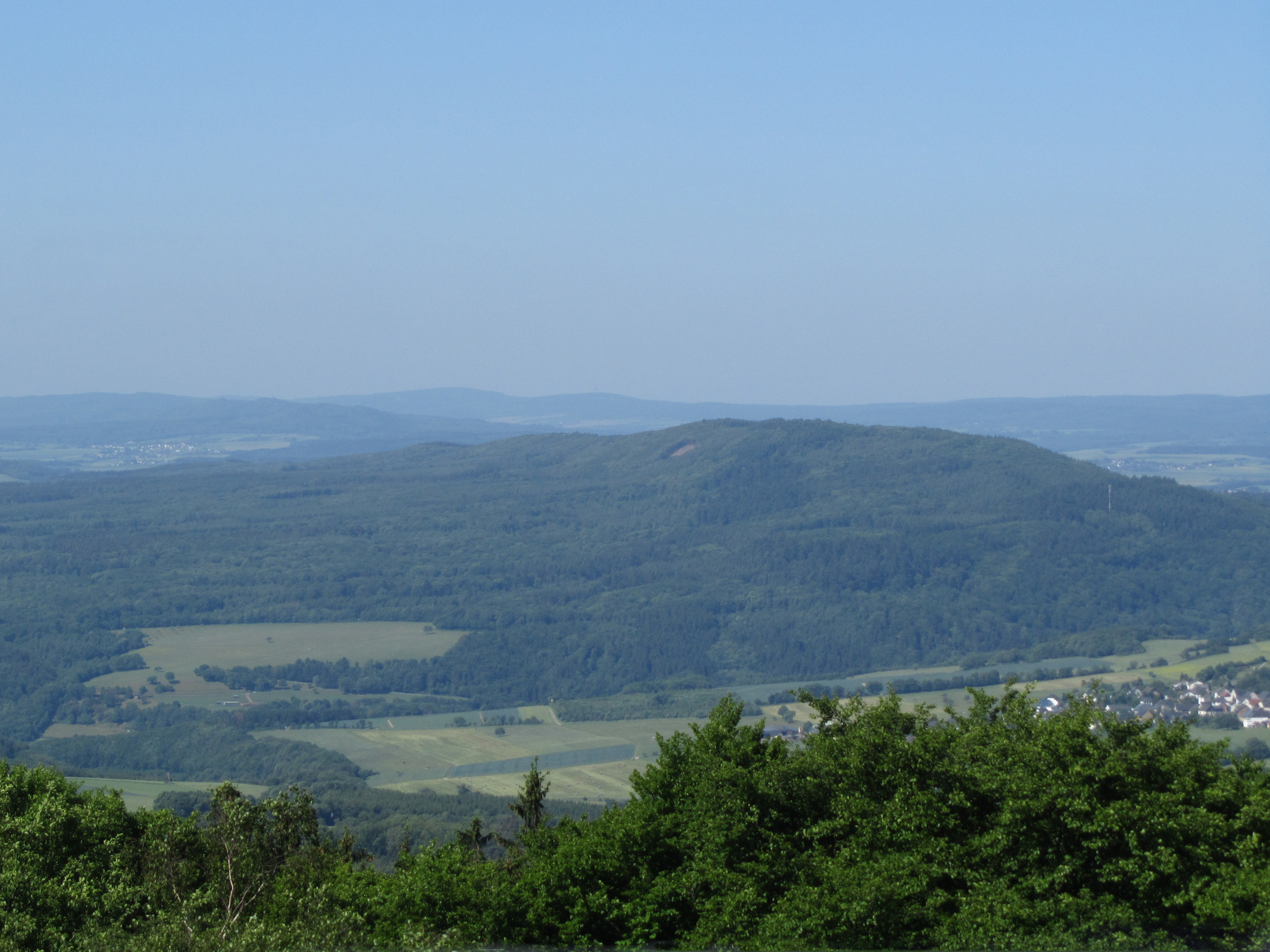
- View over the Lützelsoon from the Alteburg Tower. The Womrather Höhe is the high point of the ridge in the middle distance.

Highest point
- Elevation: 599.1 m above sea level (NN) (1,966 ft)
- Coordinates: 49°51′14″N 7°26′57″E

Geography
- Location within Rhineland-Palatinate
- Location: Rhein-Hunsrück-Kreis und Landkreis Bad Kreuznach, Rheinland-Pfalz, Deutschland
- Parent range: Lützelsoon (Hunsrück)

The Womrather Höhe, at 599.1 m above sea level (NN), is the highest peak in the Lützelsoon hills, which are part of the Hunsrück mountains in Germany's Central Uplands. It is located in the counties of Rhein-Hunsrück-Kreis and Bad Kreuznach in the state of Rhineland-Palatinate.

The forested hill lies on the boundary between Schlierschied (Rhein-Hunsrück-Kreis) to the northwest and Kellenbach (Bad Kreuznach) to the southeast. It was named after the Hunsrück parish of Womrath, 7 kilometres to the north, which owned 3 plots of land in the parish of Schlierschied below the Womrather Höhe until the major exchange of forest estates in the region in 1966.

Views over the Lützelsoon hills and their surrounding area are possible at the observation tower known as Langer Heinrich on the Teufelsfels around 2 kilometres to the southwest.
