= Lützelsoon =

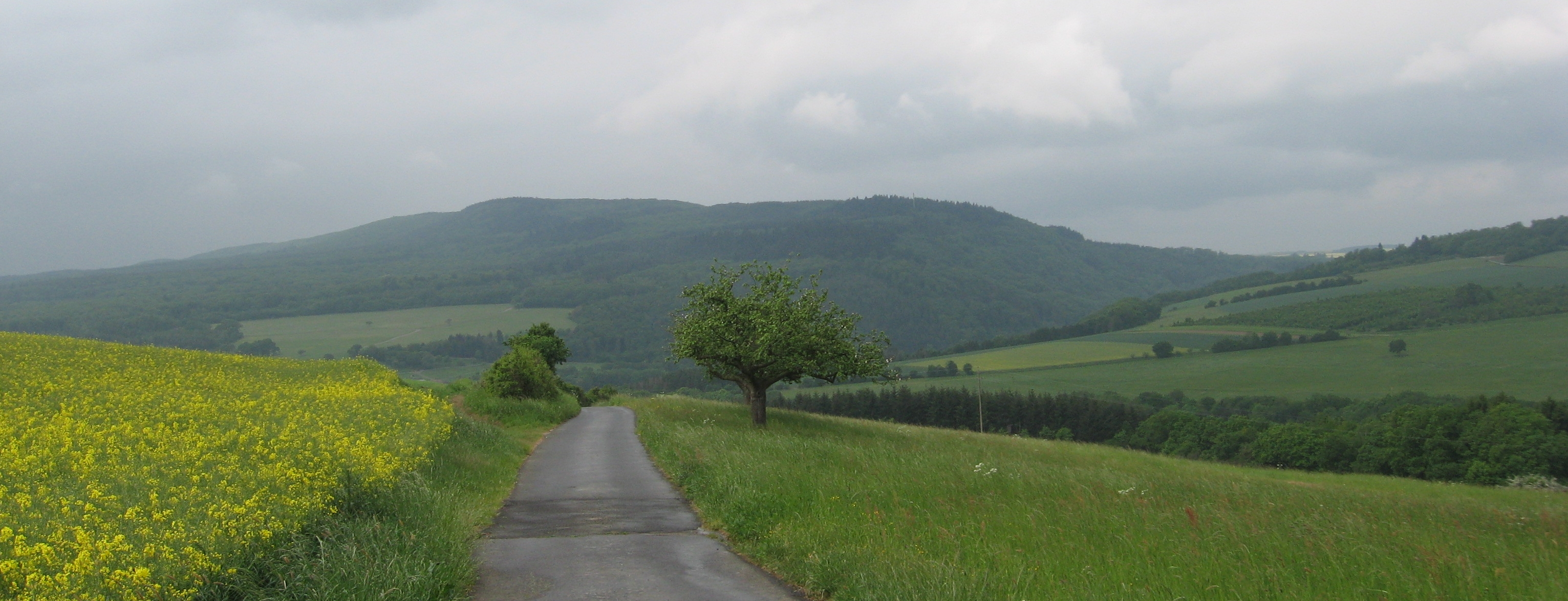
- The Lützelsoon from the south

Highest point
- Peak: Womrather Höhe
- Elevation: 599.1 m above NN

Dimensions
- Length: 7 km (4.3 mi)

Geography
- Location within Rhineland-Palatinate
- State(s): Bad Kreuznach, Rhineland-Palatinate, Germany
- Range coordinates: 49°51′14″N 7°26′57″E
- Parent range: Hunsrück

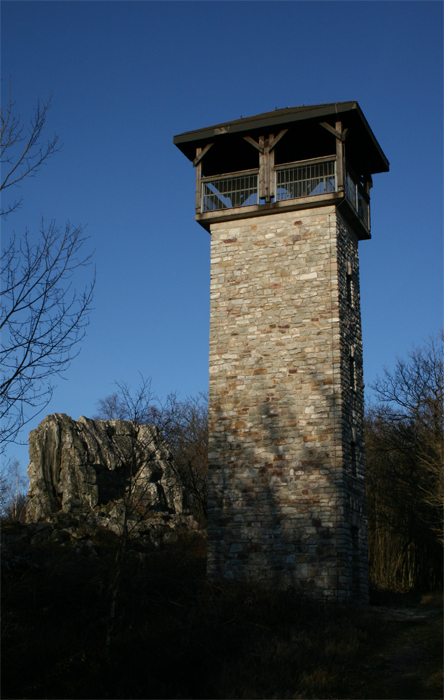
The Langer Heinrich observation tower on the Teufelsfels (left)

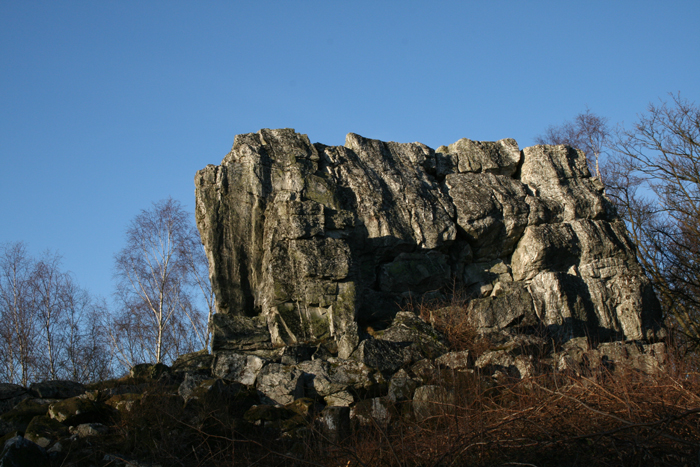
The Teufelsfels

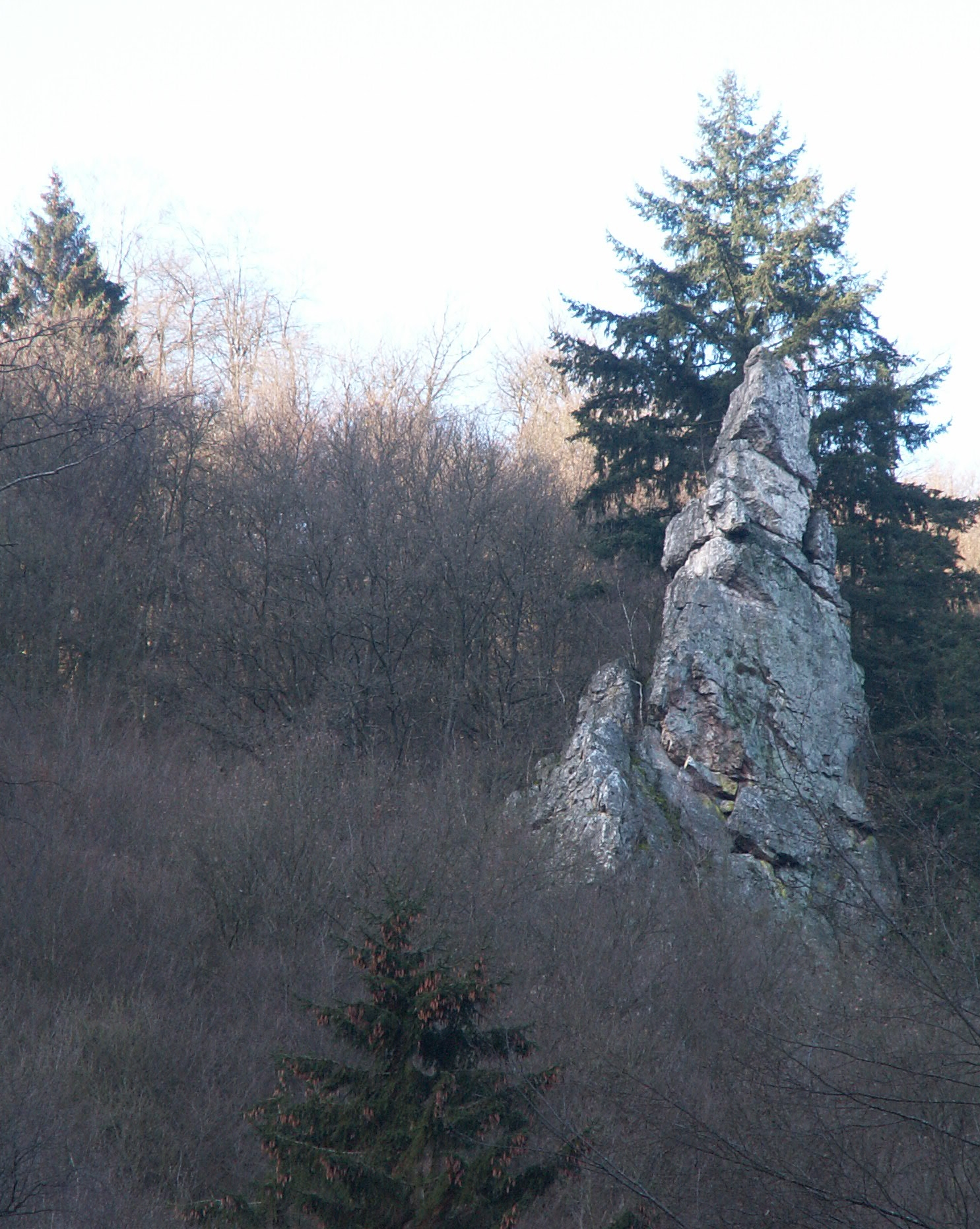
The Langenstein above the Kellenbach valley

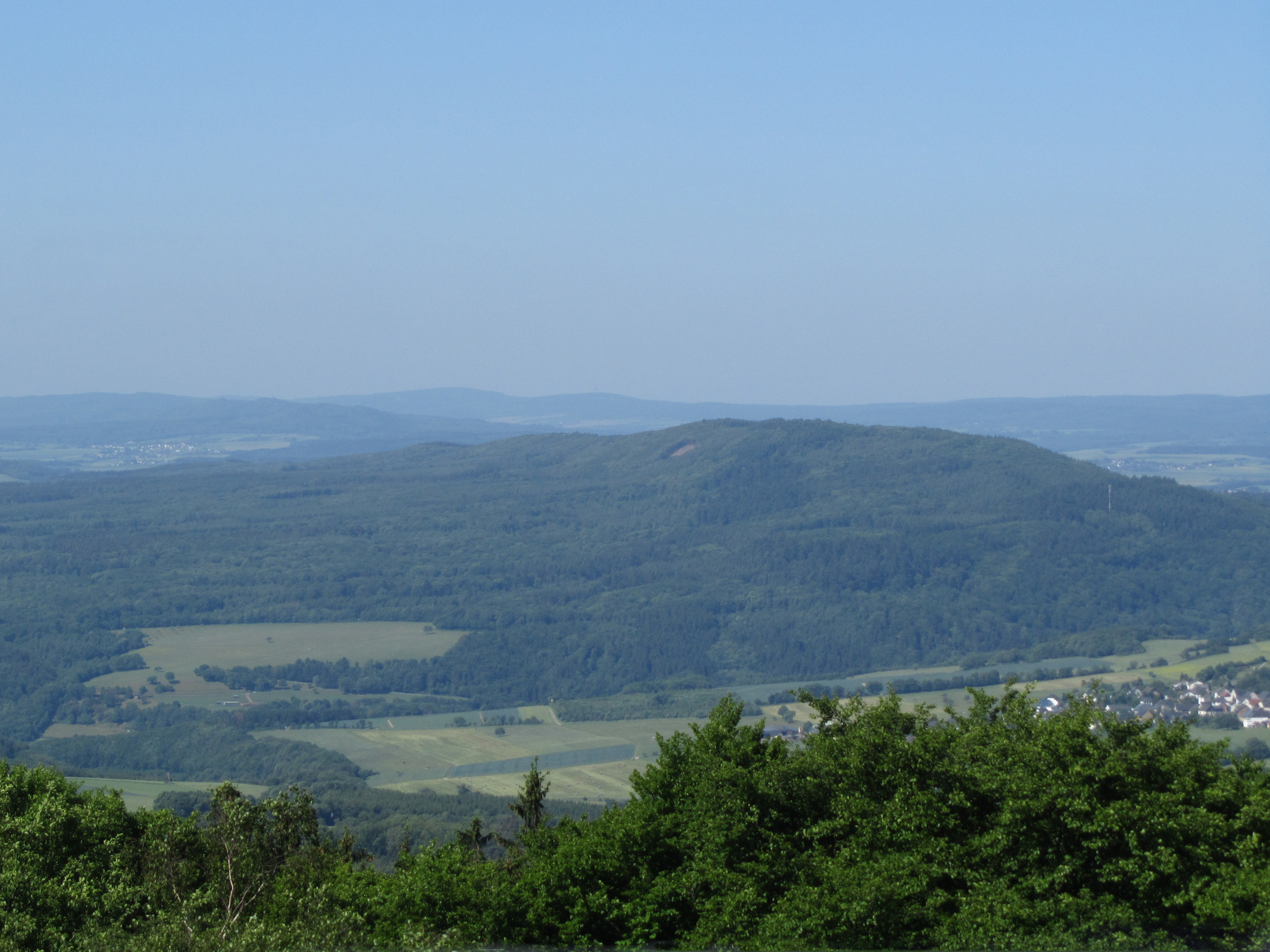
View of the Lützelsoon from the Alteburg

The Lützelsoon (also called the Kleiner Soon) is a part of the Hunsrück hills, 599.1 m above sea level (NN), in the county of Bad Kreuznach, in the state of Rhineland-Palatinate.

== Location ==
The Lützelsoon is a hill ridge southwest of the Soonwald range and north of Hennweiler between the Kellenbach valley (the lower course of the Simmerbach) to the east and northeast and the Hahnenbach valley to the west and southwest. Other plateaux of the Hunsrück border to the north and south. On its ridgeline are several large quartz formations like the Teufelsfels, the Blickensteine and the Katzensteine.

== Tourism ==
The Lützelsoon, which is covered by natural woodland and criss-crossed by paths, is not a particularly well known tourist area, yet offers trails especially suitable for hikers and cyclists, as well as those interested in castles, conservation or geology. Popular destinations are the viewing points of Blickenstein, Katzenstein and the Teufelsfels with its observation tower.

The slate so typical of the rooftops and decorations of houses in the region is responsible for the interesting quartzite rocks that "grew out of" the soft slate on the crest of the Soonwald over thousands of years. In the visitor mine of Herrenberg near Bundenbach guided tours are conducted through the pit. Ancient fossils may be seen at the fossil museum in Wartenstein Castle.

There are several castles and palaces in the vicinity of the Lützelsoon that are worth visiting: the ruins of the Schmidtburg, Wartenstein Castle, the Kyrburg in Kirn, Dhaun Castle, Gemünden Castle and the Celtic hillfort of Altburg.

The Soonwaldsteig trail runs through the Lützelsoon from west to east. At right angles to it is the Nahe–Moselle Celtic Way. The 30-kilometre-long Lützelsoon Cycleway runs through the western part of the range from Kirchberg to Kirn. Several routes that are part of the Hunsrück Slate and Castle Road (Hunsrück Schiefer- und Burgenstraße) run around the Lützelsoon.

== Teufelsfels ==
The Teufelsfels ("Devil Rock", 569.0 m), a natural monument, on the crest of the Lützelsoon, is the largest and most interesting of the four large quartzite buttes. It is situated between the villages of Schneppenbach, Bruschied and Hennweiler. Until the 1960s the rock could still be climbed using a fixed iron ladder. As a result of the weathering of the rock this was no longer possible from 1975, and the parish of Hennweiler contemplated the construction of an observation tower. The tower was finally built in 1984/85 on the initiative of the village chair, Heinrich Heimfahrt. As a result, the tower is also known locally as Langer Heinrich ("Long Henry"). The tower offers a unique 360 degree view over the Hunsrück, the thickly wooded heights of the Idar Forest, the Schwarzwälder Hochwald and the Soonwald as far as the Donnersberg in North Palatinate.

== Hills ==
The highest summit in the Lützelsoon is the Womrather Höhe at 599.1 m. The following is a list of hills, high points and rock formations – sorted by elevation in metres (m) above sea level (NN):

- Womrather Höhe (599.1 m), between Schneppenbach and Königsau, with the:
  - Teufelsfels (569.0 m), rocks (natural monument, NM), southwest of the Womrather Höhe; with observation tower
  - Blickenstein (near ca. 575 m), rocks (NM), east of the Womrather Höhe
  - Katzenstein (near the 555.2 metre spot height), rocks (NM), northeast of the Womrather Höhe
- Kochemeberg (502.3 m), near Bruschied, with:
  - Wehlenstein, rocks (NM), at the same place

== Villages ==
In and around the Lützelsoon lies several small, picturesque slate villages:

- Schlierschied – on the northern perimeter
- Woppenroth – on the northwestern perimeter
- Schneppenbach und Bruschied – on the western edge
- Kellenbach und Königsau – in the east
- Hennweiler und Hahnenbach – on the southwestern edge
- Heinzenberg – on the southeastern edge
- Oberhausen – on the southern edge

Other interesting villages in the vicinity are:

- Kirn (old Lederstadt)
- Idar-Oberstein (known as the gem town)
- Kirchberg

== Literature ==
- Uwe Anhäuser: Sagenhafter Hunsrück; Alf/Mosel: Rhein-Mosel-Verlag, 1995; ISBN 3-929745-23-2
- Uwe Anhäuser: Schinderhannes und seine Bande; Alf/Mosel: Rhein-Mosel-Verlag, 2003; ISBN 3-89801-014-7
