= Gemünden, Rhein-Hunsrück =

Gemünden
- Municipality
- Coat of arms

- Location of Gemünden within Rhein-Hunsrück-Kreis district
- Interactive map of Gemünden
- Location within Germany Location within Rhineland-Palatinate
- Coordinates: 49°53′40″N 7°28′39″E
- Country: Germany
- State: Rhineland-Palatinate
- District: Rhein-Hunsrück-Kreis
- Municipal assoc.: Kirchberg

Government
  - Mayor (2019–24): Agnes Chudy (CDU)

Area
  - Total: 10.66 km^{2} (4.12 sq mi)
- Elevation: 300 m (980 ft)

Population (2025-12-31)
  - Total: 1,296
  - Density: 121.6/km^{2} (314.9/sq mi)
- Time zone: UTC+01:00 (CET)
  - Summer (DST): UTC+02:00 (CEST)
- Postal codes: 55490
- Dialling codes: 06765
- Vehicle registration: SIM
- Website: www.gemuenden.de

Gemünden (German pronunciation: [ɡəˈmʏndn̩]) is an Ortsgemeinde – a municipality belonging to a Verbandsgemeinde, a kind of collective municipality) in the Rhein-Hunsrück-Kreis (district) in Rhineland-Palatinate, Germany. It belongs to the Verbandsgemeinde of Kirchberg, whose seat is in the town of-Kirchberg.

== Geography ==
=== Location ===
The municipality lies at the southwest edge of the Soonwald, a heavily wooded section of the west-central Hunsrück. The village is found between Kirchberg to the northwest and Simmertal to the southeast. In Gemünden, the Lametbach empties into the Simmerbach, whereupon the combined stream is known down to its mouth into the river Nahe as the Kellenbach.

=== Constituent communities ===
The outlying centre of Panzweiler is part of Gemünden.

== History ==
In 1304, Gemünden had its first documentary mention. This holding of the Counts of Sponheim was granted town rights along with its trappings, namely fortifications, a court and a market. Beginning in 1794, Gemünden lay under French rule. In 1815 it was assigned to the Kingdom of Prussia at the Congress of Vienna. Since 1946, it has been part of the then newly founded state of Rhineland-Palatinate.

== Politics ==
=== Municipal council ===
The council is made up of 16 council members, who were elected by proportional representation at the municipal election held on 7 June 2009, and the honorary mayor as chairman.

The municipal election held on 7 June 2009 yielded the following results:

	SPD	CDU	FWG Gemünden	WG Jung	other voter groups	Total
2009	3	4	5	4	–	16 seats
2004	4	6	–	–	6	16 seats

=== Mayor ===
Gemünden’s mayor is Agnes Chudy.

=== Coat of arms ===
The German blazon reads: Schild geteilt, oben blau/gold geschacht, unten in Rot eine silberne Gewandschließe.

The municipality’s arms might in English heraldic language be described thus: Per pale chequy of eight azure and Or and gules an arming buckle argent.

The “chequy” pattern above the line of partition refers to the village’s former allegiance to the “Further” County of Sponheim. The lower half of the escutcheon is a reference to the Schmidtburg.

== Culture and sightseeing ==
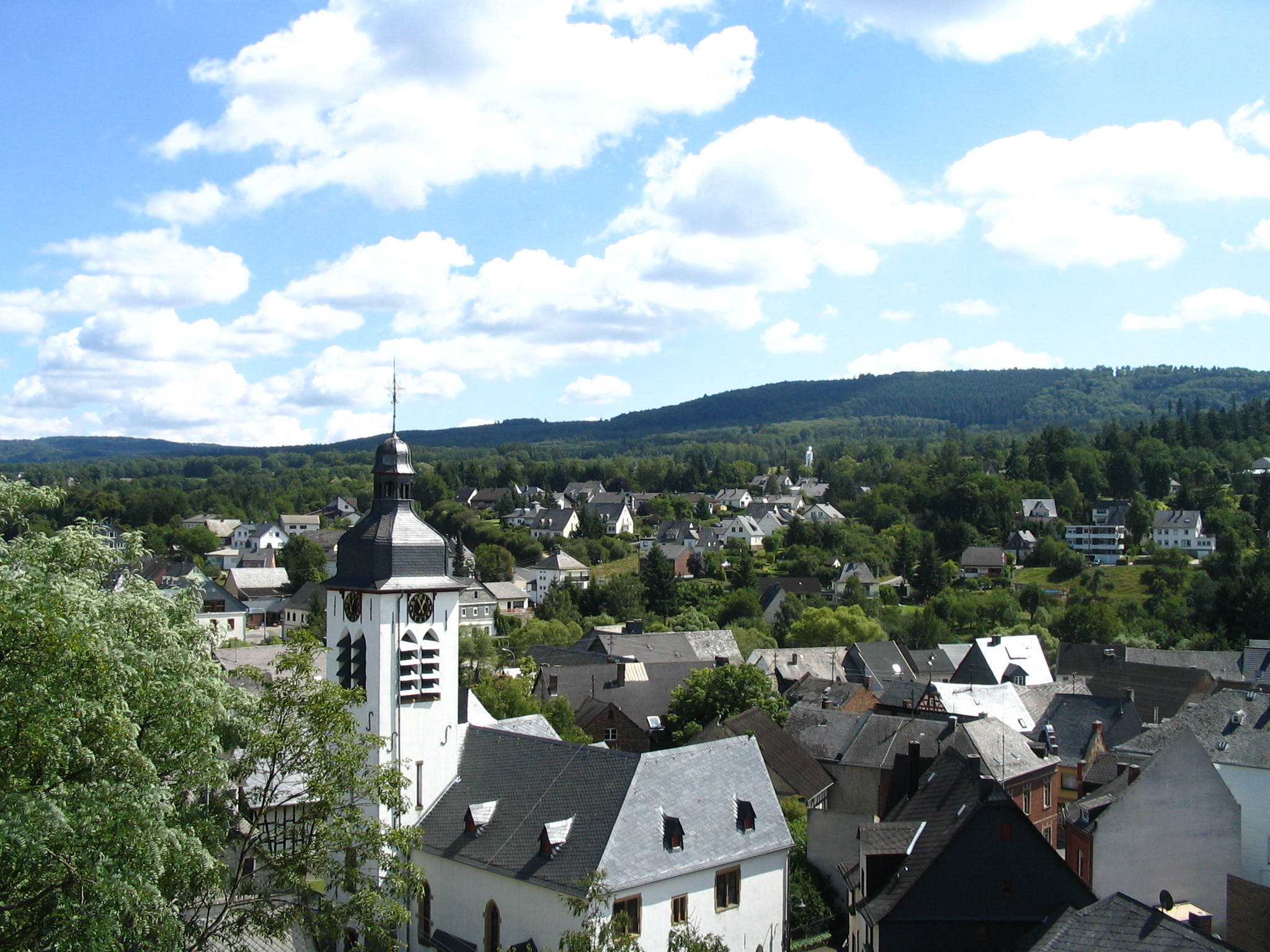
Schloßstraße: Evangelical church

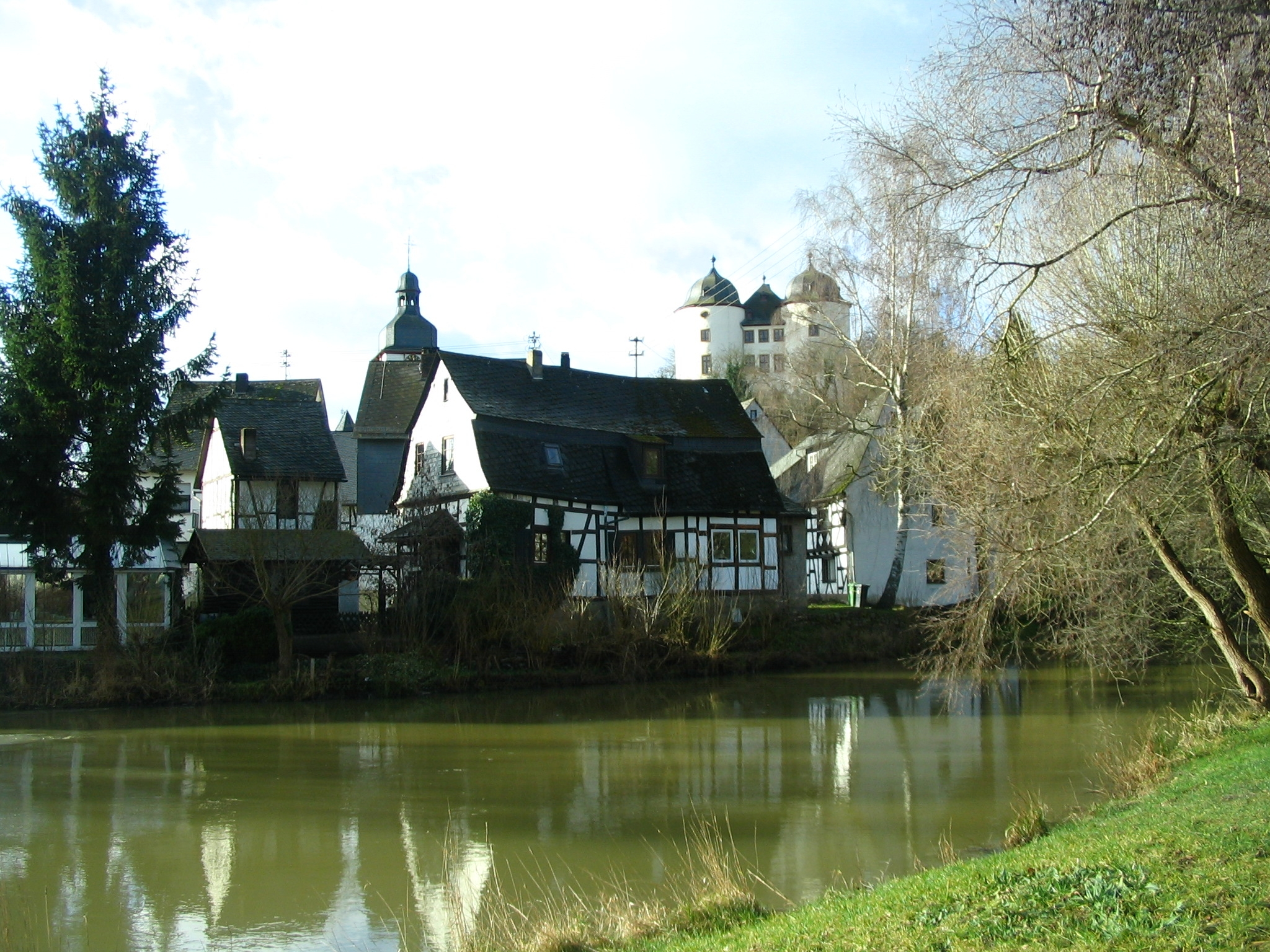
Simmerbach and Schloss Gemünden

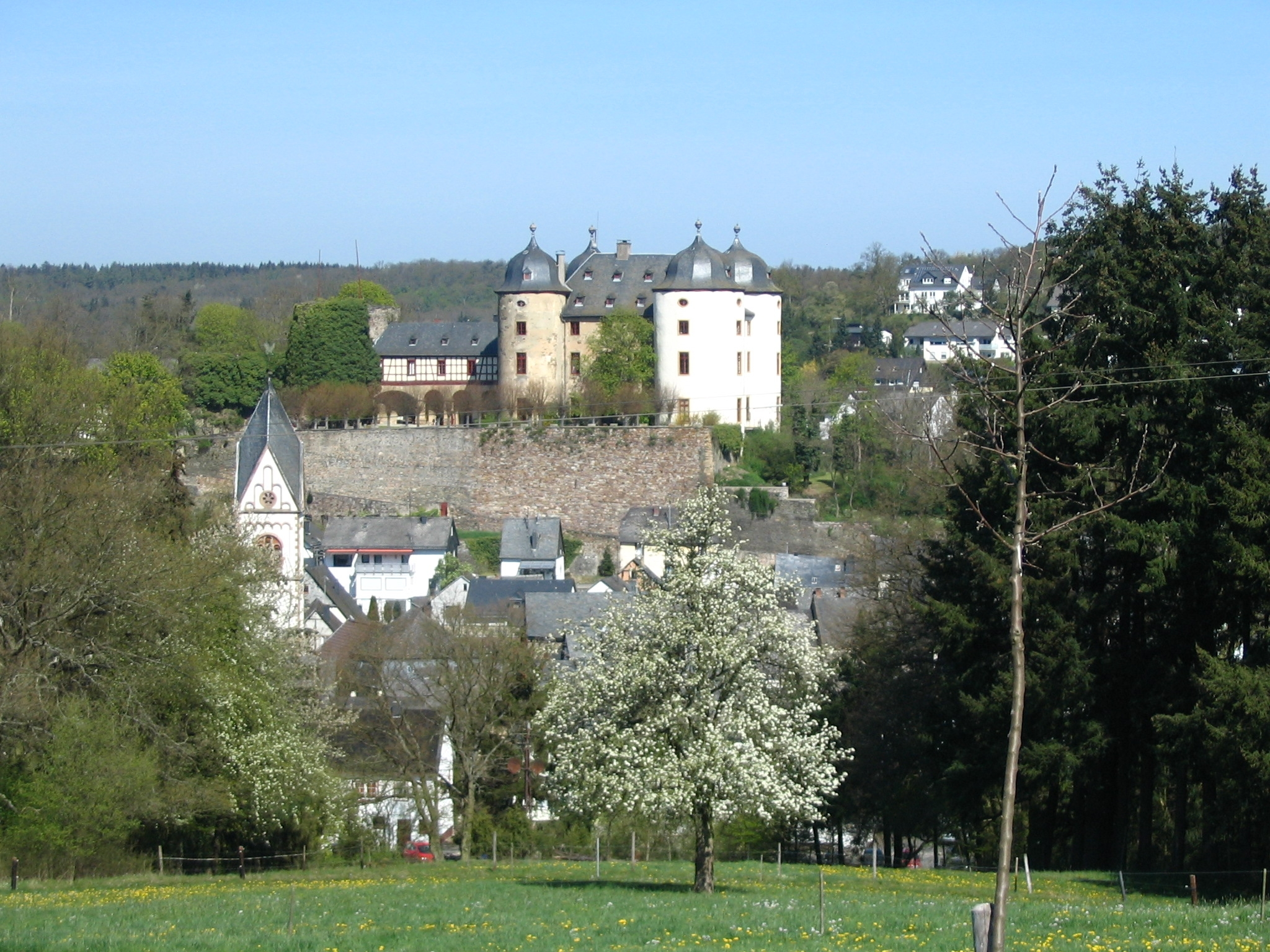
Schloßstraße 20: Schloss Gemünden

For its historic village centre and its valley location, locals call Gemünden the “Pearl of the Hunsrück” (Perle des Hunsrücks). Standing above the Simmerbach is Schloss Gemünden, a residential castle still used as a private home today. A good two kilometres south of Gemünden stands the Castle Koppenstein ruin on the Koppensteiner Höhe, a 555 m-high hilltop in the Soonwald. Five kilometres to the east is the Alteburgturm, a lookout tower on the Alteburg (mountain). Southwest of Gemünden is the Lützelsoon plateau.

=== Buildings ===
The following are listed buildings or sites in Rhineland-Palatinate’s Directory of Cultural Monuments:

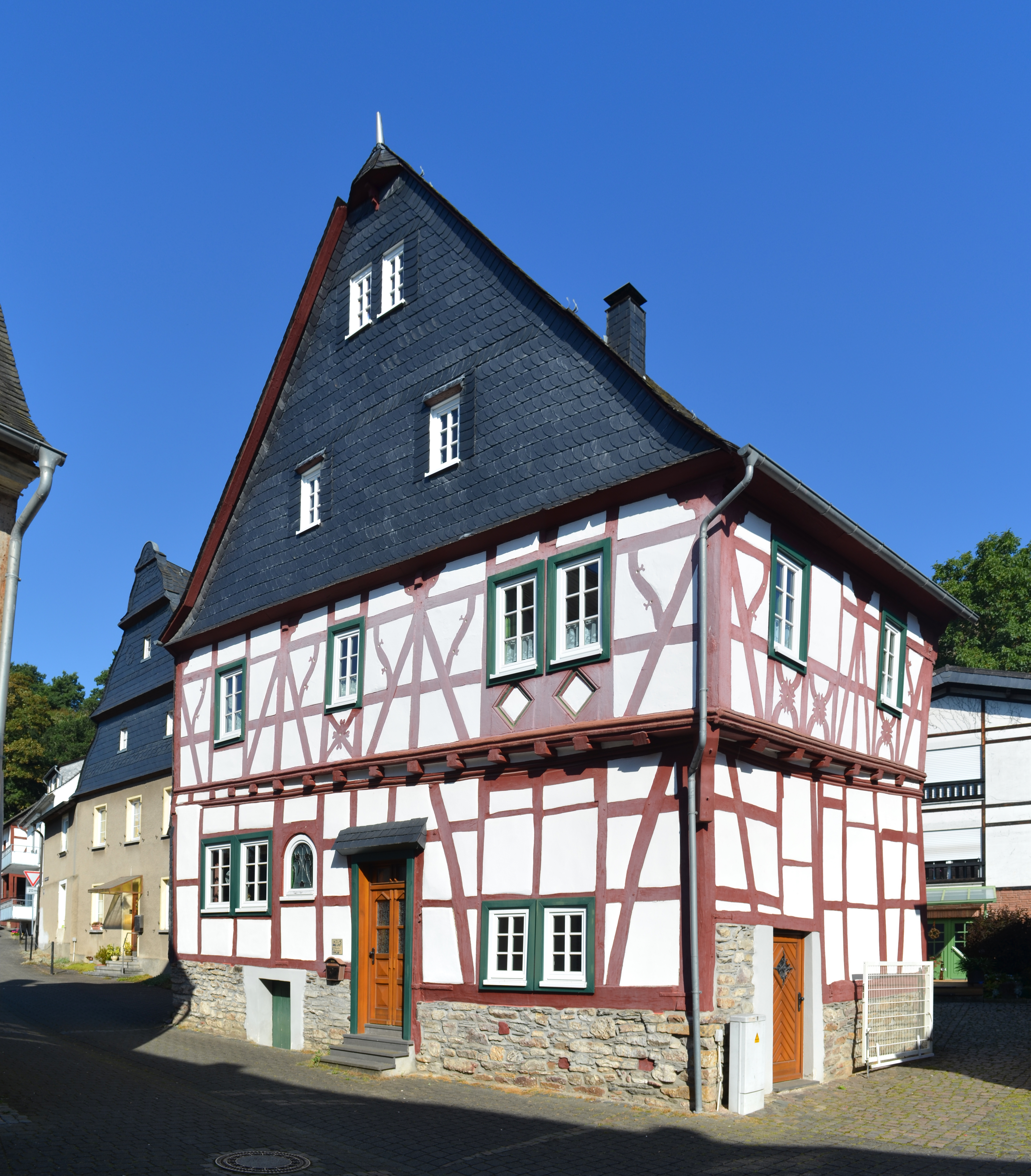
Kirchberger Straße 5

- Evangelical church, Schloßstraße – tower’s lower floors Late Romanesque, earlier half of the 13th century; Late Gothic quire, about 1450; nave and – tower’s upper floors 1905/1906; Classicist monument, after 1822
- Saint Peter’s and Saint Paul’s Catholic Parish Church (Pfarrkirche St. Peter und Paul), Hauptstraße – two-naved hall church, mixed Romanesque Revival and Gothic Revival forms, 1899, architect Lambert von Fisenne, Gelsenkirchen, tower 1900/1901
- Schloss Gemünden, Schloßstraße 20 – older castle house, about 1300 (?), partly in ruins, arcade gallery “new building” mentioned about 1417, extensively restored in 1520, rectangular building with corner towers, after 1689 destruction rebuilt as three-floor building, 1718-1728, Electoral-Trier Court master builder Hans Georg Judas; commercial estate, early 18th century; whole complex of buildings with the Schlossberg (mountain)
- Auf der Hohl – electrical substation tower; three-floor quarrystone building, marked 1927
- Burgweg 1 – one-floor plastered villa, about 1930
- Hauptstraße 13 – timber-frame building house, partly solid, half-hipped roof, about 1700
- Hauptstraße 19/21 – Forellenhof (“Trout Estate”); timber-frame house, partly solid, earlier half of the 18th century
- Hauptstraße 54 – timber-frame house, partly solid, about 1700
- Kaisergrube (monumental zone) – slate mine, in terraces and galleries; site protected by law against digging (Grabungsschutzgebiet)
- Kirchberger Straße 3 – timber-frame house, plastered, partly slated, marked 1721
- Kirchberger Straße 4 – narrow timber-frame house, about 1700, timber-frame addition from the 19th century
- Kirchberger Straße 5 – former inn; timber-frame house, partly solid, half-hipped roof, late 17th or early 18th century
- Kirchberger Straße 7 – timber-frame house, partly solid, about 1700
- Kirchberger Straße 12 – timber-frame house, partly solid, first third of the 18th century
- Kirchberger Straße 13 – timber-frame house, partly solid, hipped mansard roof, marked 1721
- Kirchberger Straße 15 – timber-frame house, partly solid, plastered, 17th century
- At Kirchberger Straße 17/19 – wooden smithy coat of arms
- Kirchberger Straße 23 – town hall; timber-frame house, partly solid, apparently from 1692/1694, more likely from earlier half of the 18th century
- Kirchberger Straße 25 – timber-frame house, partly solid, plastered, essentially from the 17th century
- Kirchberger Straße 31 – timber-frame house, partly solid, plastered, gatehouse, 18th century; Schüler tomb slab, about 1753
- Raiffeisenstraße 6/8 – former school; quarrystone building, mid 19th century, expansion in the latter half of the 19th century
- Schloßstraße 4/6 – former Badish tollhouse; double house, timber-frame bungalow, mansard roof, marked 1719
- Jewish graveyard (monumental zone) – possibly opened in 1815/1820, 92 grave steles beginning from 1814; 14 gravestones from the early 19th century, last burial in 1970

=== Regular events ===
By longstanding tradition, the kermis is held on the last weekend in July and the fire brigade festival on the last weekend in August.

== Economy and infrastructure ==
=== Tourism ===
A 4 km-long geological teaching path begins and ends in Gemünden. Twenty-three mineral groups from the Hunsrück-Nahe region are shown and explained on display boards. On the way, the path comes into contact with the Kaisergrube, the mine opened in 1873, where until 1969 slate was mined. Slate mining began in Gemünden in the early 19th century. On average, 600 t of slate was mined each year, and up to 35 miners were employed.

Gemünden is the starting point of the Schinderhannes-Soonwald-Radweg (cycle path) to Simmern.

== Famous people ==
- Louis Wirth (1897-1952), American sociologist (Chicago school) of German-Jewish heritage
- Joseph Grohé (1902-1987), Nazi Gauleiter and Reichskommissar of the Reichskommissariat of Belgium and Northern France
