= Schmidtburg =

Coordinates: 49°50′46″N 7°23′27″E

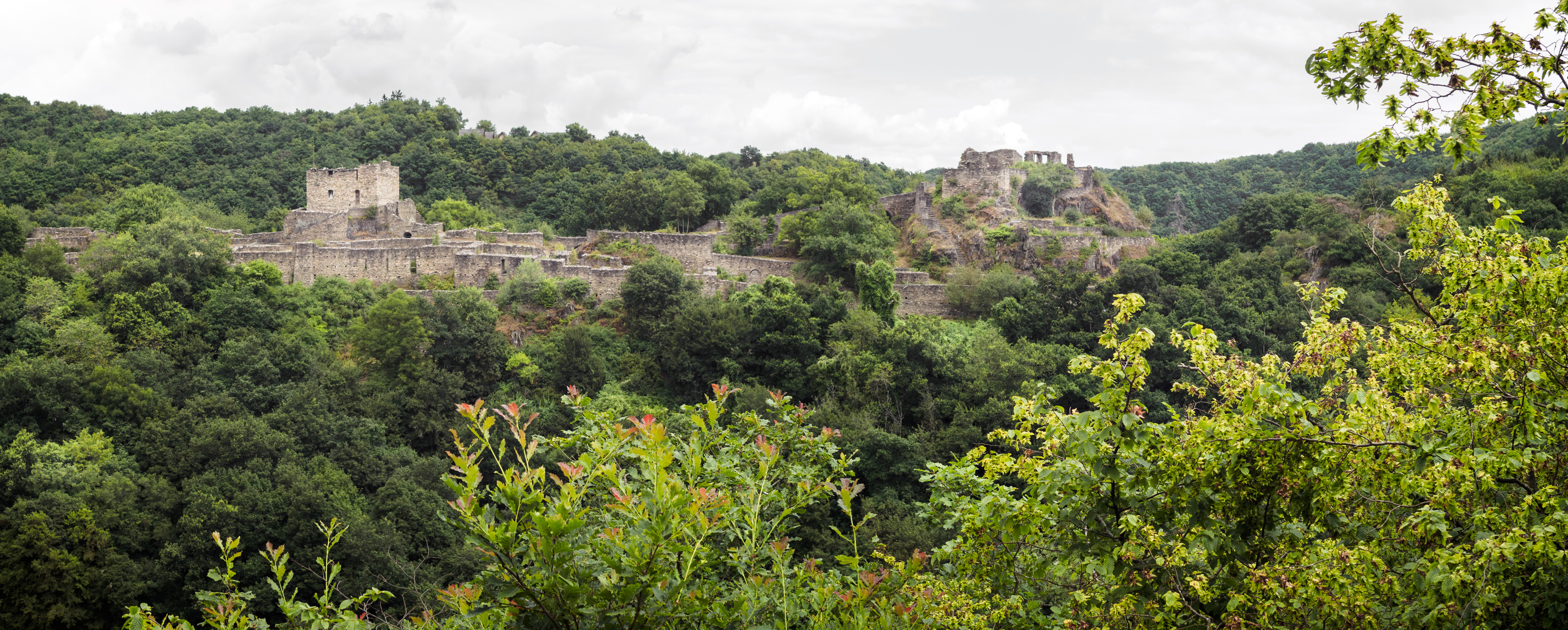
Schmidtburg

The Schmidtburg is a ruined hill castle next to Schneppenbach (Hunsrück) in Germany. The castle was built up in 926, and was destroyed during the War of the Grand Alliance (1688–1697) by French troops in 1688.

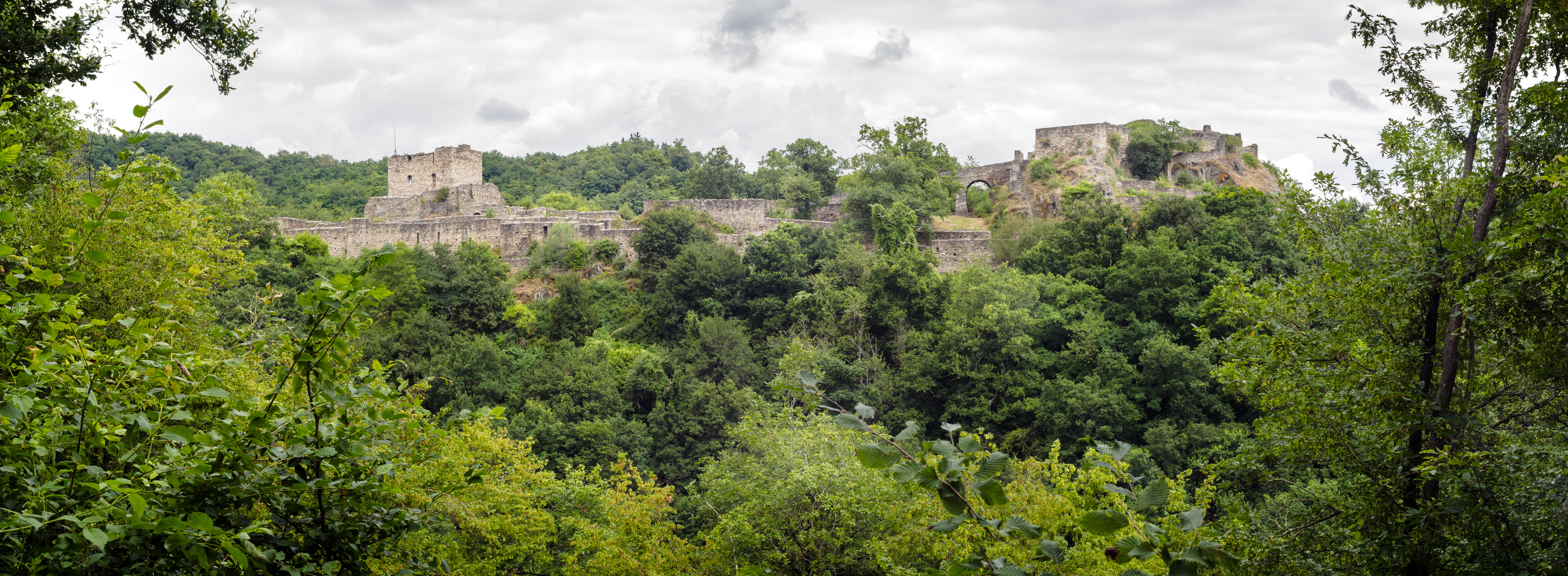
Schmidtburg castle

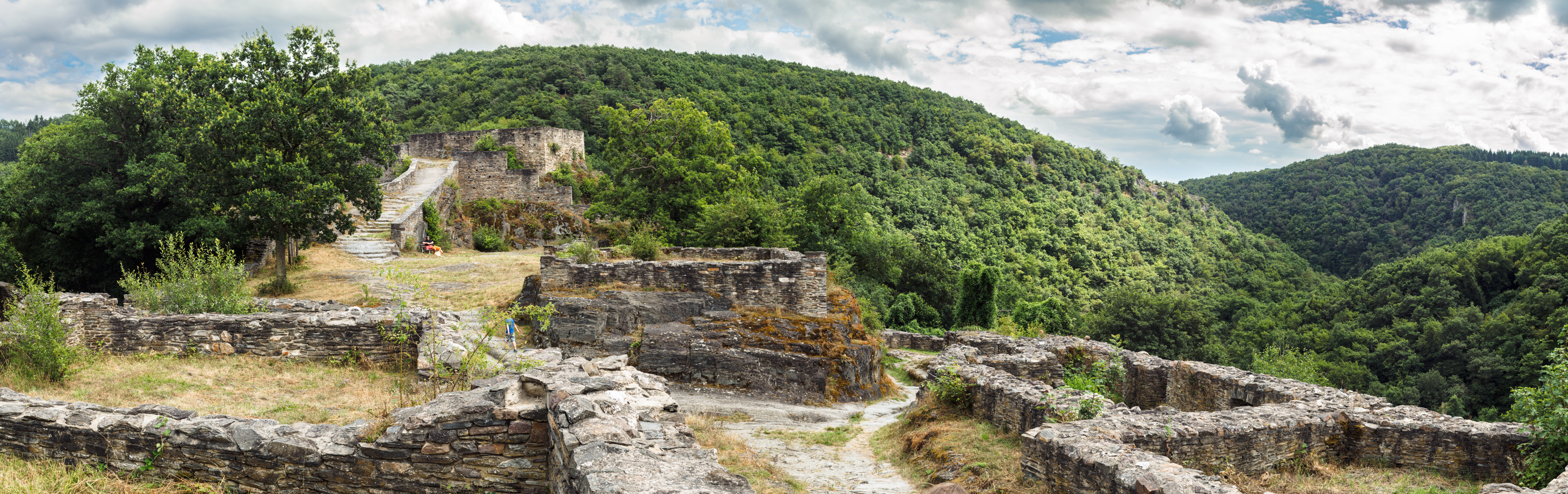
Schmidtburg castle – view from lower tower

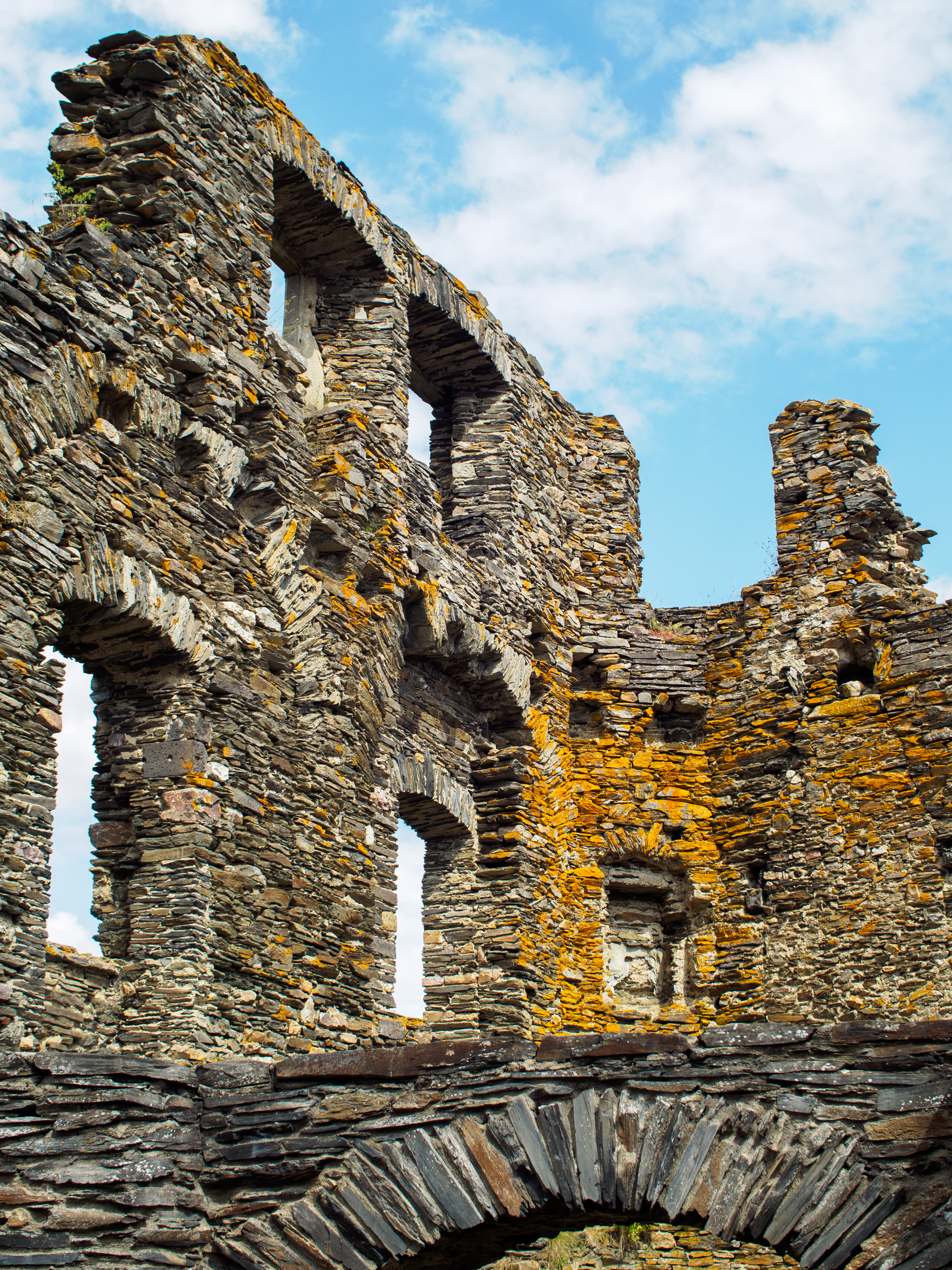
Schmidtburg castle – detail of upper tower

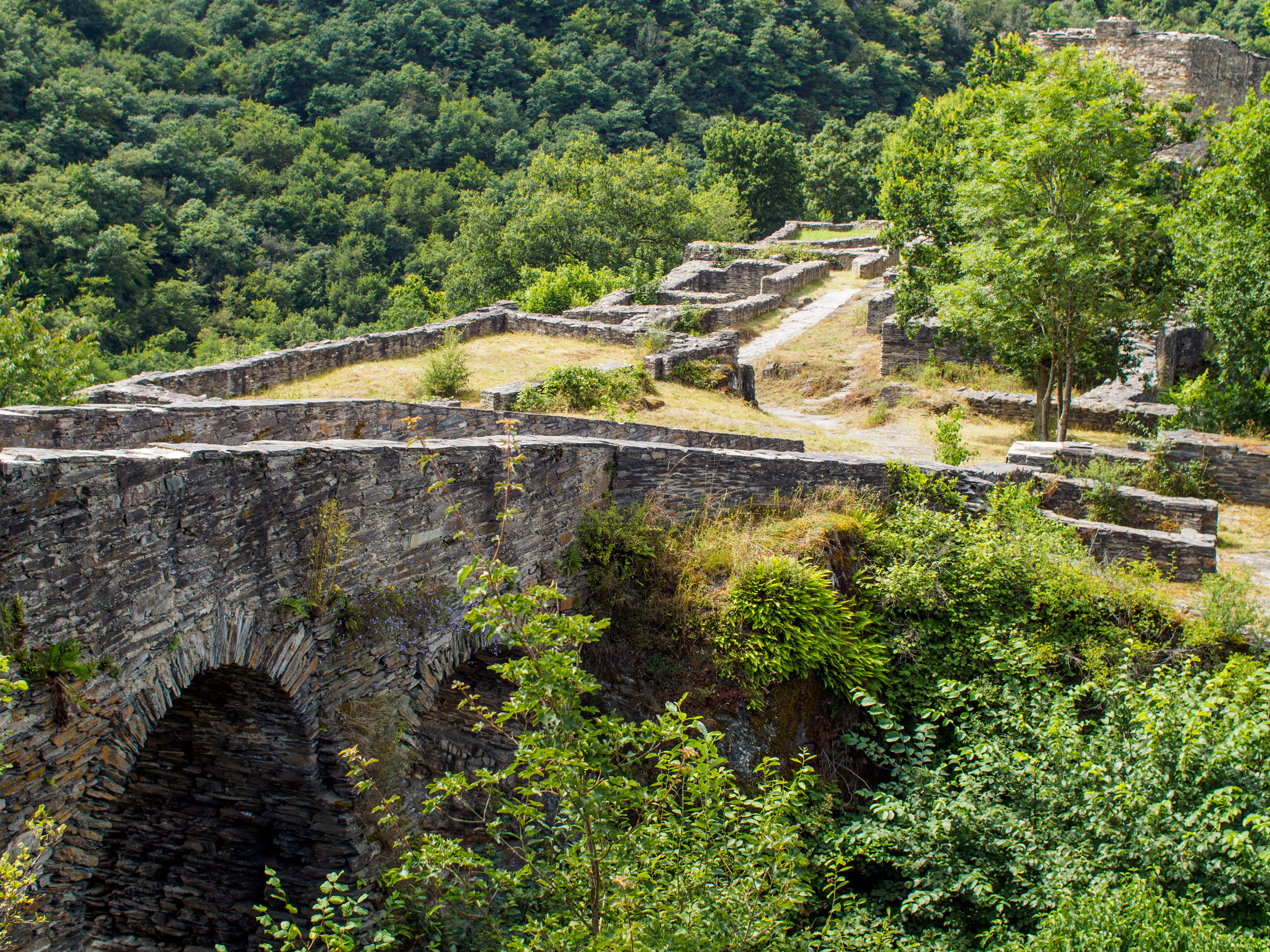
Schmidtburg castle – view from upper tower

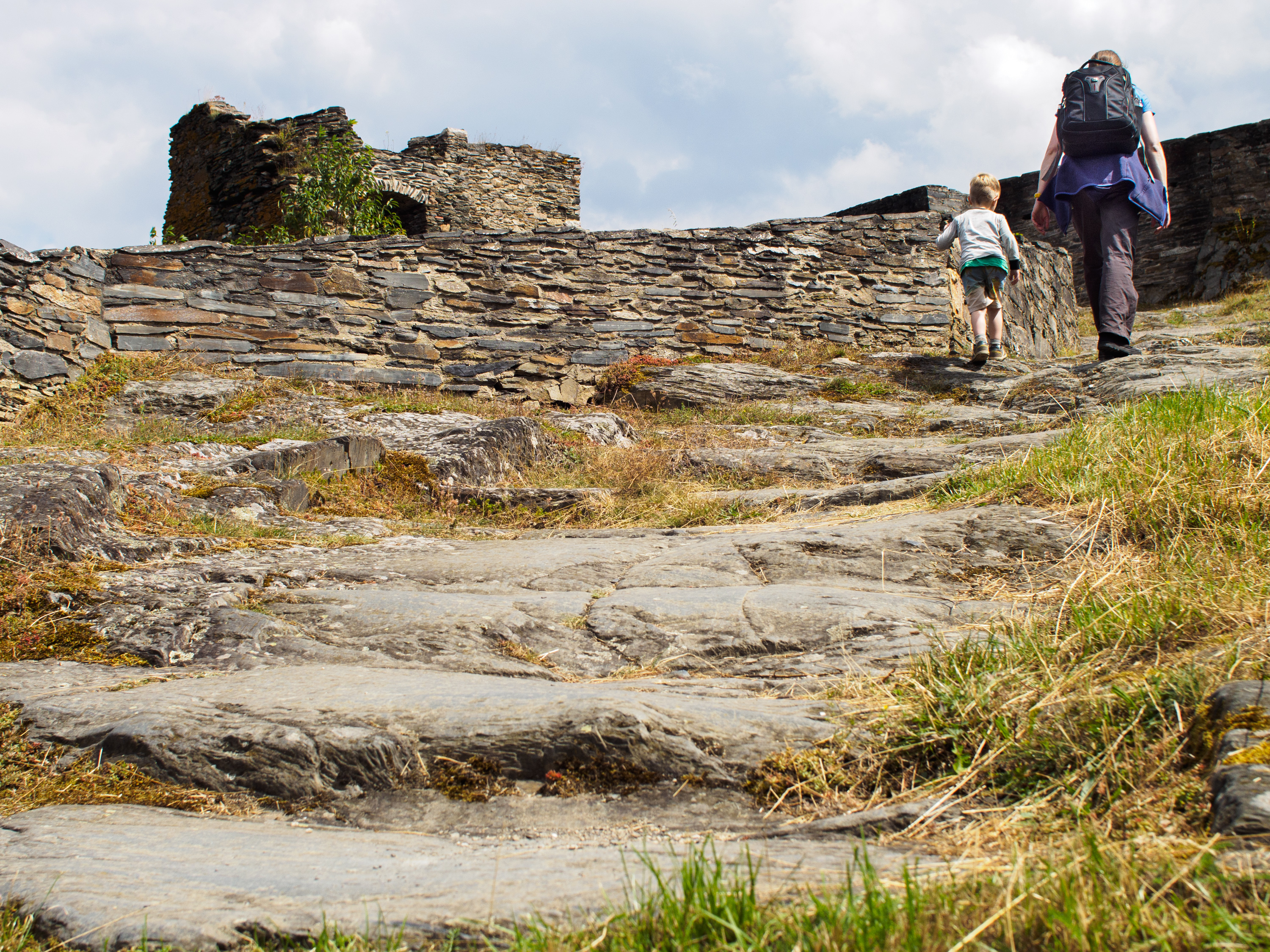
Schmidtburg castle – hewn steps towards upper tower
