= Horbach, Bad Kreuznach =

Horbach
- Municipality
- Coat of arms

- Location of Horbach within Bad Kreuznach district
- Interactive map of Horbach
- Location within Germany Location within Rhineland-Palatinate
- Coordinates: 49°49′21″N 7°30′48″E
- Country: Germany
- State: Rhineland-Palatinate
- District: Bad Kreuznach
- Municipal assoc.: Kirner Land

Government
  - Mayor (2019–24): Günter Buhrmann-Klein

Area
  - Total: 1.92 km^{2} (0.74 sq mi)
- Elevation: 360 m (1,180 ft)

Population (2025-12-31)
  - Total: 41
  - Density: 21/km^{2} (55/sq mi)
- Time zone: UTC+01:00 (CET)
  - Summer (DST): UTC+02:00 (CEST)
- Postal codes: 55606
- Dialling codes: 06754
- Vehicle registration: KH
- Website: www.kirn-land.de

Horbach (German pronunciation: [ˈhɔʁbax]) is an Ortsgemeinde – a municipality belonging to a Verbandsgemeinde, a kind of collective municipality – in the Bad Kreuznach district in Rhineland-Palatinate, Germany. It belongs to the Verbandsgemeinde Kirner Land, whose seat is in the town of Kirn. Horbach is a state-recognized tourism community, and also the district's second smallest municipality by population, after Heinzenberg.

== Geography ==
=== Location ===
Horbach lies in the southern Hunsrück at an elevation of 340 m above sea level on the western foothills of the Soonwald above the Kellenbach and the municipality of Simmertal. Found well away from the main through roads, Horbach lies across the Kellenbach valley from Schloss Dhaun, and unlike so many other municipalities in Kirn-Land, it has kept a certain agrarian character from bygone days in the village's appearance.

=== Neighbouring municipalities ===
Clockwise from the north, Horbach's neighbours are the municipalities of Simmertal and Brauweiler, both of which likewise lie within the Bad Kreuznach district.

== History ==
Horbach's name was attested in 1541 as Horbruch, which means “boggy land”. Originally, Horbach, Brauweiler, Martinstein and Simmern unter Dhaun (since 1971 called Simmertal) formed a Markgenossenschaft, an association with combined economic and legal functions. All land, whether built upon or not, was a unit. Ecclesiastically and administratively, Simmern unter Dhaun was the hub of this great municipal area, while the neighbouring villages were either outgrowth or daughter settlements of this mother village. It can also be assumed that the neighbouring villages’ foundings came about with the arrival of settlers from a village in the original municipal area, as otherwise there would be no way to explain everybody's rights to common land and joint ownership of grazing land, water and woodland. Only in 1513 was Horbach's municipal area split off from this greater body with the setting of 18 boundary stones. The lordship over the village of Horbach in the Middle Ages was shared among several lords, among whom were the Counts of Sponheim and the Waldgraves. In 1340, it is known that Horbach was granted Electoral Mainz rights, which later, in 1393, were bestowed upon the Knights of Löwenstein. In the time that followed, Horbach became part of the Imperial Knightly Lordship of Martinstein and counted the Barons of Ebersberg, called of Weyers-Leyen, among others, as its local lords. In 1747, the Evangelical church was built, at which the pastor from Simmern unter Dhaun provided church services. In the 18th century, the village lordship passed to the Margrave of Baden, who had the Lordship of Martinstein administered by an Amtmann who was resident at Castle Naumburg (near Bärenbach). Horbach and Martinstein each had a Schultheiß. In the course of administrative restructuring undertaken by the Revolutionary/Napoleonic French, Horbach was grouped about 1800 into the Mairie (“Mayoralty”) of Monzingen. The village remained in the later Bürgermeisterei (“Mayoralty”) or Amt of Monzingen until it was assigned to the Verbandsgemeinde of Kirn-Land in 1970.

== Religion ==
As at 30 September 2013, there are 43 full-time residents in Horbach, and of those, 34 are Evangelical (79.07%), 4 are Catholic (9.302%) and 5 (11.628%) either have no religion or will not reveal their religious affiliation.

== Politics ==
=== Municipal council ===
The council is made up of 6 council members, who were elected by majority vote at the municipal election held on 7 June 2009, and the honorary mayor as chairman.

=== Mayor ===
Horbach's mayor is Günter Buhrmann-Klein.

=== Coat of arms ===
The German blazon reads: Schild gespalten durch eine eingeschweifte, erniedrigte, blaue Spitze, darin ein silberner Pfahl. Vorn ein blaubewehrter und -gezungter roter Löwe in Gold, hinten fünf silberne (2:1:2) Kugeln in Schwarz.

The municipality's arms might in English heraldic language be described thus: Per pall reversed embowed to base in the flanks, dexter Or a lion rampant sinister gules armed and langued azure, sinister sable five roundles argent, two, one and two, and in base azure a pale of the fifth.

The charge on the dexter (armsbearer's right, viewer's left) side, the lion, is a reference to the village's former allegiance to the Waldgraviate-Rhinegraviate. The quincunx charge on the sinister (armsbearer's left, viewer's right) side is drawn from the arms once borne by the Lords of Sickingen. The composition appearing in base is drawn from the arms once borne by the House of Leyen. The coat of arms was modelled after an old border stone that can still be found in Horbach's outlying countryside today. Municipal council, on 6 April 1976, gave the graphic artist Brust from Kirn-Sulzbach the task of designing a municipal coat of arms. At a council meeting on 13 August 1978, council adopted the design that had been put forth. After consent by the state archive, the Ministry of the Interior in Mainz granted approval for Hahnenbach to bear its own arms on 7 February 1979. The municipal banner also bears this coat of arms in the centre.

== Culture and sightseeing ==
=== Buildings ===
The following are listed buildings or sites in Rhineland-Palatinate’s Directory of Cultural Monuments:

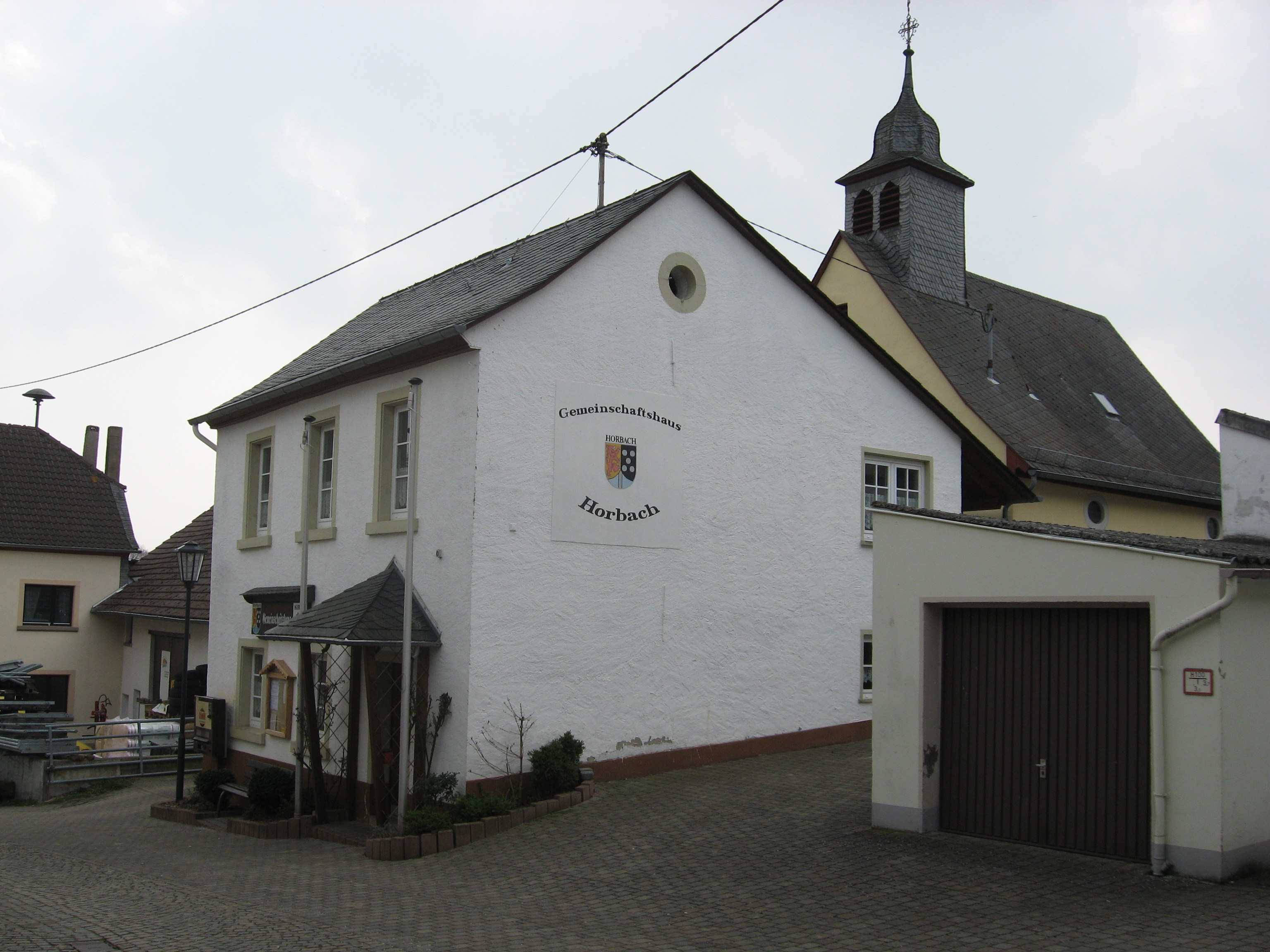
Dorfstraße 3 – Evangelical church (in the background)

- Evangelical church, Dorfstraße 3 – Baroque aisleless church, marked 1747

=== Clubs ===
Since it is a very small place, Horbach does not have much of a club life, but it does have its Förderverein der freiwilligen Feuerwehr Horbach, the volunteer fire brigade promotional association.

== Economy and infrastructure ==
=== Transport ===
Horbach lies up at the end of Kreisstraße 13, which leads down to Landesstraße 230 in the Apfelbach valley, which itself leads down to Bundesstraße 421 at Simmertal, making for a rather circuitous link to the national highway network. Serving nearby Martinstein and Hochstetten-Dhaun are railway stations on the Nahe Valley Railway (Bingen–Saarbrücken).
