= Merxheim =

- Municipality
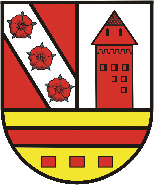
- Coat of arms

- Location of Merxheim within Bad Kreuznach district
- Interactive map of Merxheim
- Location within Germany Location within Rhineland-Palatinate
- Coordinates: 49°47′40″N 7°33′44″E
- Country: Germany
- State: Rhineland-Palatinate
- District: Bad Kreuznach
- Municipal assoc.: Nahe-Glan

Government
  - Mayor (2019–24): Egon Eckhardt (SPD)

Area
  - Total: 17.05 km^{2} (6.58 sq mi)
- Elevation: 172 m (564 ft)

Population (2025-12-31)
  - Total: 1,415
  - Density: 82.99/km^{2} (214.9/sq mi)
- Time zone: UTC+01:00 (CET)
  - Summer (DST): UTC+02:00 (CEST)
- Postal codes: 55627
- Dialling codes: 06754
- Vehicle registration: KH
- Website: www.merxheim.de

Merxheim is a small town and Ortsgemeinde in the Bad Kreuznach district in Rhineland-Palatinate, western Germany. It belongs to the Verbandsgemeinde Nahe-Glan. The town's economy is traditionally based on wine making. The town is partnered with Merxheim, Haut-Rhin in France. The town is located around 100 km. east of the city of Luxembourg and around 90 km southwest of Frankfurt. Merxheim is located on the border of Moselle Franconian dialects and Hessian dialects.

== Geography ==
=== Location ===
Merxheim lies on the south bank of the Nahe between the gemstone town of Idar-Oberstein and the spa town and district seat of Bad Kreuznach.

=== Neighbouring municipalities ===
Clockwise from the north, Merxheim's neighbours are the municipalities of Martinstein, Weiler bei Monzingen, Monzingen, Meddersheim, Kirschroth, Limbach, Heimweiler, Meckenbach, Hochstetten-Dhaun and Simmertal, all of which likewise lie within the Bad Kreuznach district.

=== Constituent communities ===
Also belonging to Merxheim are the outlying homesteads of Gänsmühle, Kornsmühle and Weinelsmühle. German Wikipedia also lists former names for Kornsmühle (Eltgesmühle or Iltismühle) and Weinelsmühle (Franzenmühle), along with yet another outlying homestead that is not listed by the State Office for Statistics, namely Estrella, along with a former name for it (Kauzenmühle).

== History ==
In the oldest document thus far found that deals with Merxheim, from 1061, Archbishop of Trier Eberhard donated the estate of Merkedesheim to Saint Simeon's Foundation in Trier. In the confirmation document from Archbishop Adalbert of Mainz (d. 1137), the name Merxheim appears for the first time. In 1350, a knight, Sir Conrad of Merxheim was mentioned. His two children, Rorich and Adelheid, shared between themselves their father's allodial holdings (lands held in fief) in Merxheim. After Rorich's death, Hunolstein and Hohenburg each took a share in the "Schloss" and village. Thus, a one-half share of Merxheim passed as an allodial and Imperially immediate holding to the House of the Vögte of Hunolstein, while the other one-half share passed to Weyrich of Hohenburg. In the War of the Succession of Landshut (1504-1505), the army of Duke Alexander of Zweibrücken plundered the village. In 1504, Merxheim was burnt to the ground. The outbreak of the Plague that struck in September 1612 claimed 228 lives over only four months. The French Revolution ended the lordships that had held sway over Merxheim. The Schloss was acquired by the Catholic Church and thereafter served as a House of God. From 1798 to 1814, Merxheim was French and found itself grouped into the Canton of Meisenheim, the Arrondissement of Birkenfeld and the Department of Sarre. After Revolutionary and Napoleonic French rule, Merxheim passed in 1815 under the terms of the Congress of Vienna to the Kingdom of Prussia, only to pass the very next year to the Landgraviate of Hesse-Homburg, under whose sovereignty it remained until the Austro-Prussian War in 1866, when the Kingdom of Prussia, having achieved hegemony over a great many German states in this war, annexed, among other places, Merxheim and assigned it to its new Rhine Province and, within this, to the Meisenheim district. Five years later, Merxheim found itself in the German Empire, but it remained in Prussia, one of Imperial, Weimar and Nazi Germany's constituent states, until 1945, when Prussia as a distinct entity passed into history with its dissolution under Allied occupation. Other catastrophes also marked Merxheim's history, such as the 1778 and 1788 cloudbursts, whose attendant mudslides destroyed houses. The greatest catastrophe that ever befell the village is still the one that happened on 24 July 1870. Some children playing in a barn managed to start a fire that led to such a great blaze that within three hours, 107 houses and their associated commercial buildings went up in flames. The old "Nürnberger Turm", a tower that for centuries had been held to be Merxheim's defining landmark, was thoroughly gutted and was later torn down. The Evangelical church, too, was swallowed up in the great fire, although a new one was built within a few years on the same spot. In 1935, there was a further shift in the local administrative structure. The Amt of Meddersheim was placed under the same administration as the Amt of Sobernheim – a kind of "personal union" – and then in 1940 it was finally merged into that Amt. In the course of administrative restructuring in Rhineland-Palatinate, Merxheim was grouped into the Verbandsgemeinde of Bad Sobernheim in 1970.

=== Jewish history ===
As early as the Middle Ages, there were individual Jews living in Merxheim. In 1301, Abraham von Merxheim was named as a creditor of Counts Simon and Johannes of Sponheim. Thereafter, though, no Jews were mentioned as being in the village until the mid 16th century – when they were turned out of the village by the Vögte of Hunolstein. The Vögte then forbade their subjects to do any further business with Jews or to engage in moneylending with them. In 1560, Jud Aaron (the title "Jud" identified him as Jewish), who lived in Simmern unter Dhaun (now called Simmertal), complained to the Rhinegravial administrator in Daun about Jews being forbidden to do business in Merxheim. The modern Jewish community arose in the 17th century, when a few Jewish families settled in Merxheim, mainly in the area of the Judengasse ("Jews' Lane"), which still exists today, although it is now known as Römerstraße ("Romans' Street"). Towards the end of the 18th century, the number of Jews in the village had shrunk: In 1801, there was only one Jewish family still living in Merxheim, Jacob Bär's family, who lived at the so-called Freihaus ("Free House"), a former noble seat across the street from the church (today: Hauptstraße 22). In 1801, they fell victim to Schinderhannes (see below). In the 19th century, the number of Jewish inhabitants developed as follows: in 1808, there were 37, of whom 21 were children; in 1855, 52; in 1861, 65 (peak); in 1895, 43 (of all together about 1,300 inhabitants). Also belonging to the Jewish community in Merxheim were the Jews living in Simmern unter Dhaun (Simmertal), although they did have their own prayer room. The Jewish families lived mostly in very humble economic circumstances. This explains the relatively quick flight to the towns and cities, as was the case with the horse dealer Daniel Fried II, who together with nine family members moved in 1870 to Sobernheim, where his particular trade was seeing a great upswing as a result of both the railway connections and the then current Franco-Prussian War. In the way of institutions, there were a synagogue (see Synagogue below), a Jewish school, a mikveh and a graveyard (see Jewish graveyard below). There was already Jewish schooling by 1829: religious instruction in the Oberamt of Meisenheim was held at two venues, alternating between Meisenheim and Merxheim. The village's Jewish parents made efforts at that time to have their children schooled together with those from neighbouring Bärweiler, but this came to naught. One member of Merxheim's Jewish community was a soldier in the Franco-Prussian War (1870-1871), Leopold Loeb. He died in the year 1922. His name is to be found on the war memorial in the village centre. One member of Merxheim's Jewish community died as a result of wounds sustained in the First World War, Karl Michel (d. November 1918), while another, Arthur Loeb, was awarded the Iron Cross, First Class. About 1924, when there was still a Jewish community of 31 persons in Merxheim, the community's leader was L. Loeb. In 1932, it was Bernhard Michel.

In 1933, the year when Adolf Hitler and the Nazis seized power, 24 Jews were still living in Merxheim. In the years that followed, though, all of them moved away or even emigrated in the face of the boycotting of their businesses, the progressive stripping of their rights and repression, all brought about by the Nazis. By early November 1938, only two were left in the village, but they left after Kristallnacht (9–10 November 1938). According to the Gedenkbuch – Opfer der Verfolgung der Juden unter der nationalsozialistischen Gewaltherrschaft in Deutschland 1933-1945 ("Memorial Book – Victims of the Persecution of the Jews under National Socialist Tyranny") and Yad Vashem, of all Jews who either were born in Merxheim or lived there for a long time, 17 were victims of Nazi persecution (birthdates in brackets):

1. Albert Fried (1870)
2. Josef Fried (1868)
3. Moses Fried (1866)
4. Arthur Löb (1891)
5. Bertha Löb née Hirsch (1862)
6. Ida Löb (1927)
7. Klara Löb née Bloch (1900)
8. Rosa Löb née Hirsch (1857)
9. Bernhard Michel (1866)
10. Berthold Michel (1895)
11. Blanche Michel née Seckler (1904)- wife of Walter Michel - she lived with him in Luxemburg, not in Merxheim
12. Elvira Michel née Joseph (1869)
13. Fajga Michel née Benedik (1904) - wife of Berthold Michel - she lived with him in Cologne and Amsterdam, not in Merxheim
14. Jakob Michel (1900)
15. Salomon (Sally) Michel (1898)
16. Walter Michel (1901)
17. Lina Siegel née Mayer (1880)

=== Criminal history ===
Like many places in the region, Merxheim can claim to have had its dealings with the notorious outlaw Schinderhannes (or Johannes Bückler, to use his true name). In 1801, he and some of his accomplices committed a home invasion in Merxheim. The victims were the village's only Jewish inhabitants, the Family Bär. Their house was pillaged and the household head Jacob Bär was badly injured.

=== Population development ===
Merxheim's population development since Napoleonic times is shown in the table below. The figures for the years from 1871 to 1987 are drawn from census data:

Year	Inhabitants
1815	992
1835	N.A.
1871	1,281
1905	1,262
1939	1,190

Year	Inhabitants
1950	1,338
1961	1,435
1970	1,433
1987	1,374
2005	1,465

== Religion ==
As at 30 November 2013, there are 1,459 full-time residents in Merxheim, and of those, 843 are Evangelical (57.779%), 374 are Catholic (25.634%), 7 are Lutheran (0.48%), 1 is United Methodist (0.069%), 15 (1.028%) belong to other religious groups and 219 (15.01%) either have no religion or will not reveal their religious affiliation.

== Politics ==
=== Municipal council ===
The council is made up of 16 council members, who were elected by proportional representation at the municipal election held on 7 June 2009, and the honorary mayor as chairman. The municipal election held on 7 June 2009 yielded the following results:

Year	SPD	CDU	FWG	Total
2009	7	3	6	16 seats
2004	7	4	5	16 seats

=== Mayor ===
Merxheim's mayor is Egon Eckhardt (SPD), and his deputies are Elke Schmidt (SPD), Thomas Bendlage (CDU) and Fethi Bayer (SPD).

== Coat of arms ==
The German blazon reads: Über goldenem Schildfuß, darin ein roter Balken über drei roten Schindeln, von Rot und Silber gespalten. Vorne ein silberner Schrägbalken belegt mit drei roten Rosen, hinten ein roter Burgturm mit Krüppelwalmdach.

House of Hunolstein arms

The municipality's arms might in English heraldic language be described thus: Per pale gules a bend argent with three roses of the field and argent a castle tower with half-hip roof of the first, the base Or with fess above three billets of the first.

Appearing as a witness as early as 1075 in a document from Archbishop Udo of Trier was a man named Albert von Merkedesheim. In 1437, Rorich of Merxheim bore arms gules a bend argent with three roses of the field, the composition now seen on the dexter (armsbearer's right, viewer's left) side in Merxheim's arms. Earlier, in 1128, Rorich and Gerlach of Merxheim were witnesses in a document from Archbishop Adalbert of Mainz. The Vögte of Hunolstein were the ones who held sway over the village the longest. A reduced form of their arms can be seen in the base of Merxheim's arms. Their full arms are shown at right. Seen on the sinister (armsbearer's left, viewer's right) side in Merxheim's arms is a charge depicting, in stylized form, a building that for centuries was Merxheim's defining landmark, the old Nürnberger Turm ("Nuremberg Tower"), which burnt down in the great fire that beset the village on 24 July 1870. A memorial to it now stands on a roundabout in Merxheim. It appears with its singular half-hip roof.

== Culture and sightseeing ==
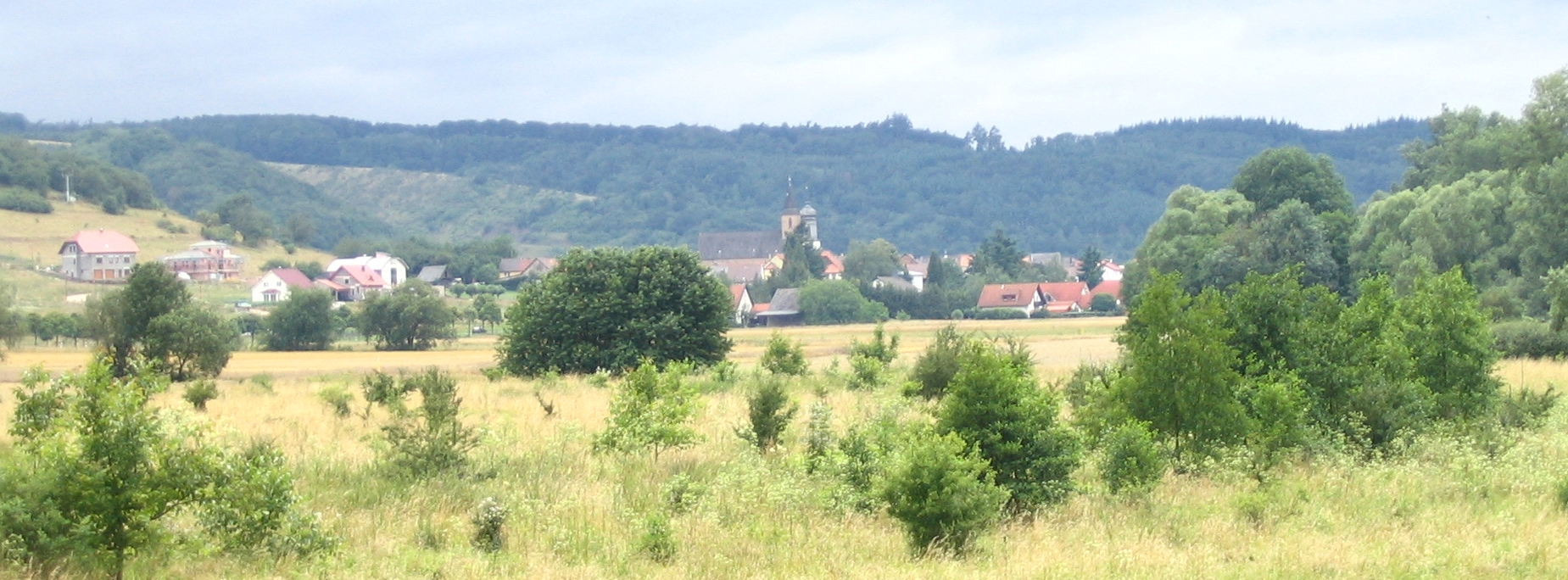
Panorama of Merxheim from the north, as seen from Monzingen

=== Buildings ===
The following are listed buildings or sites in Rhineland-Palatinate's Directory of Cultural Monuments:

- Evangelical church, Hauptstraße 17 – Gothic Revival sandstone-block building, 1874
- Saint Charles Borromeo's Catholic Parish Church (Pfarrkirche St. Borromäus), Hauptstraße 19 – former Schloss of the Vogtei of Hunolstein, long Classicist plastered building, 1791 and later, Saint Charles Borromeo's Catholic Parish Church built into the east part in 1817, into the west part a Catholic school, ridge turret 1865, Neoclassical tower 1919
- Bachstraße 17 – estate complex; Renaissance building, about 1574
- At Großstraße 28 – staircase tower remnant, Late Gothic, marked 1572
- Großstraße 34 – town hall, Renaissance building, 1570, gateway arch 1779
- Hahnenstraße 4 – Baroque building with half-hip roof, timber framing plastered, 18th century
- Hauptstraße 4 – complex with single roof ridge; building with half-hip roof, partly slated timber-frame, marked 1811
- At Hauptstraße 22/24 – Renaissance gateway arch, 1592; sundial, about 1700
- At Hauptstraße 32 – portal, marked 1622
- Hauptstraße 61 – one-and-a-half-floor Late Gründerzeit villalike clinker brick building, marked 1903
- Hauptstraße/corner of Großstraße – warriors' memorial 1914-1918, sandstone obelisk, after 1920
- Gänsmühle (mill), on the Nahe, north of the village – stately Late Classicist house with spire light and knee wall, about 1860; side building of brick
- Jewish graveyard, "Auf der Rothhell" (monumental zone) – area with 51 gravestones from 1830 to 1936 (see also below)

=== Synagogue ===
In the earlier half of the 19th century, there might have been a prayer room in one of the Jewish houses. In 1853, the Jewish community managed to build a modest synagogue on the street then called Judengasse, but nowadays called Römerstraße. It was meant as a central synagogue for Jewish families from not only Merxheim but also Meddersheim, Bärweiler, Martinstein and Simmertal. All together, there were about 120 members of this community in these five villages. In the summer of 1870, the synagogue burnt down. The by then already shrinking Jewish community, despite its determined efforts, found it impossible to muster the wherewithal needed to build a new one. Jewish worship was thereafter held at the Family Stern's house (Hauptstraße 13). The gutted synagogue ruin was sold in the early 20th century. The last efforts to build the synagogue anew were undertaken in 1910 with the help of a collection, but the outbreak of the First World War, the plans were shelved. It is believed that services were still being held at the Family Stern's house as late as the 1920s. When the house acquired a new owner, however, it meant the end for any Jewish services in Merxheim.

=== Jewish graveyard ===
It is unknown when the Jewish graveyard in Merxheim was laid out. The oldest readable gravestones date to the mid 19th century (1849). The last burial took place there in either 1936 (Emma Michel, d. 13 June 1936) or 1938. The graveyard's area is 7,823 m^{2}, making it the district's biggest Jewish graveyard. An area of 2,928 m^{2} of the total is fenced in. A registration of the gravestones that was clearly undertaken about 1900 identified at least 837 of them. The fenced-in area, though, nowadays only has 51 graves marked with gravestones. This is where the 1849 gravestone stands. The graveyard was presumably long used by Jewish families in Bärweiler and Meddersheim as well. The graveyard lies southwest of Merxheim on the pathway across the heights at a woodland called "Meckenbacher Wald". It can be reached on foot from the village in about half an hour.

=== Lookout ===
Merxheim also has a lookout platform that affords an outstanding view of the Nahe valley.

=== Clubs ===
The following clubs are active in Merxheim:

- Angelsportverein "Hecht" — angling club
- CDU Ortsverband Merxheim — Christian Democratic Union of Germany local chapter
- Deutsch-Russischer-Chor — German-Russian choir
- Fastnachtsclub Merxheimer Wind — Shrovetide Carnival (Fastnacht) club
- Förderverein freiwillige Feuerwehr — fire brigade promotional association
- Förderverein Jugendabteilung FC "Viktoria" Merxheim e.V. — "Viktoria" football club youth department promotional association
- Freie Wählergemeinschaft Merxheim — Free Voters association
- Freiwillige Feuerwehr — volunteer fire brigade
- Fussballclub "Viktoria" — football club
- Gemischter Chor — mixed choir
- Kinderchor — children's choir
- Kindergartenförderverein — kindergarten promotional association
- Landfrauen Merxheim — countrywomen's club
- MGV Cäcilienverein — men's singing club
- MGV Harmonie — men's singing club
- MGV Liederkranz — men's singing club
- Musikzug Merxheim — band
- SPD Ortsverein Merxheim — Social Democratic Party of Germany local chapter
- Theatergruppe Merxheim Vergess de' Text e.V. — theatre group
- Turnverein 1903 Merxheim e.V. — gymnastic club
- Verein "Jugendraum alte Schule Merxheim" — old Merxheim school youth room

== Economy and infrastructure ==
=== Transport ===
Running north of Merxheim is Bundesstraße 41. Serving Martinstein is a railway station on the Nahe Valley Railway (Bingen–Saarbrücken).
