= Langenthal, Rhineland-Palatinate =

Langenthal
- Municipality
- Coat of arms

- Location of Langenthal within Bad Kreuznach district
- Interactive map of Langenthal
- Location within Germany Location within Rhineland-Palatinate
- Coordinates: 49°49′50″N 7°34′31″E
- Country: Germany
- State: Rhineland-Palatinate
- District: Bad Kreuznach
- Municipal assoc.: Nahe-Glan

Government
  - Mayor (2019–24): Diethelm Stallmann

Area
  - Total: 2.71 km^{2} (1.05 sq mi)
- Elevation: 230 m (750 ft)

Population (2025-12-31)
  - Total: 86
  - Density: 32/km^{2} (82/sq mi)
- Time zone: UTC+01:00 (CET)
  - Summer (DST): UTC+02:00 (CEST)
- Postal codes: 55569
- Dialling codes: 06754
- Vehicle registration: KH

Langenthal is an Ortsgemeinde – a municipality belonging to a Verbandsgemeinde, a kind of collective municipality – in the Bad Kreuznach district in Rhineland-Palatinate, Germany. It belongs to the Verbandsgemeinde Nahe-Glan.

== Geography ==
=== Location ===
Langenthal lies in the Hoxbach and Gaulsbach valley, a side valley of the Nahe.

=== Neighbouring municipalities ===
Clockwise from the north, Langenthal's neighbours are the town of Bad Sobernheim (although only its northern exclave containing Pferdsfeld, not the section containing the townsite), and the municipalities of Auen, Monzingen, Weiler bei Monzingen and Seesbach, all of which likewise lie within the Bad Kreuznach district.

== History ==
Langenthal's name cropped up for the first time in 1322 and it refers to a narrow dale that stretches along a watercourse. Langenthal was until the 18th century united with neighbouring Monzingen, to whose market business it had been attached. No later than the 13th century, it belonged to the Counts of Sponheim, who had granted some knightly families the court and the tithes (Emmerich von Nussbaum and after him Klaus von Ellenbach in the 14th century). In 1708, Langenthal passed along with some other places to Electoral Palatinate, and within that to the Amt of Böckelheim. In 1798, after French Revolutionary troops had overrun the German lands on the Rhine’s left bank, it was assigned to the Mairie (“Mayoralty”) of Monzingen. The court to which Langenthal was subject, called the Friedensgericht (“Peace Court”), had its seat in Sobernheim. This was converted into an Amtsgericht in 1879 (after Germany was unified). After the Napoleonic Wars had ended and Napoleon had been driven out and defeated, the Congress of Vienna assigned this administrative region to the Kingdom of Prussia. Monzingen remained the seat of a Bürgermeisterei (“mayoralty”) within the newly formed Kreuznach district, to which Langenthal also belonged. In the course of administrative restructuring in Rhineland-Palatinate after the Second World War, Langenthal found itself grouped into the Verbandsgemeinde of Bad Sobernheim.

=== Population development ===
Langenthal's population development since Napoleonic times is shown in the table below. The figures for the years from 1871 to 1987 are drawn from census data:

Year	Inhabitants
1815	97
1835	167
1871	185
1905	151
1939	121

Year	Inhabitants
1950	127
1961	123
1970	125
1987	116
2005	101

== Religion ==
As at 30 September 2013, there are 99 full-time residents in Langenthal, and of those, 57 are Evangelical (57.576%), 29 are Catholic (29.293%) and 13 (13.131%) either have no religion or will not reveal their religious affiliation.

== Politics ==
=== Municipal council ===
The council is made up of 6 council members, who were elected by majority vote at the municipal election held on 7 June 2009, and the honorary mayor as chairman.

=== Mayor ===
Langenthal's mayor is Diethelm Stallmann.

=== Coat of arms ===
The German blazon reads: Im Schild in Rot ein silberner Wellenschrägbalken, begleitet vorne von einem silbernen sechsspeichigen Rad, hinten von einer silbernen Kapelle.

The municipality's arms might in English heraldic language be described thus: Gules a bend wavy between in dexter base a wheel spoked of six and in sinister chief a chapel, all argent.

The wavy bend (slanted stripe) symbolizes the long Hoxbach and Gaulsbach valley, on which the village lies. The charge on the sinister (armsbearer's left, viewer's right) side, the chapel, is the village church, which was built towards the end of the 15th century, expanded in the 16th century and renovated in 1954. Even today, both the Evangelical and the Catholic communities have rights to this house of worship. The other charge, the Wheel of Mainz on the dexter (armsbearer's right, viewer's left) side, was taken from Monzingen’s arms, as Langenthal, first mentioned in 1322, shared a common municipal area with Monzingen until the 17th century and thereby had much the same history as its neighbour.

== Culture and sightseeing ==
=== Buildings ===
The following are listed buildings or sites in Rhineland-Palatinate’s Directory of Cultural Monuments:

- Evangelical church, Hauptstraße 22 – Late Gothic aisleless church, late 15th and early 16th centuries
- Near Hauptstraße 4 – Baroque house (with ground-floor stable?), partly timber-frame, possibly from about 1700
- Hauptstraße 12 – estate complex along the street, 18th or 19th century; one-floor house with ground-floor stable, partly timber-frame, barn, partly timber-frame

== Economy and infrastructure ==
=== Transport ===
Running to the south is Bundesstraße 41. Serving neighbouring Monzingen is a railway station on the Nahe Valley Railway (Bingen–Saarbrücken). There is a bus service linking Langenthal to Monzingen.
