= Monzingen =

- Municipality
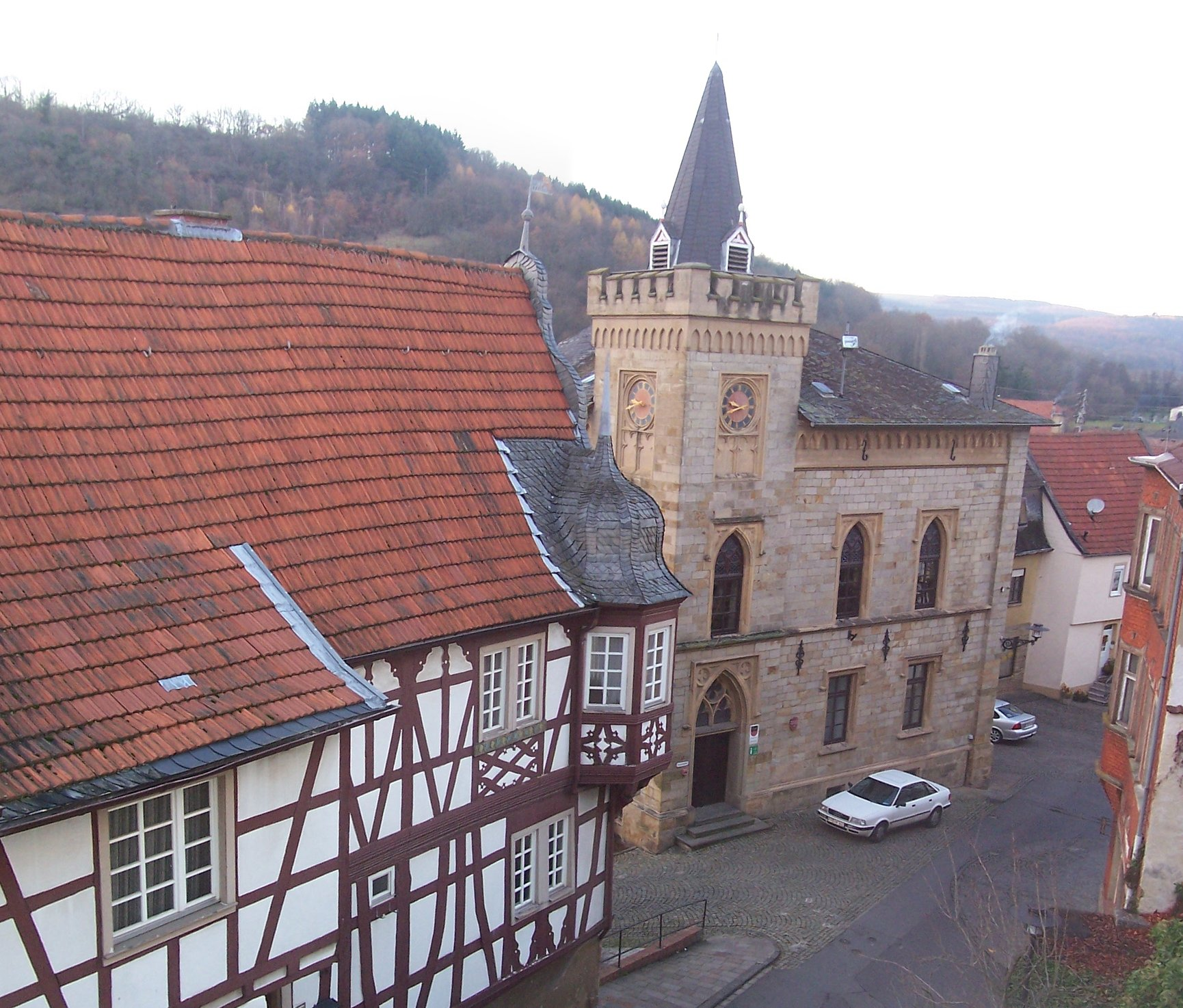

- Coat of arms

- Location of Monzingen within Bad Kreuznach district
- Interactive map of Monzingen
- Location within Germany Location within Rhineland-Palatinate
- Coordinates: 49°47′57″N 7°35′28″E
- Country: Germany
- State: Rhineland-Palatinate
- District: Bad Kreuznach
- Municipal assoc.: Nahe-Glan

Government
  - Mayor (2019–24): Klaus Stein

Area
  - Total: 12.18 km^{2} (4.70 sq mi)
- Elevation: 180 m (590 ft)

Population (2025-12-31)
  - Total: 1,568
  - Density: 128.7/km^{2} (333.4/sq mi)
- Time zone: UTC+01:00 (CET)
  - Summer (DST): UTC+02:00 (CEST)
- Postal codes: 55569
- Dialling codes: 06751
- Vehicle registration: KH
- Website: www.Monzingen.de www.meinMonzingen.de

Monzingen is an Ortsgemeinde – a municipality belonging to a Verbandsgemeinde, a kind of collective municipality – in the Bad Kreuznach district in Rhineland-Palatinate, Germany. It belongs to the Verbandsgemeinde of Nahe-Glan, whose seat is in the like-named town. Monzingen is a more than 1,200-year-old winegrowing village and a state-recognized recreational resort (Erholungsort).

== Geography ==
=== Location ===
Monzingen lies in a side valley of the Middle Nahe, flowing through which is the Gaulsbach. To the north, east and west, the village is framed by mountains that reach 250 to 300 m above sea level, whereas to the south, the valley opens out towards the River Nahe. The village's centre is formed by the 200 m-high Kirchberg (“Church Hill”) on which stands the 13th-century Martinskirche (Saint Martin's Church). The houses stretch along a mountain slope that gently falls off from west to east. The newest buildings stand mainly on an easterly hill towards Nußbaum, looming above the old village core with its historical buildings. To the south in the Nahe valley, across Bundesstraße 41 and the Nahe Valley Railway, lie the commercial park, sport facilities and one of the Nahe valley's biggest campgrounds. The surrounding mountain slopes are covered with mixed forest or, on the south slopes, are mainly used for winegrowing. A few vineyards that were long ago given up are now covered with bush. On the steep slopes of the well known Monzingen vineyards Frühlingsplätzchen and Halenberg, however, there is still intensive winegrowing.

=== Neighbouring municipalities ===
Clockwise from the north, Monzingen's neighbours are the municipality of Auen, the town of Bad Sobernheim (although this is in fact the outlying piece of that town's municipal area, a mostly rural swathe of land, not the one containing the actual town) and the municipalities of Nußbaum, Meddersheim, Merxheim, Weiler bei Monzingen and Langenthal, all of which likewise lie within the Bad Kreuznach district.

=== Constituent communities ===
Also belonging to Monzingen is the outlying homestead of Nahemühle.

== History ==
Monzingen is among the oldest settlements in the Nahe valley. Without a doubt there was already a settlement of farmers and hunters around the mountain spur more than 2,000 years ago. From Celtic and Roman times and later, to the Frankish taking of the land, a wealth of archaeological finds has come to light. The oldest preserved record of Monzingen comes from a directory of holdings kept by Lorsch Abbey (east of Worms), from AD 778. The oldest known forms of the village's name are Monzecha and Munzaher. It is also known from the Lorsch document that there was already winegrowing in Monzingen then. The settlement lay in a favourable spot up a sheltered side valley, around a crag halfway up a slope that also bore a holy sanctuary, as in now does a church, away from any floodwaters that might come up from the Nahe of the Gaulsbach. It can be assumed that during the Middle Ages, a kind of village castle arose around the Kirchberg (“Church Hill”) to afford the villagers greater security. Beginning in 1281, the Archbishop of Mainz held considerable rights and estates in Monzingen. In 1355, Monzingen was granted town rights, thereby also acquiring the right to hold a market, run its own court and, particularly, to fortify itself to protect the villagers and their belongings. In 1430, Monzingen was burnt down in a war between two claimants to the seat of Bishop and Archbishop of Mainz. In 1466, it was pledged along with Böckelheim by Mainz to the Dukes of Palatinate-Zweibrücken. In 1471 it was conquered by Electoral Palatinate troops. The church is, at least in its northwestern parts, a building from the 12th century. Towards 1300, it was thoroughly converted. The Gothic quire comes from 1488. In the 17th and 18th centuries, further building was undertaken, and again in 1860, 1923 and even very recently. In this last round of work, wall paintings from the 15th century were uncovered. The Electoral Palatinate leadership lastingly introduced the Reformation in the years 1550-1560. As in the whole Rhenish region, the Thirty Years' War wrought great damage and loss in Monzingen. In 1636, there were only 25 townsfolk living here; 50 had died. Beginning in 1792, French Revolutionary troops conquered the Nahe country. Thus ended the people's hereditary duty of allegiance to the various princes and landlords. After the end of Napoleonic times in the wars of 1813-1815, this administrative zone of Monzingen was assigned in 1816 to the Kingdom of Prussia at the Congress of Vienna. Monzingen remained the seat of a Bürgermeisterei (“mayoralty”) within the then newly formed Kreuznach district. With the building of the Nahe-Saar Railway in the years 1856-1860 and a few better roads, gradually some new development began. In the course of administrative restructuring in Rhineland-Palatinate, the Amtsbürgermeisterei of Monzingen became a Verbandsgemeinde in 1969 but then the following year it was dissolved altogether. Monzingen was then grouped into the Verbandsgemeinde of Sobernheim (which has since become the Verbandsgemeinde of Bad Sobernheim).

=== Jewish history ===
Monzingen had a small Jewish community until the early 20th century. Its beginnings might have gone back at least to the 18th century. Beginning in the 1770s, the widower Isaak bar Veis, or Isaak Sohn des Veis – a German translation of his name (it would be “Isaac Veis’s Son” in English) – was being named. He was from Monzingen (b. 1742) and married Sophie Moses David in Becherbach. The couple had three sons, Peter (b. 1789), Simon (b. 1792) and Michael (b. 1795). In the 19th century, the number of Jewish inhabitants developed as follows: in 1858, there were 64 (5.1% of all together 1,267 inhabitants, 1,128 Evangelical, 75 Catholic); in 1895, 23 (1.8% of all together 1,258 inhabitants, 1,195 Evangelical, 40 Catholic). From the 1870s onwards, the numbers of Jewish inhabitants shrank sharply: between 1872 and 1890, seven Jewish families left Monzingen. Particularly common surnames among Monzingen's Jewish families were Fried, Mayer and Ullmann; these names can be read on the Jewish gravestones from Monzingen preserved in Bad Sobernheim. In the way of institutions, there were a prayer room (known in the village as the Judenschule, or “Jewish school” or the “synagogue” – see Synagogue below), a mikveh (which was in the same building as the “synagogue”, itself wedged between the houses now at Hauptstraße 58 and Franziskastraße 1) and a graveyard (see Jewish graveyard below). Jewish schoolchildren attended the Evangelical public school, which was the village's only school; Catholic schoolchildren attended this as well. Each group, though, received religious education separately. About 1920, almost every Jewish inhabitant had already moved out of Monzingen, leaving only one, Jettchen Ullmann, known as the Ullmanns-Bas – the last part of the nickname is apparently an archaic word for “cousin” – who was born in 1856). The building that contained the Jewish prayer room was no longer used and in the time that followed it fell into disrepair. Until about 1950, there was still a heap of rubble at that spot. About 1960-1964, remnants of the former mikveh could still be made out. Today (2012), the site is in a thoroughly run-down state. In the time of the Third Reich, the Jewish graveyard was eliminated and the gravestones were removed to Bad Sobernheim. According to the Gedenkbuch – Opfer der Verfolgung der Juden unter der nationalsozialistischen Gewaltherrschaft in Deutschland 1933-1945 ("Memorial Book – Victims of the Persecution of the Jews under National Socialist Tyranny") and Yad Vashem, of all Jews who either were born in Monzingen or lived there for a long time, three were victims of Nazi persecution (birthdates and other information in brackets):

1. Else Ermann (b. 1903 in Monzingen)
2. Rosalie (Rosa) Jakob (b. 1860 in Monzingen)
3. Penas Paul Wolff (b. 1878 in Wawern, married in 1908 and moved to Monzingen with Bertha née Ullmann, lived until 1920 at house no. 207, later in Frankfurt, deported thence)

=== Municipality’s name ===
Early forms of Monzingen's name such as Monzecha, Munzaher and Monzaha derived from a Frankish settler's name (Munt/Mund) with the suffix —aha or —ach, which meant “(flowing) water”. Over the ages, the name evolved into its modern form. The following spellings, among others, are known:

Year	Spelling	Remarks
1061	Munzecha
1074	villa Munzichum
1197	Munziche
1283	Monzecho
1297	Moncichen
1355	Muntziche	in deed conferring town rights
1380	Montzingen
1421	Muntzingen
1494	Montzingen

=== Population development ===
Monzingen's population development since Napoleonic times is shown in the table below. The figures for the years from 1871 to 1987 are drawn from census data:

Year	Inhabitants
1815	962
1835	1,201
1871	1,168
1905	1,167
1939	1,133

Year	Inhabitants
1950	1,245
1961	1,381
1970	1,496
1987	1,545
2005	1,731

== Religion ==
As at 30 November 2013, there are 1,607 full-time residents in Monzingen, and of those, 1,072 are Evangelical (66.708%), 206 are Catholic (12.819%), 4 are Lutheran (0.249%), 2 belong to the Palatinate State Free Religious Community (0.124%), 1 is Russian Orthodox (0.062%), 44 (2.738%) belong to other religious groups and 278 (17.299%) either have no religion or will not reveal their religious affiliation.

== Politics ==
=== Municipal council ===
The council is made up of 16 council members, who were elected by personalized proportional representation at the municipal election held on 7 June 2009, and the honorary mayor as chairman. However, owing to a formal defect that was detected in the electoral oversight, this election was in fact invalidated and then held again on 25 October 2009. That vote yielded the following results:

Date	SPD	CDU	FDP	FWG	Total
25-10-2009	8	2	4	2	16 seats
07-06-2009	7	2	4	3	16 seats
13-06-2004	7	2	3	4	16 seats

=== Mayors ===
- 1948–1962: Karl Thöne
- 1962–1972: Hugo Dämgen (FWG)
- 1972–1986: Erich Schauß (FDP)
- 1986–1990: Willi Böttcher (SPD)
- 1990–2009: Adolf Geib (SPD)
- 2009–2014: Norbert Alt (SPD)
- 2014-2019: Hans-Jürgen Eckert (independent)
- 2019-: Klaus Stein

Hugo Dämgen was actually the head of the Amt (Amtsbürgermeister) under the old system before 1972, as Monzingen still was a growing city.

Monzingen's current mayor is Klaus Stein, elected in 2019.

=== Coat of arms ===
The German blazon reads: In von Schwarz und Rot geteiltem Schild oben ein schreitender rotbezungter doppelschwänziger goldener Löwe, unten ein silbernes sechsspeichiges Rad.

The municipality's arms might in English heraldic language be described thus: Per fess sable a lion passant Or tail forked langued gules, and gules a wheel spoked of six argent.

Monzingen's arms originally had only a single, undivided field with one charge, the wheel still seen now; the field was gules (red). This wheel was the heraldic device borne by the Archbishopric of Mainz, the Wheel of Mainz. The arms, however, eventually became party per fess (that is, divided into two fields horizontally), and the former composition was assigned to the lower field, while the new upper field bore its own charge, a lion. This is the Palatine Lion. The two charges refer to Monzingen's former overlords, the Electorate of Mainz and Electoral Palatinate.

=== Town partnerships ===
Monzingen fosters partnerships with the following places:

- Entrains-sur-Nohain, Nièvre, France

In 1963 and 1964, the then two mayors, Hugo Dämgen (Monzingen) and M. Billon (Entrains-sur-Nohain) did their part to strengthen Franco-German relations by forging this partnership. Today, many families who participate in the exchanges between the two villages – which lie just under 600 km apart – have known each other for decades.

== Culture and sightseeing ==
=== Buildings ===
The following are listed buildings or sites in Rhineland-Palatinate’s Directory of Cultural Monuments:

- Evangelical parish church, Kirchstraße – formerly Saint Willigis's and Saint Martin's, three-naved basilica, 12th to 15th centuries; south side nave partly Romanesque; vestry late 13th century; quire, 1488, architect Philipp von Gemünd; square chapel, 1505
- Village core (monumental zone) – village area within the precincts of the former town wall (the remnants of which are located on, among other streets, Soonwaldstraße and Straße Zur Stadtmauer), 14th century onwards, with a number of historic monuments and buildings, among them timber-frame houses from the 16th to early 19th centuries
- Am Untertor 3 – Baroque building with half-hip roof, timber framing plastered, 18th century, essentially possibly older
- Bachstraße 5 – Baroque timber-frame house, partly solid, mid 18th century
- At Bachstraße 7 – Renaissance portal, marked 1608
- Franziskastraße 1 – Baroque timber-frame house, plastered, possibly from the 18th century, marked 1846
- Hauptstraße, graveyard – three-part Classicist graveyard portal, about 1830 (about 1871)
- Hauptstraße 13 – former school (?); angular building with hip roof, Heimatstil, about 1914
- Hauptstraße 45 – house; Late Classicist building with half-hip roof, marked 1850
- Hauptstraße 59 – so-called Alt’sches Haus; very ornate three-floor timber-frame house, marked 1589, gateway arch marked 1658.
- Hauptstraße 60 – Renaissance timber-frame house, possibly from the late 16th century, made over in the 18th or 19th century with former bakery, shop and oven
- At Hauptstraße 62 – Rococo house door leaf, about 1770/1780
- Hauptstraße 63 – Baroque timber-frame house, partly solid, marked 1680
- Hauptstraße 64 – ornate Renaissance timber-frame house, 16th century, conversion marked 1787
- Hauptstraße 66 – town hall; sandstone-block building, Gothic Revival with Late Classicist characteristics, 1861–1864, District Master Builder Conradi, Bad Kreuznach, conversion 1878, District Building Inspector Müller
- Hauptstraße 69 – Late Baroque building with hipped mansard roof, timber framing plastered, possibly from the latter half of the 18th century
- Hauptstraße 72 – former inn “Zum Weißen Roß” (“At the White Steed”); Baroque solid building, marked 1738, essentially possibly older
- Hauptstraße 74 – house; Renaissance building with corner oriel windows, marked 1574, staircase tower, Classicist door leaf marked 1835, barn, partly timber-frame
- Hauptstraße 78 – house; building with half-hip roof, partly timber-frame, essentially from the 17th century, marked 1823, commercial section marked 1774
- Hauptstraße 80 – building with half-hip roof, partly timber-frame, essentially possibly from about 1600, made over in Baroque in the 18th century, addition in the late 18th century
- Im Niederviertel 9 – plastered timber-frame house, front door with house mark, marked 1628
- Kirchstraße 3 – house, essentially from the 16th century, made over in the 18th and 19th centuries
- Kirchstraße 12 – three-floor Renaissance timber-frame house, partly slated, possibly between 1580 and 1600
- Kirchstraße 21? – plastered timber-frame house, essentially possibly Baroque 17th/18th century, marked 1789
- Lehrstraße 3 – Late Baroque timber-frame house, slated, marked 1781
- At Lehrstraße 5 – spolia, former portal lintel, 18th century, volute stone, marked 1737
- At Lehrstraße 10 – chimera, 17th/18th century
- At Rathausstraße 2 – house door, two-leafed, earlier half of the 19th century
- Rathausstraße 4 – timber-frame house, Late Baroque building with hipped mansard roof, partly timber-frame, marked 1764
- Rathausstraße 9 – Baroque building with half-hip roof, timber framing plastered, 18th century
- Soonwaldstraße 2 – Gründerzeit villa, Renaissance motifs, about 1880
- Zur Stadtmauer 2 – estate complex; plastered timber-frame house, 16th/17th century, stately side building, partly timber-frame, mansard roof, essentially possibly from about 1600
- Zur Stadtmauer 6 – estate complex along the street, 18th/19th century; timber-frame house, plastered, essentially possibly Baroque
- Zur Stadtmauer 7 – timber-frame house with knee wall, apparently from 1734, possibly partly from the early 16th century
- Vineyard house – possibly from about 1910/1920
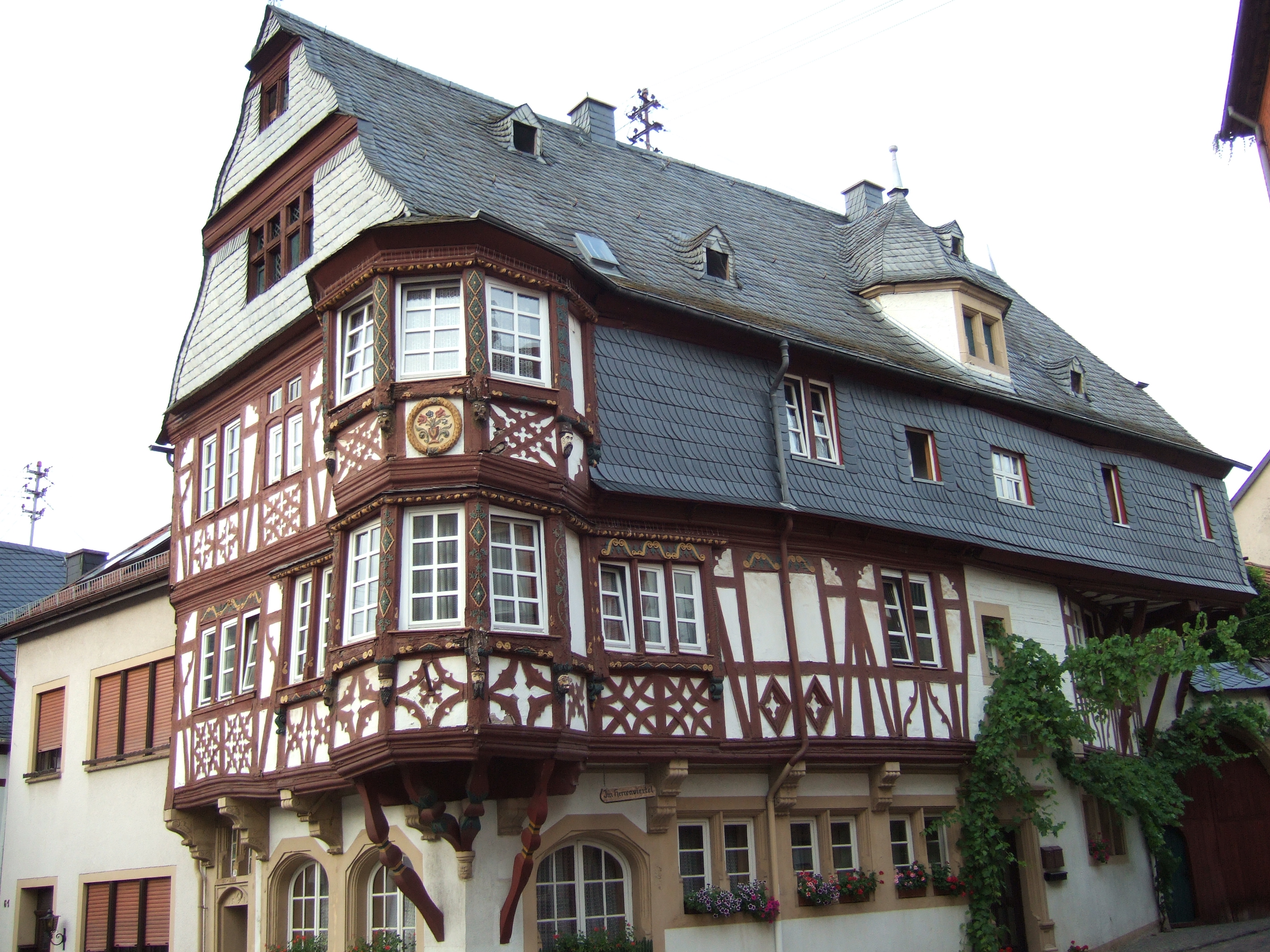
Hauptstraße 59 – so-called Alt’sches Haus

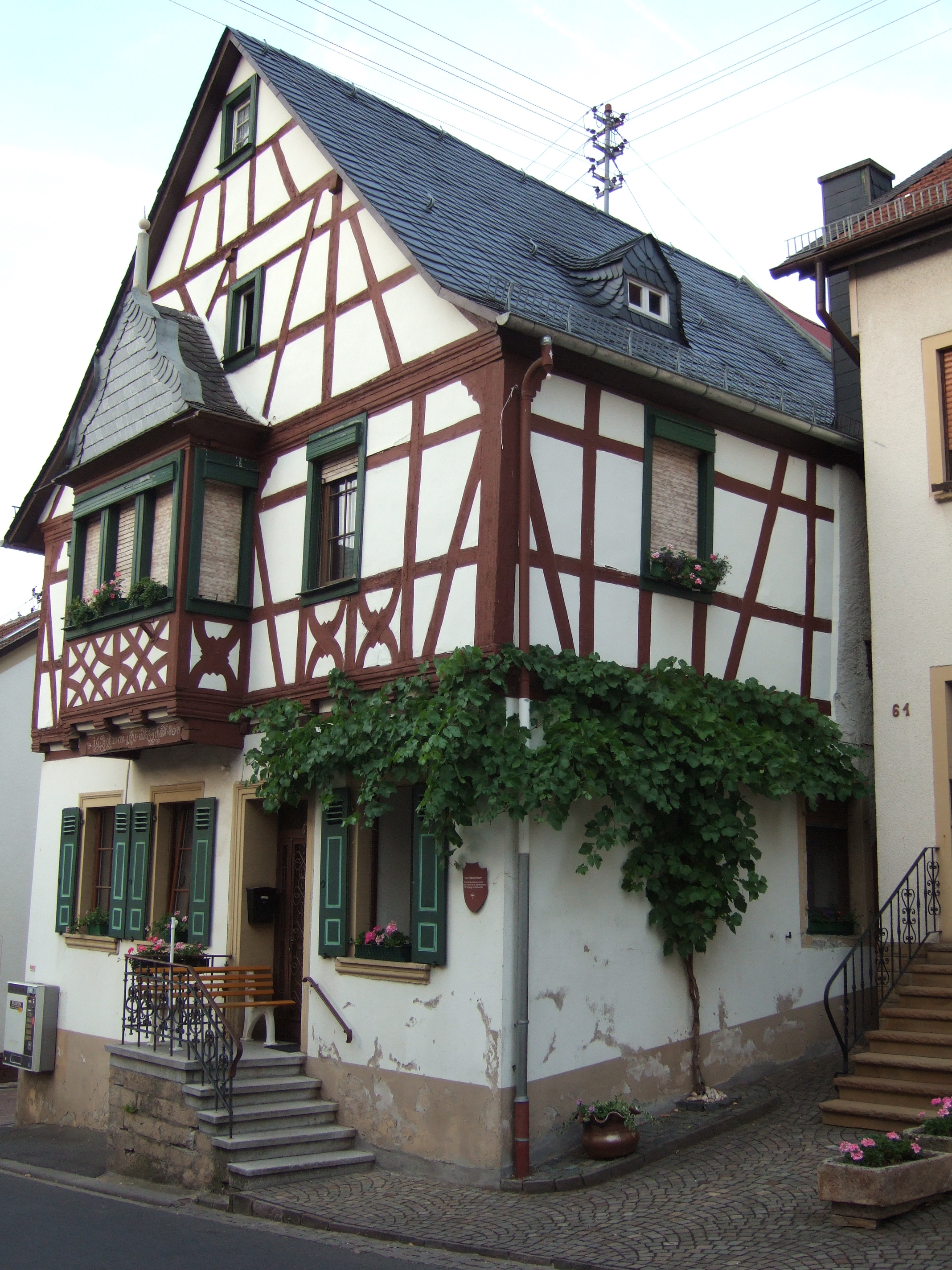
Hauptstraße 63 – Baroque timber-frame house

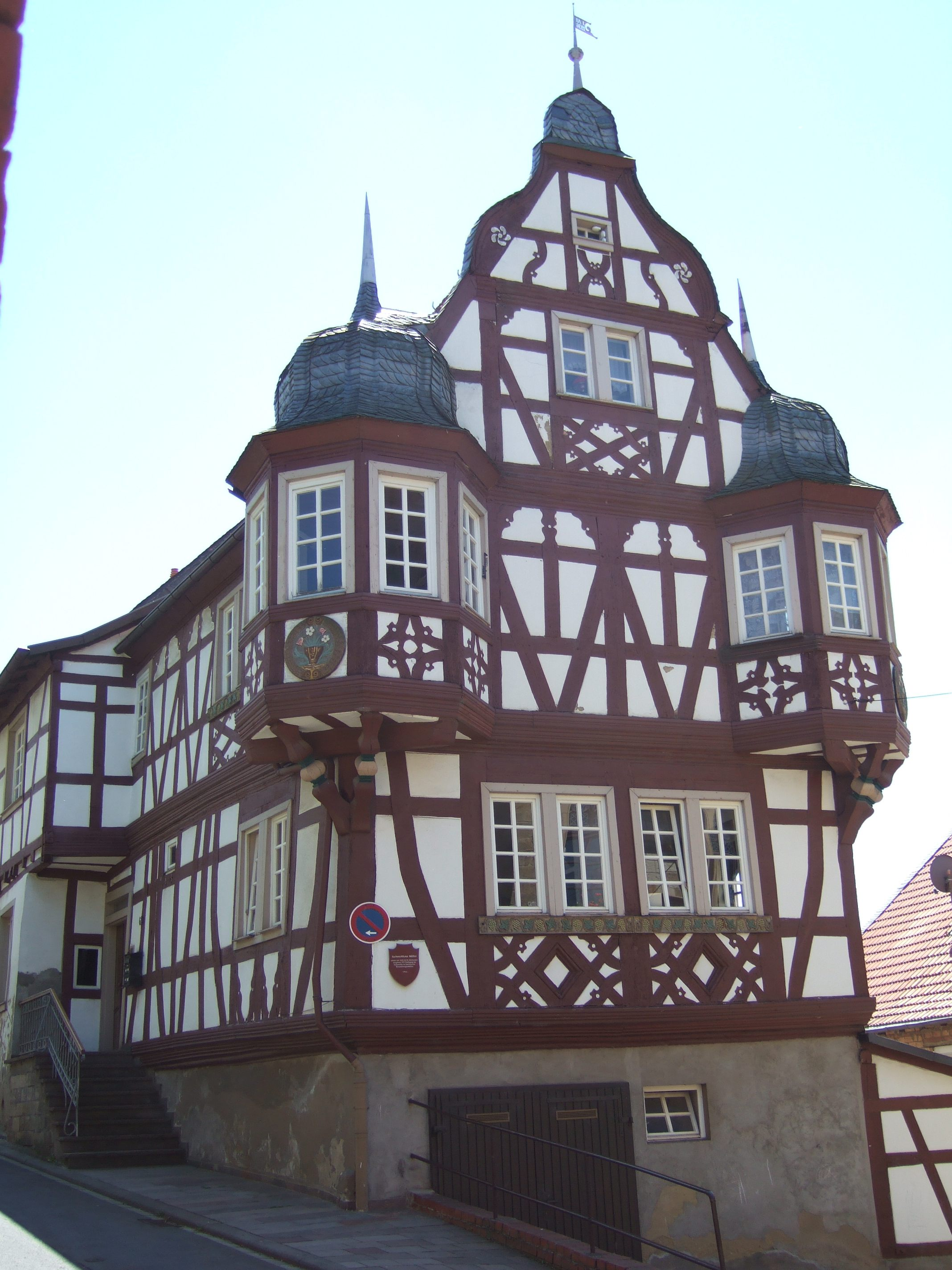
Hauptstraße 64 – ornate Renaissance timber-frame house

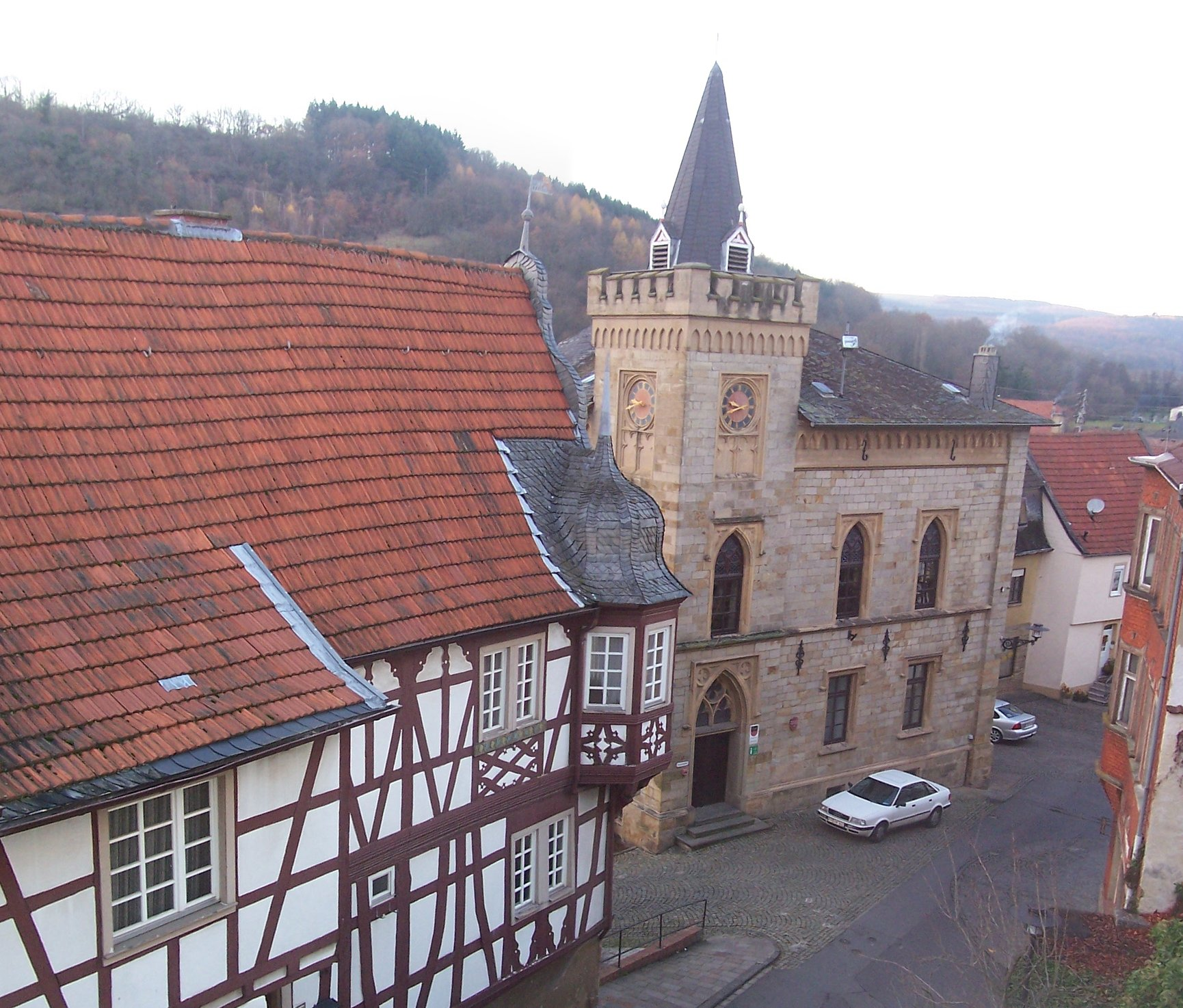
Hauptstraße 66 – town hall

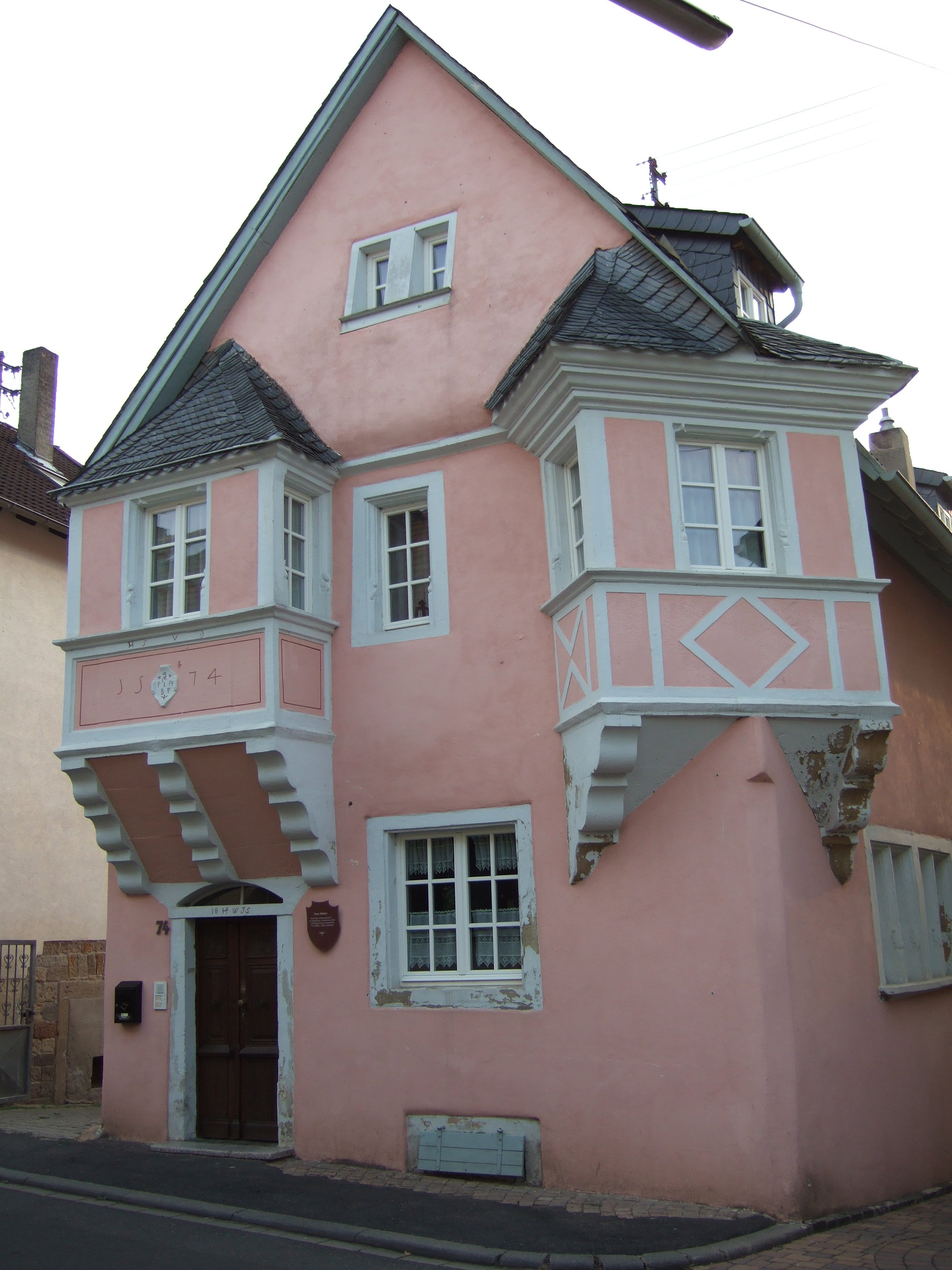
Hauptstraße 74 – house

=== Synagogue ===
There was no purpose-built synagogue in Monzingen. There was simply a prayer room in one of the Jewish houses, which for a while also housed the Jewish school. This building, whose site is to this day still called Judenschule (“Jewish school”), was from 1833 to 1892 under Jewish ownership. It is registered in the cadastral plan as an estate area (Hofraum), which at the time was the customary term for a house with a yard. After the owner moved to the Saarland, the house was sold to a Christian salesman. It is believed that no new prayer room was ever set up, as it could by then already be foreseen that the shrinking Jewish community would not be able to muster the ten men needed to form a minyan.

=== Jewish graveyard ===
The Jewish graveyard in Monzingen lay outside the old town wall. It is unknown when it was first laid out. In Flurbuch XIV (now kept at the Landeshauptarchiv Koblenz, stock 441/553; catalogue 730/553), the oldest map of the municipality of Monzingen, from 1830, the graveyard is marked. The gravestones formerly standing here but now preserved at the graveyard in Bad Sobernheim come from the years 1853 to 1913. In 1938, by which time Adolf Hitler had come to power in Germany, the graveyard had to be dissolved and levelled on the National Socialists’ orders. In early autumn of that year, the gravestones were removed and taken to the Bad Sobernheim graveyard and set up there. In connection with this deed, there is a story about Monzingen's last Jewish inhabitant, Jettchen Ullmann:

The last Jewish woman in Monzingen, Mrs. Jettchen Ullmann (b. 1856), had admonished a high party functionary about building a Hitler Youth clubhouse on the Jewish graveyard’s lands. The very elderly woman felt compelled to go on and on until she had made sure that the graveyard would not be passing into the party’s hands, but rather would be bought by a resident as building land for a head saw works. The stones were driven by workers from the firm Marum, then still owned by Alfred Marum, the last leader of the Sobernheim Jewish community, to Sobernheim, where for the most part they were stood in a row. At the same time, there were also some reburials, among them Ferdinand Ullmann, who had already died in 1907, Jettchen Ullmann’s husband.

Older inhabitants in Monzingen remember that the graveyard was found in the village's southwest, right outside the town wall. Even by the late 1940s, parts of the wall from around the entrance were still to be seen there, even though the land was now being used as a sawmill. The sawmill's storage yard, which had been laid out on the graveyard's former grounds, has for some years no longer existed. Three garages have since been built there.

=== Winegrowing ===
Monzingen's first documentary mention in AD 778 is bound with winegrowing. The document in question bears witness to a donation of vineyards to Lorsch Abbey, thus showing that the village has a long and successful winegrowing tradition. Even Johann Wolfgang von Goethe drank and praised Monzingen wine. At Saint Roch’s Festival at Bingen in 1815, he wrote:

Nahe Society is now vaunting a wine that grows in the area, called Monzinger. It should be lightly and enjoyably drunk up, though before one knows it, it can go to one’s head.

In Monzingen it is mainly the classic grape varieties that are grown, such as Riesling, Silvaner, Müller-Thurgau, Pinot blanc, Pinot gris, Bacchus and Dornfelder. Monzingen has the following Weingüter (wineries):

- Weingut Eckhard Alt
- Weingut Emrich-Schönleber
- Weingut Heinrich
- Weingut Jaeger
- Weingut E. Schauß & Sohn
- Weingut Axel Schramm
- Weingut Udo Weber

=== Clubs ===
The following clubs are active in Monzingen:

- Angelsportverein Nahemühle — angling club
- Bauern- und Winzerverband — farmers’ and winegrowers’ association
- CDU-Ortsverband Monzingen — Christian Democratic Union of Germany local chapter
- DRK Monzingen — German Red Cross local chapter
- FDP-Ortsverband Monzingen — Free Democratic Party local chapter
- Förderverein “Sanierung Evangelische Martinskirche Monzingen” — Saint Martin's Church restoration promotional association
- Förderverein Der Grundschule Monzingen — primary school promotional association
- Förderverein des Kindergartens — kindergarten promotional association
- Förderverein Freiwillige Feuerwehr Monzingen — fire brigade promotional association
- Förderverein TuS 04 Monzingen — gymnastic and sport club promotional association
- Freie Wählergemeinschaft Monzingen e.V. — Free Voters’ Association
- Freiwillige Feuerwehr Monzingen — volunteer fire brigade
- Freundeskreis Monzingen-Entrains — Monzingen-Entrains circle of friends
- Gesangverein Sängerlust Monzingen — singing club
- Hunsrückverein Monzingen — local history and geography club
- Landfrauen Monzingen — countrywomen's club
- Männergesangverein 1880 — men's singing club
- SPD-Ortsverein Monzingen — Social Democratic Party of Germany local chapter
- Sportfischerverein Monzingen — sport fishing club
- TuS 04 Monzingen — gymnastic and sport club
- Verkehrsverein Monzingen — transport club

== Economy and infrastructure ==
=== Transport ===
Running through Monzingen's south end is Bundesstraße 41, while Kreisstraße 19 and Landesstraße 229 pass through the village centre on their way to meet it. A short road, Kreisstraße 97, runs from that same interchange across the railway and the River Nahe to link the village with Landesstraße 232. Right near this main road junction is a railway station on the Nahe Valley Railway (Bingen–Saarbrücken).
