= Hochstetten-Dhaun =

- Municipality
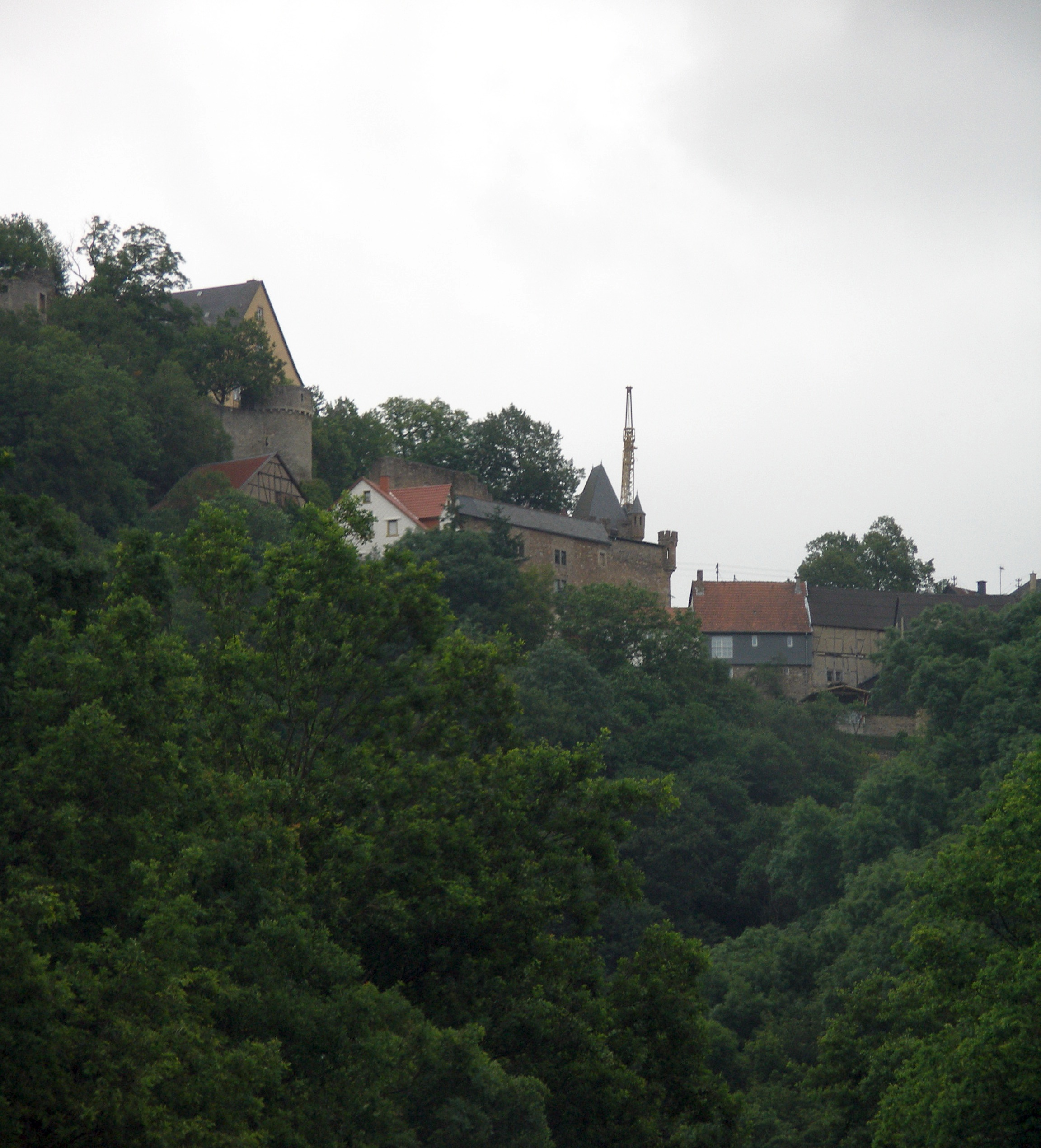
- Schloss Dhaun, view from the Kellenbach valley

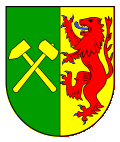
- Coat of arms

- Location of Hochstetten-Dhaun within Bad Kreuznach district
- Interactive map of Hochstetten-Dhaun
- Location within Germany Location within Rhineland-Palatinate
- Coordinates: 49°48′3″N 7°30′19″E
- Country: Germany
- State: Rhineland-Palatinate
- District: Bad Kreuznach
- Municipal assoc.: Kirner Land
- Subdivisions: 5

Government
  - Mayor (2019–24): Hans Helmut Döbell (SPD)

Area
  - Total: 12.61 km^{2} (4.87 sq mi)
- Elevation: 190 m (620 ft)

Population (2025-12-31)
  - Total: 1,668
  - Density: 132.3/km^{2} (342.6/sq mi)
- Time zone: UTC+01:00 (CET)
  - Summer (DST): UTC+02:00 (CEST)
- Postal codes: 55606
- Dialling codes: 06752
- Vehicle registration: KH

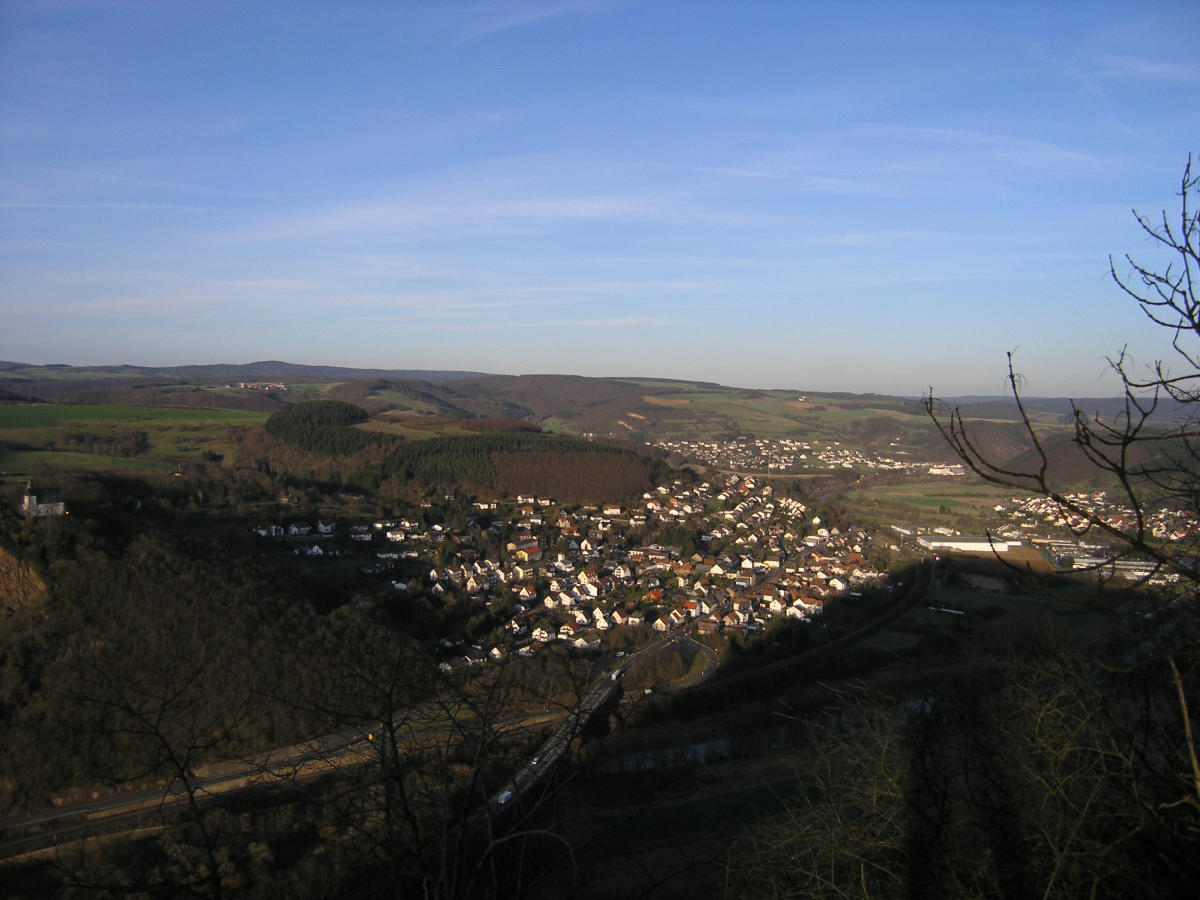
From left to right: St. Johannisberg, Hochstetten and Hochstädten

Hochstetten-Dhaun is an Ortsgemeinde – a municipality belonging to a Verbandsgemeinde, a kind of collective municipality – in the Bad Kreuznach district in Rhineland-Palatinate, Germany. It belongs to the Verbandsgemeinde Kirner Land, whose seat is in the town of Kirn. Hochstetten-Dhaun is a state-recognized recreational community.

== Geography ==
=== Location ===
Hochstetten-Dhaun lies in the Nahe valley between the Hunsrück to the north and the Palatinate to the south. By both land area and population, Hochstetten-Dhaun is the second biggest Ortsgemeinde in Kirn-Land.

=== Neighbouring municipalities ===
Clockwise from the north, Hochstetten-Dhaun's neighbours are the municipalities of Brauweiler, Simmertal, Merxheim and Meckenbach, the town of Kirn and the municipalities of Oberhausen bei Kirn and Heinzenberg, all of which likewise lie within the Bad Kreuznach district.

=== Constituent communities ===
Hochstetten-Dhaun's Ortsteile are Hochstetten (north of the Nahe) with the outlying hamlets and homesteads of Karlshof, St. Johannisberg, Waldeck and Waldhof (the Karlshof is one of the last of the old Dhaun estates on the heights north of the Nahe), Hochstädten (south of the Nahe), which until the late 18th century formed a single unit together with Hochstetten (the names are pronounced alike) and Schloss Dhaun, a castle and a hamlet, with the outlying homestead of Heinzenberger Gesellschaftsmühle.

== History ==
The great many barrows within Hochstetten-Dhaun's limits bear witness to settlers in the area even in prehistoric times. About 1100, Hochstetten/Hochstädten had its first documentary mention in a document from the Archbishopric of Mainz to Disibodenberg Abbey, which named a Ludovicus de Hosteden (“Ludwig/Louis of Hochstetten”), who donated holdings to the Abbey that he owned in Merxheim. The name prefix Hoch— seen in both “Hochstetten” and “Hochstädten” has nothing to do with those constituent communities’ geographical locations (hoch means “high” in German) for both Hochstetten and Hochstädten lie on rather low land down near the River Nahe. Far likelier is that the name is a corruption of what would be rendered Hofstätte in modern German, something with a perfectly transparent meaning, namely “estate place”. Clearly, this would describe a place where a landowner once held an estate. Nowadays, the two names Hochstetten and Hochstädten are pronounced alike, meaning that a distinction must be made in speech between them (to say nothing of Hochstätten, a self-administering municipality some 23 km to the east, also in the Bad Kreuznach district, and also with a name pronounced the same way). They did, however, once have official names that allowed easy distinction between the two. Hochstetten on the Nahe's left bank was known as Nächsthochstetten, whereas Hochstädten over on the right bank was known as Überhochstetten. These usages lasted centuries, and referred to the two centres’ positions relative to Castle Dhaun. Nächsthochstetten lay nearer the castle (its prefix means “next” or “nearest”), while Überhochstetten lay beyond it, across the river (its prefix means “across”, “over” or perhaps even “the one after the next”). Both villages were part of the Waldgravial-Rhinegravial Amt of Dhaun and formed the court district (Gericht) or Schultheißerei of Hochstetten. After the so-called “Dhaun Feud” (Dhauner Fehde) between Waldgrave Johann von Dhaun and Prince-Archbishop-Elector Baldwin of Trier had ended in defeat for the former, he had to cede his village in 1342 to the Electorate of Trier, whereupon Baldwin then enfeoffed the Waldgraves with the very holding that they had just forsaken, thus ensuring the Waldgraves’ allegiance to their former foe. The Counts of Veldenz, too, had certain landholds and rights that they had granted to vassals. In 1426, the Vogt Johann von Simmern held a half share in the village and court at Überhochstetten (Hochstädten) as a fief from the Waldgraves of Dhaun. In 1515, the Waldgravial Amt of Dhaun was made up of the castle, the village and the Vogtei of Simmern unter Dhaun, the villages of Nächsthochstetten and Überhochstetten and the Dhaun shares of Kirn, Bergen, Rhaunen and Hausen. In 1794, during the War of the First Coalition, French Revolutionary troops overran and occupied the German lands on the Rhine’s left bank, whereafter, in 1798, the region was administratively reorganized by the Directory according to the French Revolutionary model. The Nahe formed the boundary between two departments. The villages of Nächsthochstetten (Hochstetten) and Dhaun were grouped into the Mairie (“Mayoralty”) of Kirn, the Canton of Kirn, the Arrondissement of Simmern and the Department of Rhin-et-Moselle, whereas Überhochstetten – whose name was at this time changed to Hochstädten – belonged to the Mairie of Merxheim, the Canton of Meisenheim, the Arrondissement of Birkenfeld and the Department of Sarre. The Protestant parish of St. Johannisberg lost its autonomy and was made subject to the parish of Meckenbach. Once French rule had ended in the Rhineland in 1814, the Congress of Vienna awarded the region to the Kingdom of Prussia, which took possession of it in April 1815. The municipalities of Hochstetten and Dhaun passed in 1816 to the Bürgermeisterei (“Mayoralty”) of Kirn (later named the Amt of Kirn-Land in 1927) in the Kreuznach district in the Regierungsbezirk of Koblenz. The area south of the Nahe was ceded in 1816 to the Landgraves of Hesse-Homburg. Hochstädten became part of the Oberamt of Meisenheim, which existed until 1866, then being absorbed into the Prussian Meisenheim district. Hochstädten belonged to the Bürgermeisterei of Meddersheim (later named the Amt of Meddersheim in 1927). The Meisenheim district was merged into the Kreuznach district in 1932, thus ending the division of the three municipalities of Dhaun, Hochstädten and Hochstetten into different districts. After the Amt of Meddersheim was dissolved in 1940, Hochstädten likewise passed to the Amt of Kirn-Land, out of which today's Verbandsgemeinde of Kirn-Land was formed in 1968. Today's Ortsgemeinde of Hochstetten-Dhaun arose within the framework of municipal restructuring and administrative reform through a voluntary merger of the hitherto three self-administering municipalities of Dhaun (then with 208 inhabitants), Hochstädten (322) and Hochstetten bei Kirn (835) on 7 June 1969.

== Religion ==
As at 30 September 2013, there are 1,655 full-time residents in Hochstetten-Dhaun, and of those, 1,062 are Evangelical (64.169%), 314 are Catholic (18.973%), 1 is Greek Orthodox (0.06%), 1 is Lutheran (0.06%), 1 is Russian Orthodox (0.06%), 37 (2.236%) belong to other religious groups and 239 (14.441%) either have no religion or will not reveal their religious affiliation.

== Politics ==
=== Municipal council ===
The council is made up of 16 council members, who were elected by proportional representation at the municipal election held on 7 June 2009, and the honorary mayor as chairman. The municipal election held on 7 June 2009 yielded the following results:

Year	SPD	CDU	FWG	Total
2009	10	2	4	16 seats
2004	7	2	7	16 seats

=== Mayor ===
Hochstetten-Dhaun's mayor is Hans Helmut Döbell (SPD).

=== Coat of arms ===
The German blazon reads: Schild gespalten, vorne in Grün zwei goldene gekreuzte Hämmer, hinten in Gold ein roter blaubewehrter und -gezungter Löwe.

The municipality's arms might in English heraldic language be described thus: Per pale vert a hammer and pick per saltire Or and Or a lion rampant gules armed and langued azure.

The charge on the dexter (armsbearer's right, viewer's left) side, the hammer and pick, is the mark of the stone industry in the municipality. The charge on the sinister (armsbearer's left, viewer's right) side, the lion, is a reference to the village's former allegiance to the Waldgraviate-Rhinegraviate. Before their dissolution on 6 June 1969, the former municipalities of Dhaun, Hochstädten and Hochstetten bei Kirn bore their own arms. The council of the newly formed municipality of Hochstetten-Dhaun decided on 8 August 1969 to bear Hochstetten's former arms as the new municipality's heraldic emblem. At a Hochstetten council meeting on 6 July 1964, council had adopted the design that had been put forth by the graphic artist Brust from Kirn-Sulzbach. The Ministry of the Interior in Mainz had then granted approval for Hochstetten to bear its own arms on 15 February 1965. The approval for Hochstetten-Dhaun to bear these same arms was granted on 2 October 1969. The municipal banner also bears this coat of arms in the centre.

== Culture and sightseeing ==
=== Buildings ===
The following are listed buildings or sites in Rhineland-Palatinate’s Directory of Cultural Monuments:

==== Hochstädten ====
- Evangelical church, Kirchstraße 3 – sandstone-block building, Rundbogen framing, marked 1866/1867
- At Hauptstraße 39 – Renaissance portal with skylight, about 1600
- At Hauptstraße 41 – Renaissance portal, marked 1567

==== Hochstetten ====
- Evangelical church, Brunnengasse – sandstone-block building, 1864

==== Schloß Dhaun ====
- Evangelical church, Kirner Straße 12 – former comital brewing house, essentially Baroque, 18th century, given Classicist makeover in the early 19th century
- Castle (monumental zone) – mentioned in 1215 as a castle, expanded in 1729 into a residential castle, torn down in 1804 and years that followed, conversion of outer bailey into an English garden; inner ward complex, ruin of Saint George’s Chapel (Georgskapelle; 1608), upper gateway (1526), north wing (1729, expansion in 1971–1977); reconstructed and altered great hall; two gun turrets; on the ward wall an heraldic lion, 18th century
- Im Hahn – village fountain, hewn stone, 17th or 18th century
- Im Hahn 1 – Baroque house with single roof ridge, partly slated, 18th century
- Im Hahn 17 – Late Baroque timber-frame bungalow, marked 1776
- Kirner Straße (no number) – communal bakehouse; possibly from the latter half of the 19th century
- Kirner Straße 2 – Baroque building with half-hip roof, marked 1731; set at a corner across from the castle gateway
- Neuweg 13 – former Amtshaus (Amt seat); Baroque building with mansard roof, 1738

==== St. Johannisberg ====
- St. Johannisberg – Evangelical parish church; formerly Saint John the Baptist’s Collegiate Church (Stiftskirche St. Johannes der Täufer), Gothic aisleless church, 1318, tower 1465, quire 1595; old churchyard wall with gateway arch
- Village core (monumental zone), St. Johannisberg 11, 13 among others – former collegiate church with churchyard, former Protestant rectory from 1743, village inn and farmhouse across the street, essentially Baroque as well as an estate complex along the street, no. 11, abutting the churchyard; in the middle of the street a well; bakehouse, possibly from the latter half of the 19th century
- On Kreisstraße 10 north of the church – bakehouse, possibly from the latter half of the 19th century
- St. Johannisberg 13 – former Evangelical rectory; Baroque solid building in style of house with single roof ridge, marked 1743

=== More about the castle ===
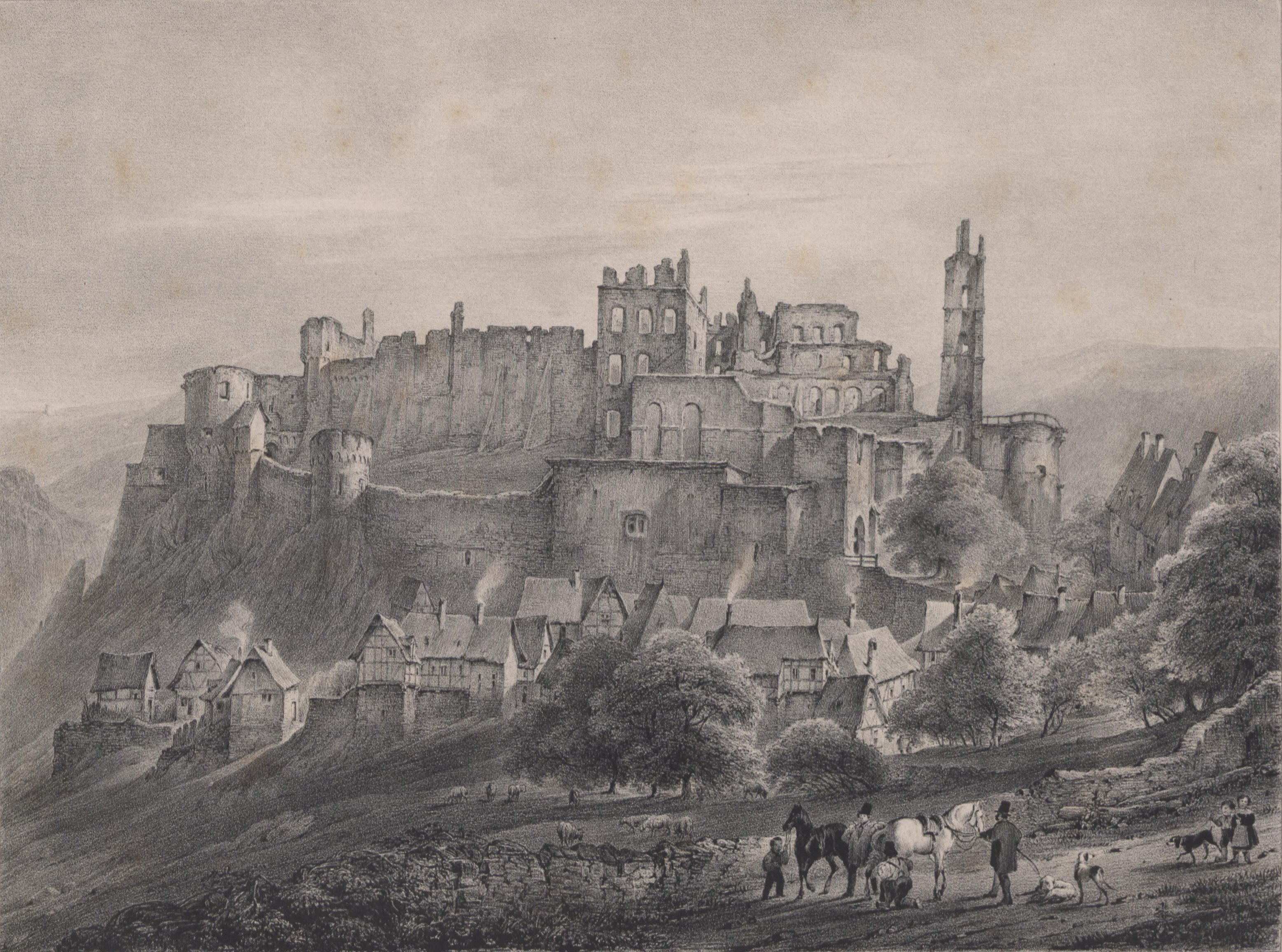
The castle ruin in an engraving by Caspar Scheuren, 1834

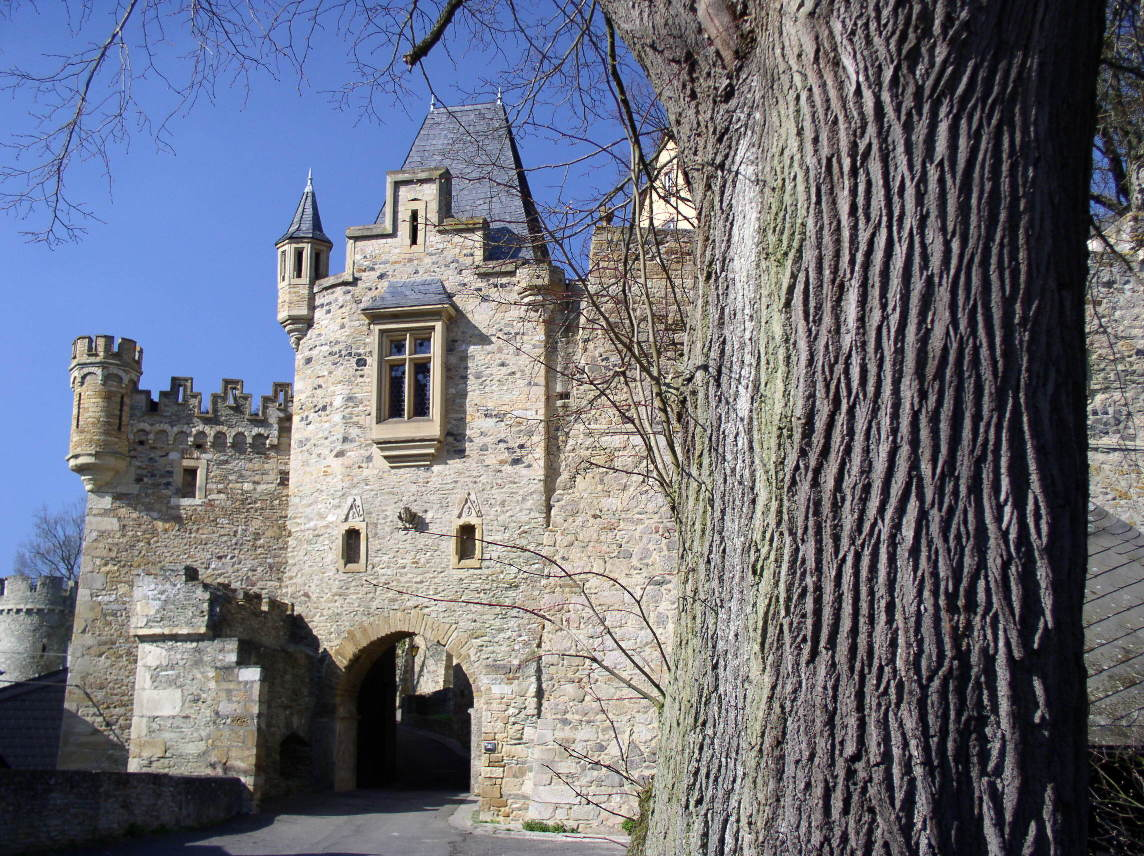
Entrance portal from 1850

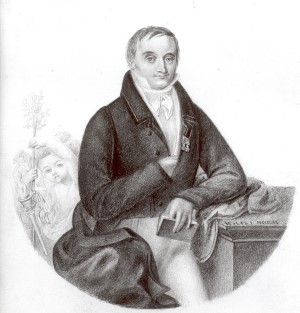
The buyer: Andreas van Recum (1765-1828)

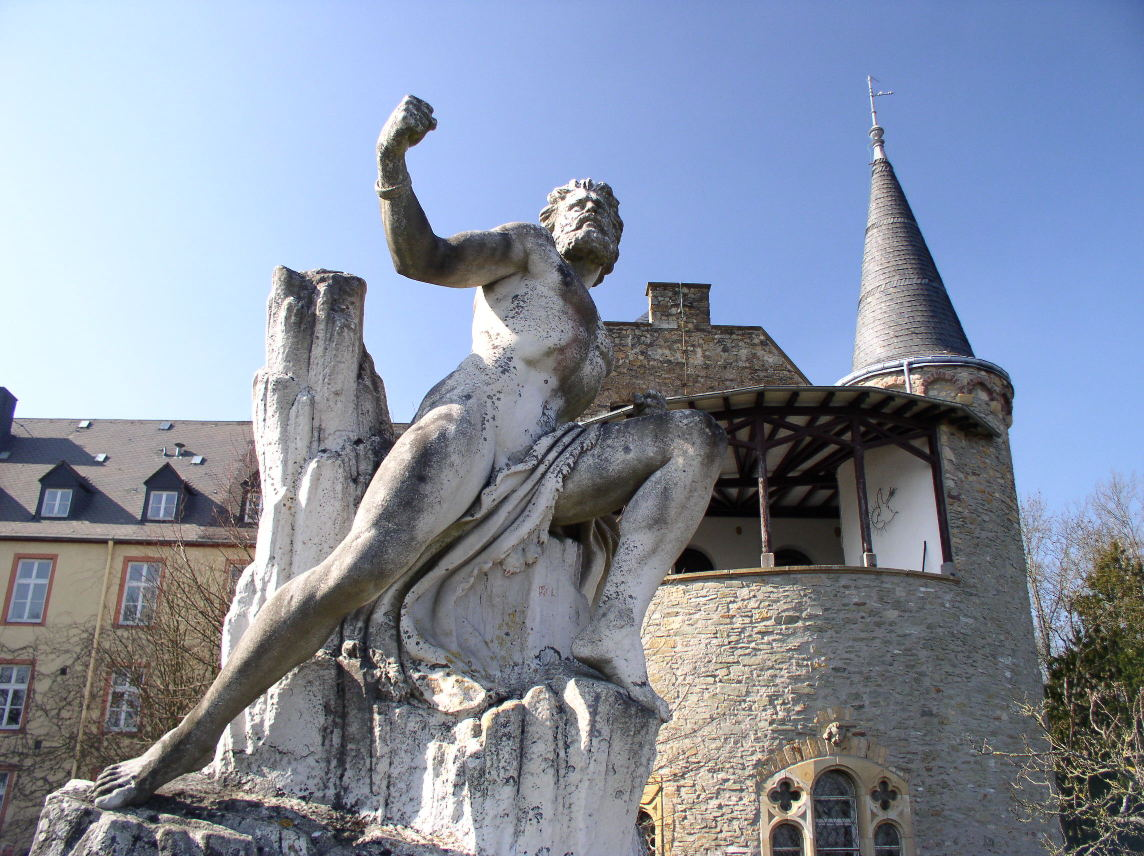
Prometheus in the Schlosspark

Schloss Dhaun is a castle ruin in the Hunsrück within Hochstetten-Dhaun’s municipal limits. The castle and the like-named constituent community lie high above the Kellenbach valley. It is said to be the biggest complex of its kind in the Nahe valley. Built in the 12th century as a defensive fortification (a Burg or "castle" rather than a Schloss or "stately home") by the Counts of the Nahegau, it had its first documentary mention in 1215 as castrum de Dune (“the castle on the heights”) and was then a fief of Saint Maximin's Abbey in Trier. In the Middle Ages, the complex protected the territory held by the Waldgraves, who were the Nahegau counts’ successors. In 1340, during the so-called “Dhaun Feud” (Dhauner Fehde), the castle was besieged by Prince-Archbishop-Elector of Trier Baldwin's troops. Baldwin was at odds with the lord of the castle, Johann I of Dhaun, over the Schmidtburg. The Prince-Archbishop-Elector prevailed in the siege, and Johann eventually had to grant him the unhindered use of the castle in times of war or feud (an arrangement called Öffnungsrecht in German history). In connection with the Dhaun Feud, a whole ring of castles sprang up, among them Castle Brunkenstein (actually the addition of an outer bailey), Castle Rotenberg, Castle Martinstein, the siege position of Geiersley and the castle on the Johannisberg (mountain). Johann I died in 1350 without a male heir, and therefore the complex passed to his nephew, Rhinegrave Johann II of Stein, Johann's sister Hedwig's son. With him began the long era of the Waldgraves and Rhinegraves of Dhaun. In the 15th and 16th centuries, the castle was further expanded and fortified. It is from that time that the barbican at the upper bailey comes. This was built in 1526. The three-level network of underground passageways and rooms was also built in these centuries. The passageways emerge from the ground at an exit at the foot of the castle, into its neck ditch. Finished in 1729 was the remodelling of the castle, such as it had become by then, into a residential castle – a Schloss – under Waldgrave and Rhinegrave Karl von Dhaun and his wife Luise, born Countess of Nassau-Saarbrücken. The palas in the west was converted into a palatial dwelling, and onto its south side was built a wing several floors tall. Together with a somewhat older building to the north, the whole complex thereby took on a horseshoe-shaped footprint. The land around the upper bailey became the Schloss garden with a carriage house. Count Karl did not, however, get much time to enjoy his converted castle home, for only four years after work was finished, he died in 1733. One year later, the Schloss was threatened with destruction during the War of the Polish Succession, a fate then already suffered by the neighbouring Castle Kyrburg. Count Karl's widow, though, somehow managed to keep this from happening. In 1794, French Revolutionary troops conquered the Nahe region and thereby also Schloss Dhaun. It was taken into state ownership and its remnants were auctioned in 1804 with a view to carting the stone off for other purposes. The buyer, who paid 1,200 francs for it, was Andreas van Recum, a high official in the French administration, the sous-préfet in the Arrondissement of Simmern. He had all usable parts of the building complex taken to the Kauzenburg (another castle) in Bad Kreuznach. An end was put to the ruin's inexorable crumbling only in the 19th century when in 1850 a physician from Trier acquired part of the complex and began with work to reinstate some of the castle's former glory, but with a somewhat Romanticized vision of what a castle should look like, which had rather little to do with the former mediaeval reality. It is from this time that the building elements at the castle's entrance gate date. Further changes in ownership followed until at the turn of the 20th century, a manufacturer from Kirn named Simon acquired Schloss Dhaun and undertook various new building projects and renovations on the upper bailey. It was he who had the new great hall on the ruin of the north wing, using parts of the building that still stood. The old entrance and the 16th-century builder's family coat of arms can still be made out. The Simons also acquired the Prometheus figure, created by the sculptor from Kreuznach, Robert Cauer the Elder, in Rome in 1888. In 1954, the Schloss was transferred to the Zweckverband Schloss Dhaun (a Zweckverband is an intercommunal association with the goal of undertaking an important public work) comprising the town of Kirn, the then Amt of Kirn-Land and the Bad Kreuznach district. It still owns the Schloss today. Preserved at this mediaeval castle complex now in the area of the upper bailey are ruins of Saint George’s Chapel (St.-Georgskapelle), consecrated in 1661 and the kitchen building as well as two bastions and the girding wall with defensive towers and a gatehouse. In the west wing, the former palas, the entrance portal is preserved. The building was reconstructed by the Zweckverband, and since 1957 it has housed the Heim-Volkshochschule Schloss Dhaun, a training centre for youths and adults whose scholastic head for many years was the historian Werner Vogt. Also housed at the Schloss since 1991 has been the Kommunalakademie Rheinland-Pfalz, also an educational institution. At the lower bailey, the Bad Kreuznach district maintains at the site of the watchtower a youth training centre, and the great hall is available for celebrations.

=== Clubs ===
The following clubs are active in Hochstetten-Dhaun:

- Angelverein 1974 e.V. — angling club
- Evangelische Frauenhilfe — Evangelical women’s aid
- Förderverein Freiwillige Feuerwehr — volunteer fire brigade promotional association
- Förderverein Kindergarten — kindergarten promotional association
- Förderverein Stiftkirche St. Johannisberg e.V. — Saint John the Baptist’s Collegiate Church promotional association
- Freie Wählergemeinschaft — Free Voters association
- Heimvolkshochschule Schloss Dhaun e.V. — folk high school
- Jagdhornbläsergruppe Hellberg-Kirn — hunting horn blowers’ group
- Jugendgruppe Hochstetten e.V. “Am Hammer” — youth group
- Kirchenchor St. Johannisberg — church choir
- Landfrauenverein Hochstetten — countrywomen's club
- MGV Hochstädten 1900 — men's singing club
- Musik- und Unterhaltungsverein 1951 Hochstetten e.V. — music and conversation club
- Musikverein Schloss Dhaun — music club
- Seifenkisten-Club — soapbox club
- Senioren 55+ — seniors’ club
- Spielvereinigung Hochstetten 1916 — sporting union
- Turnverein 07 Hochstetten e.V. — gymnastic club
- TV Schloss Dhaun — gymnastic club
- VdK Ortsverband — social advocacy group local chapter
- Wanderfrauen — women's hiking club

== Economy and infrastructure ==
=== Transport ===
Running through Hochstetten-Dhaun is Bundesstraße 41, off which branches Bundesstraße 421 just northeast of the municipality at Simmertal. Bundesstraße 41 thence leads westwards to Bad Sobernheim, Bad Kreuznach and eventually Ingelheim am Rhein. At Bad Kreuznach is an interchange onto Autobahn A 61 (Koblenz–Ludwigshafen), while Autobahn A 60, running into Mainz, can be reached through another interchange at Ingelheim. Southwest of Hochstetten-Dhaun, Bundesstraße 41 leads to Idar-Oberstein, Birkenfeld, Nohfelden and Sankt Wendel. Serving Hochstetten-Dhaun's constituent community of Hochstetten is a railway station on the Nahe Valley Railway (Bingen–Saarbrücken).

== Further reading (about the castle) ==
These works are all in German:

- Alexander Thon, Stefan Ulrich, Achim Wendt: „… wo trotzig noch ein mächtiger Thurm herabschaut“. Burgen im Hunsrück und an der Nahe. Schnell & Steiner, Regensburg 2013, ISBN 978-3-7954-2493-0, S. 46–51.
- Hugo Fröhlich, Walther Zimmermann: Schloss Dhaun. Ein Führer. [Dhaun]: 1957.
- J. F. Röhrig: Schloss Dhaun. Ein Führer für den Besuch seiner Ruinen. Mendel, Kirn 1906.
