= Martinstein =

- Municipality
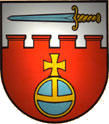
- Coat of arms

- Location of Martinstein within Bad Kreuznach district
- Interactive map of Martinstein
- Location within Germany Location within Rhineland-Palatinate
- Coordinates: 49°48′14″N 7°32′28″E
- Country: Germany
- State: Rhineland-Palatinate
- District: Bad Kreuznach
- Municipal assoc.: Nahe-Glan

Government
  - Mayor (2019–24): Paul-Walter Bock

Area
  - Total: 0.39 km^{2} (0.15 sq mi)
- Elevation: 190 m (620 ft)

Population (2025-12-31)
  - Total: 274
  - Density: 700/km^{2} (1,800/sq mi)
- Time zone: UTC+01:00 (CET)
  - Summer (DST): UTC+02:00 (CEST)
- Postal codes: 55627
- Dialling codes: 06754
- Vehicle registration: KH

Martinstein is an Ortsgemeinde – a municipality belonging to a Verbandsgemeinde, a kind of collective municipality – in the Bad Kreuznach district in Rhineland-Palatinate, Germany. It belongs to the Verbandsgemeinde Nahe-Glan. Martinstein is a state-recognized tourism resort, and with an area of 39 ha is Germany's smallest municipality by land area.

== Geography ==
=== Location ===
Martinstein lies right on the River Nahe’s left bank. Looming to the north is the Hunsrück, and to the south the North Palatine Uplands.

=== Neighbouring municipalities ===
Clockwise from the north, Martinstein's neighbours are the municipalities of Simmertal, Weiler bei Monzingen and Merxheim, all of which likewise lie within the Bad Kreuznach district.

== History ==
At a narrowing in the Nahe valley and an old river crossing, a small settlement arose in the High Middle Ages within the greater municipal area of Simmern unter Dhaun (nowadays called Simmertal). It was, however, 1518 before this village was given its own municipal area, now the smallest in Germany. In 1340, Archbishop Heinrich of Mainz built a small castle over the village in his feud with the Waldgrave of Dhaun. It was even granted town rights in 1342. Martinstein formed along with Seesbach and Weiler its own lordly domain, which in 1359 the Archbishop of Mainz pledged to the Knight of Grasewege (Sobernheim). For 1,800 Rhenish guilders, he was to expand the facilities. As early as 1347, the Counts of Sponheim had been the pledgeholders, and by 1389 it was the Knights of Merxheim, who in turn were followed by yet other lords. The village belonged in the Middle Ages to the Mainz cathedral provost's archdeaconry and thereby also to the Glan Archipresbyterium. Martinstein was, however, assigned in 1560 to the rural chapter of Glan, as was Simmern (Simmertal). Although the Lutheran faith was introduced in 1550 by the then village lords, a new Catholic parish arose as early as 1660. About 1555, great parts of the village belonged to the Knights of Hunolstein and the Lords of Sickingen. In 1660, the House of Leyen and the House of Ebersberg, called Weyers-Leyen, were landholders. The pledgings ended in 1655 when Archbishop Johann Philipp of Mainz of the House of Schönborn redeemed them and transferred the lordly rights to his family. They then built a small palatial residence on the site of the old castle, which by now had fallen into disrepair. The residence itself then stood until 1780, when it in turn had to be torn down. In 1620, during the Thirty Years' War, the residence was taken by the Spaniards, whose general, Marquis Ambrogio Spinola (1569–1630), mentioned the house in his despatch and even had a drawing of it made. In 1716, the Margraves of Baden bought all the lordly rights held by the Knights of Schönborn, doing the same with the Ebersberg holdings in 1779 and assigning all to the Badish Amt of Naumburg. Nevertheless, the Revolutionary French swept all these lordships away once they had overrun the Rhineland, and they then imposed their own administrative system based on the French Revolutionary model. Martinstein was grouped into the Mairie (“Mayoralty”) of Monzingen, which subsequently remained in force as the Bürgermeisterei (also “Mayoralty”) of Monzingen once Napoleonic times were over and the village had passed under the terms of the Congress of Vienna to the Kingdom of Prussia. In 1850, the stone bridge across the River Nahe was built. About 1953, Bundesstraße 41, which led through the village, had to be widened, a job that led to the disappearance of several old houses, changing the village's appearance utterly. Until 1966, parts of Martinstein's built-up area lay within neighbouring Simmern unter Dhaun's, Weiler's or Merxheim's limits. The municipal limits have since been adjusted to put the whole village under one municipal administration, rather than four separate ones. Nevertheless, Martinstein is still Germany's smallest municipality by area. In the course of administrative restructuring in Rhineland-Palatinate, Martinstein was assigned in 1970 to the Verbandsgemeinde of Bad Sobernheim.

=== Jewish history ===
Before the Nazi era, a few Jewish families lived in Martinstein, but it is believed that they attended synagogue in neighbouring Simmertal (then known as Simmern unter Dhaun). The Martinstein Jews also buried their dead in Simmertal. According to the Gedenkbuch – Opfer der Verfolgung der Juden unter der nationalsozialistischen Gewaltherrschaft in Deutschland 1933-1945 ("Memorial Book – Victims of the Persecution of the Jews under National Socialist Tyranny") and Yad Vashem, of all Jews who either were born in Martinstein or lived there for a long time, two were killed under Nazi persecution (birthdates in brackets):

1. Amalie Heidt née Stern (1896)
2. Isidore Strauss (1891)

=== Population development ===
Martinstein's population development since Napoleonic times is shown in the table below. The figures for the years from 1871 to 1987 are drawn from census data:

Year	Inhabitants
1815	132
1835	202
1871	188
1905	194
1939	295

Year	Inhabitants
1950	345
1961	367
1970	368
1987	351
2005	341

== Religion ==
As at 31 October 2013, there are 274 full-time residents in Martinstein, and of those, 131 are Evangelical (47.81%), 80 are Catholic (29.197%), 1 is Lutheran (0.365%), 19 (6.934%) belong to other religious groups and 43 (15.693%) either have no religion or will not reveal their religious affiliation.

== Politics ==
=== Municipal council ===
The council is made up of 8 council members, who were elected by majority vote at the municipal election held on 7 June 2009, and the honorary mayor as chairman.

=== Mayor ===
Martinstein's mayor is Paul-Walter Bock.

=== Coat of arms ===
The German blazon reads: Von silbernem Schildhaupt, darin ein blaues Schwert, durch Zinnenschnitt mit vier Zinnen geteilt, unten in Rot ein blauer Reichsapfel, gold gerandet mit goldenem Tatzenkreuz.

The municipality's arms might in English heraldic language be described thus: Gules an Imperial orb azure encircled Or and ensigned with a cross pattée of the same, on a chief embattled of four argent a sword of the second hilted and pommelled of the third.

In 1340, Archbishops Heinrich of Mainz and Baldwin of Trier built a castle as a defence against Waldgrave Johann of Dhaun, to put the Nahe valley off limits to him. This stronghold was called the “Martinstein”. The battlements at the line of partition between the chief and the main field symbolize this castle. The tinctures gules and argent (red and silver) are also Electoral Mainz's and Electoral Palatinate’s colours. The charge on the chief, the sword, is Saint Martin’s attribute. He is the municipality’s patron and namesake. The number of merlons in the crenellations is specifically four, as prescribed in the blazon (“Zinnenschnitt mit vier Zinnen”/“embattled of four”), to stand for the four Ortsteile (constituent communities) into which the municipality was subdivided until 1967. The charge in the main field, the globus cruciger (“orb” in heraldry; Reichsapfel, meaning “Imperial Apple”, in German), stands as a symbol of the local Martinstein lordship's Imperial-knightly status during feudal times.

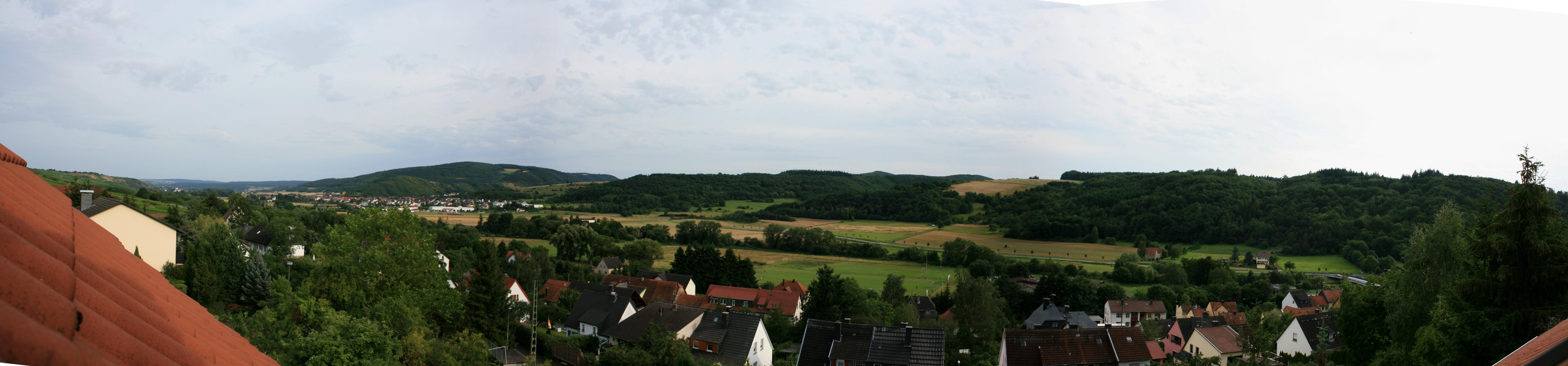
Panorama of Martinstein

== Culture and sightseeing ==
=== Buildings ===
The following are listed buildings or sites in Rhineland-Palatinate’s Directory of Cultural Monuments:

- Saint Martin's Catholic Church (Kirche St. Martin), Hauptstraße 9 – Gothic quire, 14th century, Baroque nave, marked 1729; in the walled churchyard gravestones, about 1765, Baroque priest's gravestone, 18th century; pedestal of a Late Baroque Crucifix
- Hauptstraße 40 – former school; two-winged complex, buildings with half-hip roofs, partly decorative timber-frame, Heimatstil, marked 1903

== Economy and infrastructure ==
=== Transport ===
Running right through the village is Bundesstraße 41. Serving Martinstein is a railway station (actually a closed station whose platform is nonetheless still used as a halt) on the Nahe Valley Railway (Bingen–Saarbrücken).

=== Established businesses ===
Martinstein has a hotel with a restaurant and a ninepin alley. There are also an ice cream parlour, a bakery, a housewares shop, a tile-laying shop and a graphic art shop.
