= Entrains-sur-Nohain =

- Commune
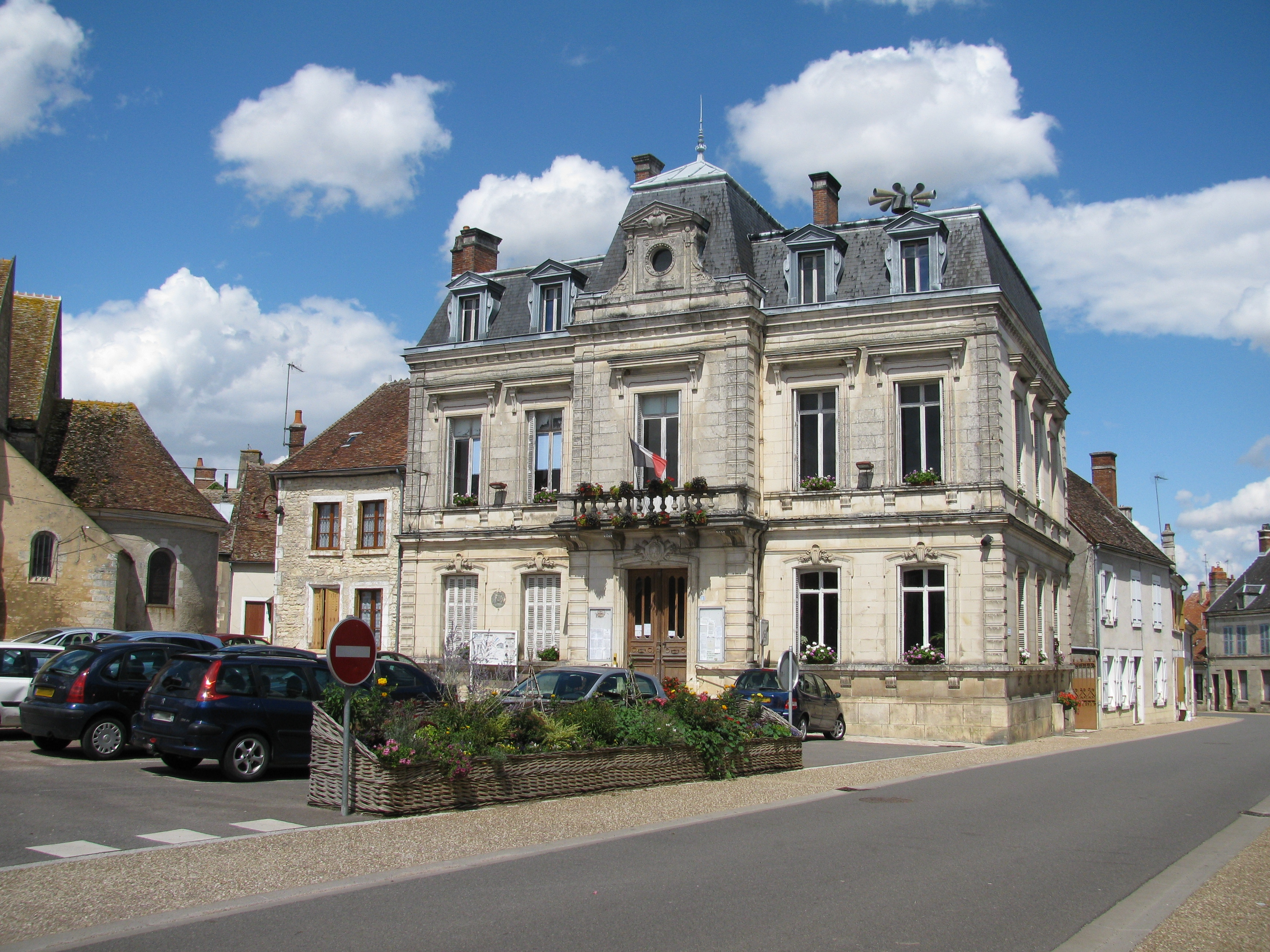
- The town hall in Entrains

- Coat of arms
- Location of Entrains-sur-Nohain
- Location within France Location within Bourgogne-Franche-Comté
- Coordinates: 47°27′54″N 3°15′25″E
- Country: France
- Region: Bourgogne-Franche-Comté
- Department: Nièvre
- Arrondissement: Clamecy
- Canton: Clamecy

Government
  - Mayor (2020–2026): Michel Poirier
- Area^{1}: 58.73 km^{2} (22.68 sq mi)
- Highest elevation: 332 m (1,089 ft)
- Lowest elevation: 210 m (690 ft)
- Population (2023): 740
  - Density: 13/km^{2} (33/sq mi)
- Time zone: UTC+01:00 (CET)
  - Summer (DST): UTC+02:00 (CEST)
- INSEE/Postal code: 58109 /58410
- ^{1} French Land Register data, which excludes lakes, ponds, glaciers > 1 km^{2} (0.386 sq mi or 247 acres) and river estuaries.

Entrains-sur-Nohain (French pronunciation: [ɑ̃tʁɛ̃ syʁ nɔ.ɛ̃]) is a commune in the Nièvre department in central France.

== Sister cities ==
Entrains fosters partnerships with the following places:

- Saranac Lake, New York, United States
- Monzingen, Rhineland-Palatinate, Germany

== See also ==
- Communes of the Nièvre department
