= Seesbach =

- Municipality
- Coat of arms

- Location of Seesbach within Bad Kreuznach district
- Interactive map of Seesbach
- Location within Germany Location within Rhineland-Palatinate
- Coordinates: 49°50′53″N 7°32′44″E
- Country: Germany
- State: Rhineland-Palatinate
- District: Bad Kreuznach
- Municipal assoc.: Nahe-Glan

Government
  - Mayor (2019–24): Ernst-Rainer Altmeier

Area
  - Total: 6.06 km^{2} (2.34 sq mi)
- Elevation: 375 m (1,230 ft)

Population (2025-12-31)
  - Total: 498
  - Density: 82.2/km^{2} (213/sq mi)
- Time zone: UTC+01:00 (CET)
  - Summer (DST): UTC+02:00 (CEST)
- Postal codes: 55629
- Dialling codes: 06754
- Vehicle registration: KH
- Website: www.seesbach.de

Seesbach is a municipality in the district of Bad Kreuznach in Rhineland-Palatinate, in western Germany.

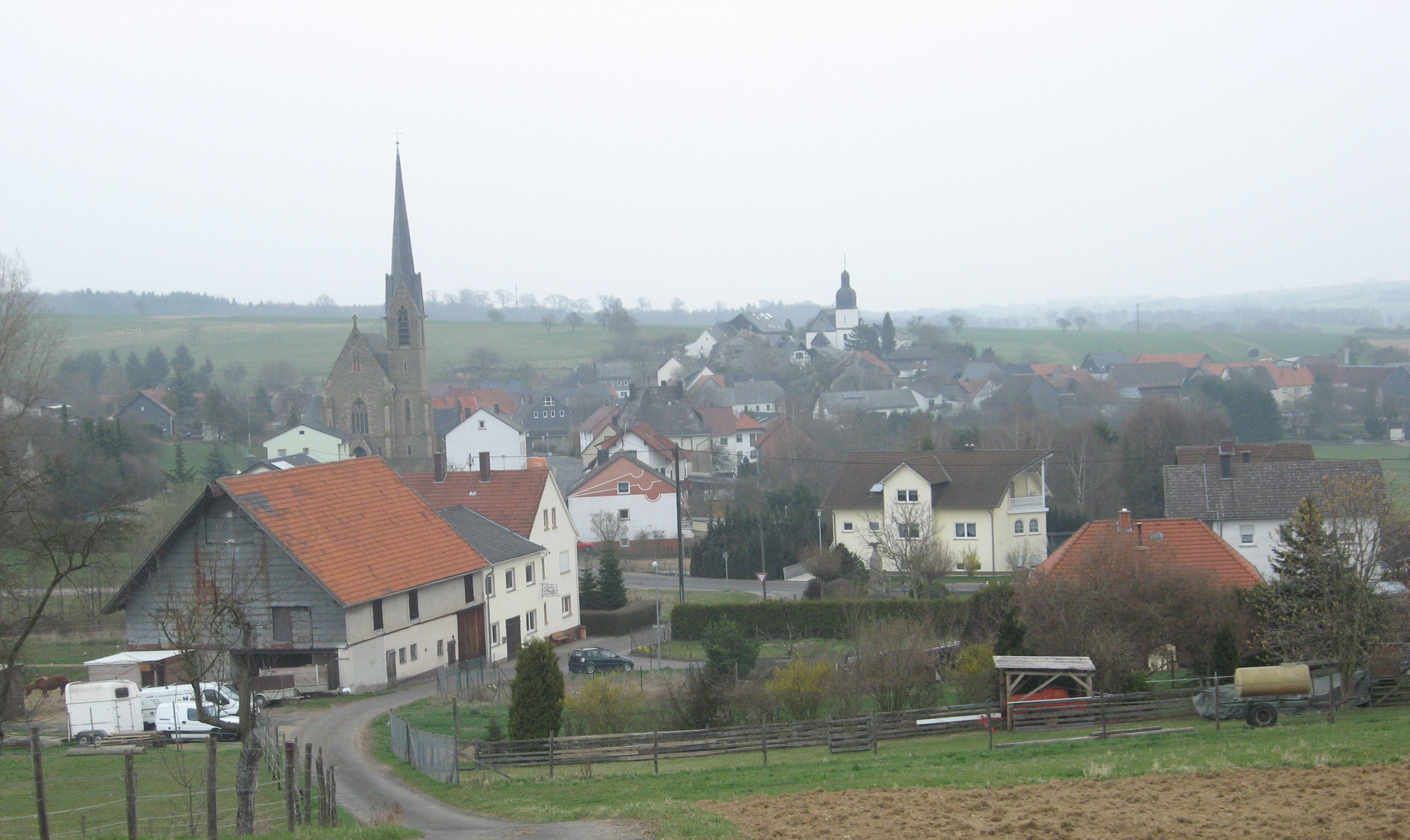
Seesbach
