= Simmertal =

- Municipality
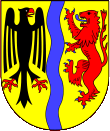
- Coat of arms

- Location of Simmertal within Bad Kreuznach district
- Interactive map of Simmertal
- Location within Germany Location within Rhineland-Palatinate
- Coordinates: 49°48′38.45″N 7°31′14.68″E
- Country: Germany
- State: Rhineland-Palatinate
- District: Bad Kreuznach
- Municipal assoc.: Kirner Land

Government
  - Mayor (2019–24): Christina Bleisinger (SPD)

Area
  - Total: 8.08 km^{2} (3.12 sq mi)
- Elevation: 190–432 m (623–1,417 ft)

Population (2025-12-31)
  - Total: 1,856
  - Density: 230/km^{2} (595/sq mi)
- Time zone: UTC+01:00 (CET)
  - Summer (DST): UTC+02:00 (CEST)
- Postal codes: 55618
- Dialling codes: 06754
- Vehicle registration: KH
- Website: www.simmertal.de

Simmertal is a municipality in the district of Bad Kreuznach in Rhineland-Palatinate, in western Germany.
