= Weiler bei Monzingen =

- Municipality
- Coat of arms

- Location of Weiler bei Monzingen within Bad Kreuznach district
- Interactive map of Weiler bei Monzingen
- Location within Germany Location within Rhineland-Palatinate
- Coordinates: 49°48′38″N 7°33′43″E
- Country: Germany
- State: Rhineland-Palatinate
- District: Bad Kreuznach
- Municipal assoc.: Nahe-Glan

Government
  - Mayor (2019–24): Daniela Bohl-Veldenzer

Area
  - Total: 5.87 km^{2} (2.27 sq mi)
- Elevation: 210 m (690 ft)

Population (2025-12-31)
  - Total: 448
  - Density: 76.3/km^{2} (198/sq mi)
- Time zone: UTC+01:00 (CET)
  - Summer (DST): UTC+02:00 (CEST)
- Postal codes: 55627
- Dialling codes: 06754
- Vehicle registration: KH

Weiler bei Monzingen is a municipality in the district of Bad Kreuznach in Rhineland-Palatinate, in western Germany.
