= Loretta of Sponheim =

German countess

Loretta of Sponheim (born ca. 1300; died 1346) was a German noblewoman. She was regent of the German County of Sponheim on behalf of her son, Count John III, during his minority from 1324 to 1331.

== Biography ==
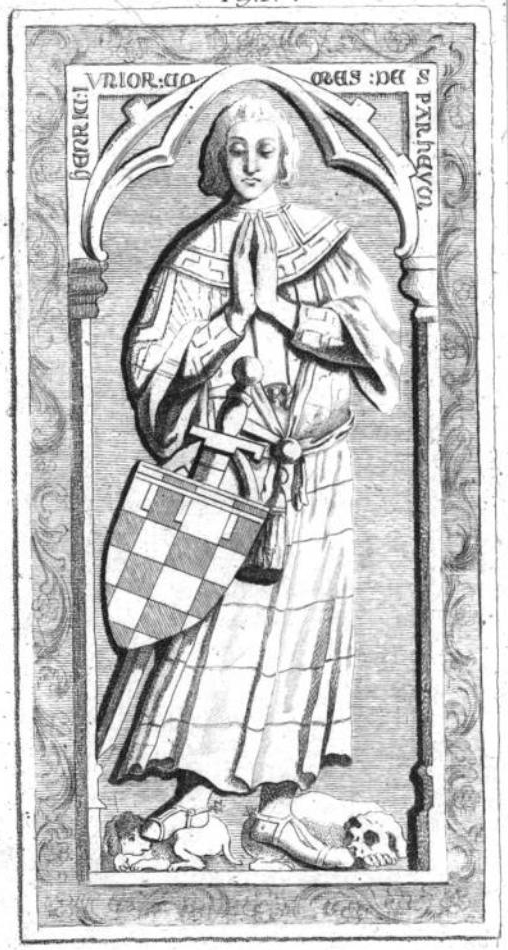
Tomb sculpture of Loretta's husband. The inscription reads "HENRIC:IVNIOR:COMES:DE: SPANHEIM" (Latin: Henry, the younger Count of Spanheim). "Spanheim" is an older form of "Sponheim."

Loretta was born in the Vosges ca. 1300 to John I of (Upper) Salm and Jeanne of Joinville, the daughter of the Seigneur Geoffrey de Geneville, and was raised speaking both German and French. In 1315 Loretta was betrothed to Henry II, Count of Sponheim-Starkenburg. In the course of their eight-year-long marriage she gave birth to three sons. After the death of her husband of an illness in 1323, she changed her residence from Wolfstein on the River Lauter to Starkenburg on the Moselle.

=== Regent ===
Her father-in-law, John II, died in 1324, so that the young widow thenceforward had to direct the destinies of the county as regent for her son John throughout an exceedingly difficult time, both politically and economically.

Widespread poverty and the scarcity of currency set great problems for the young widow in a period marked by territorial conflicts, crop failures, and desertion to the cities by the peasantry. In this unpromising position Loretta was forced to engage in a trial of strength with one of the most powerful and influential princes of her time, the Elector Baldwin of Luxembourg, Archbishop of Trier (1285–1354), the brother of the Holy Roman Emperor Henry VII.

The stage was set when in 1327 Loretta engaged upon a feud with the stubborn Frederick, Wildgrave of Kyrburg (1298-1367), who disputed her rights to the fees paid by those serfs of the Sponheims who dwelt in Wörresbach in the wildgraves' demesne. Loretta had Frederick and his son Godfrey straightway seized and imprisoned in Castle Starkenburg (Burgruine), until they submitted to her demand that the dispute be subject to arbitration by representatives of the most important lords of the region, limiting the influence of the wildgraves and strengthening the rights of the Sponheims over the disputed territory.

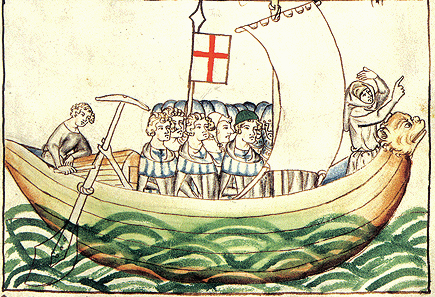
Baldwin of Luxemburg on a trip down the Moselle. From the Codex Balduini, 1341.

In May 1328, despite a declared armistice, Loretta undertook an even more drastic action: as the unsuspecting Elector was passing Starkenburg on a voyage down the Moselle to Koblenz, his cog was stopped by a chain drawn across the river and surrounded by boats filled with her troops, who conveyed him to a dignified captivity in the reputedly impregnable castle. Despite the excommunication she incurred for an attack on a churchman, with its associated political and social sanctions, Loretta held the Archbishop and, by means of skillful negotiation, forced concessions from him, including a ransom, the yielding of his claims to certain parts of her son’s territories, and his personal intercession with Pope John XXII for the lifting of her excommunication.

Thereafter Loretta devoted herself to putting Sponheim on a firm political and economic footing. It is a measure of the skill of the Countess’s diplomacy that when she found it necessary to borrow certain monies, the surety for the loan was none other than her old rival, Baldwin of Luxembourg.

In 1331, her regency over the county of Sponheim ended with the accession of her son as John III of Sponheim-Starkenburg.

=== Later life ===
Toward the end of her life the Countess busied herself with the construction of the Frauenburg (German: Lady-Castle), after which the current municipality of Frauenberg [sic] is named; according to legend, the castle was built principally using the ransom she had received from Baldwin’s kidnapping. Loretta died in 1346 and was interred in the Cistercian Abbey of Himmerod.

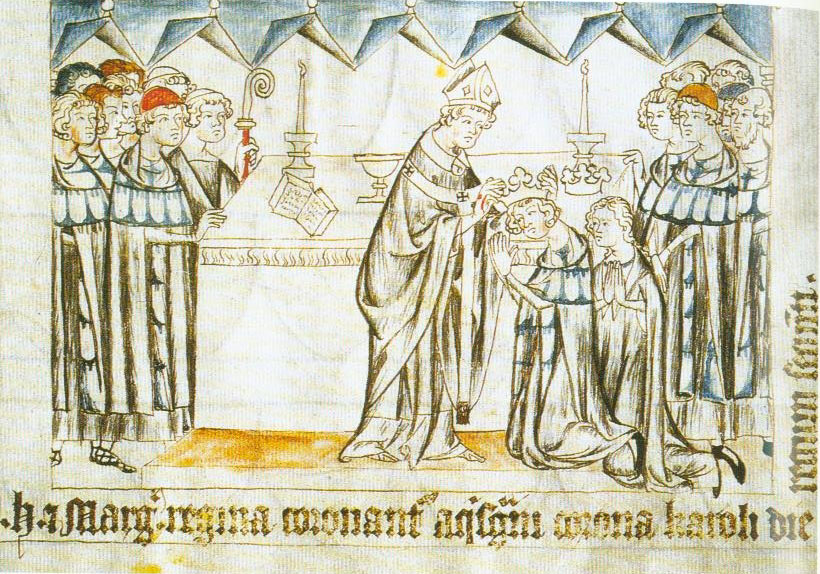
The coronation of Henry VII and his wife Margaret of Brabant. Loretta's rival Baldwin of Luxembourg, Henry's brother, stands to the left in the scarlet cap. (Margaret’s ample vair-lined peliçon, with its distinctive w-shaped neck, is typical of the sort of garments Loretta would have worn toward the end of her life.) From the Codex Balduini, 1341.

== Successors ==
From her marriage with Henry II of Sponheim (died 1323) the following children are known:

- John III of Sponheim-Starkenburg (born 1315; died 1398), married Mathilde (Mechthild) of the Palatinate
- Henry, Canon at Strassburg, Aachen, etc.
- Godfrey (died 1396), Archdeacon of Longuyon

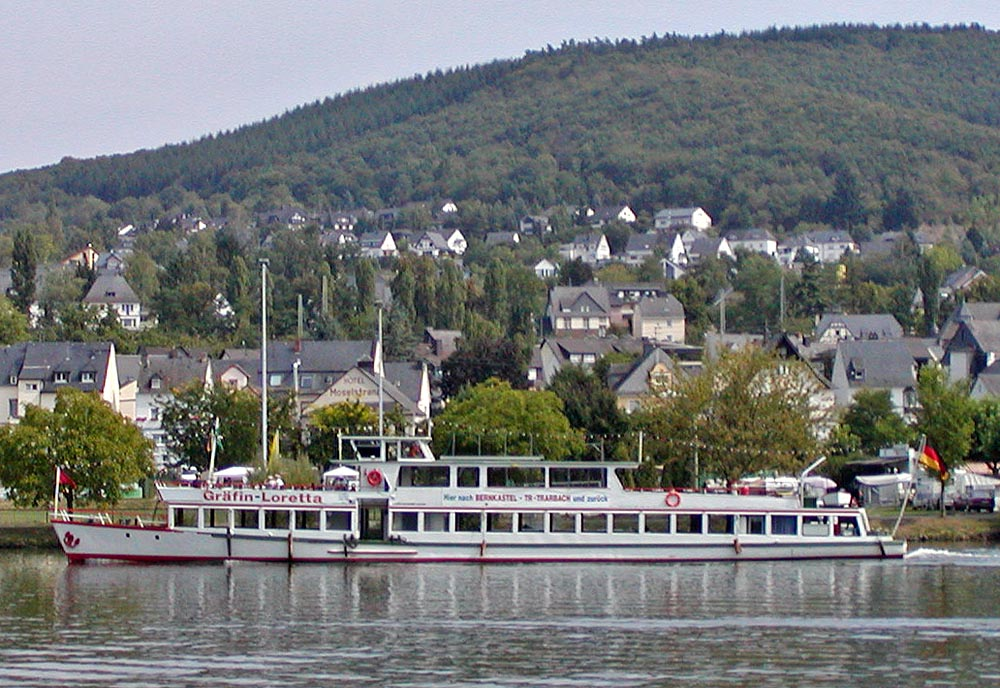
The excursion ship Gräfin Loretta on the Moselle near Bullay

== Bibliography ==
- Friedrich Back: Gräfin Loretta von Sponheim, Verein für Heimatkunde, Birkenfeld 1925
- Heinrich Disselnkötter: Gräfin Loretta von Spanheim geborene von Salm a portrait of her fourteenth century life and times. Rheinisches Archiv 1940, Heft 37.
- An extremely fictionalized account of the encounter between Loretta and Baldwin is found in Helga Glaesener’s historical novel Die Safranhändlerin (German: The Woman Who Dealt In Saffron).
- Käthe Papke: Im Unterliegen gesiegt (German: Triumphant in Defeat), Christliches Verlagshaus GmbH Stuttgart 1984, ISBN 3-7675-3216-6
