= Johann III of Sponheim-Starkenburg =

Feudal ruler

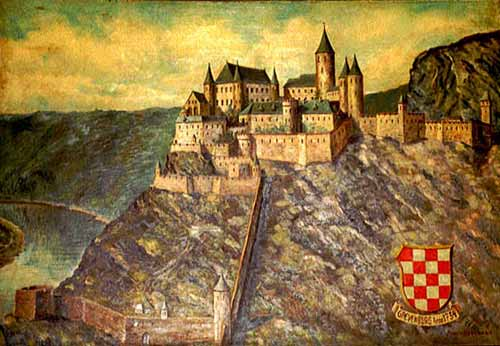
Castle Grevenburg, October 1734.

Johann III, Count of Sponheim-Starkenburg, the Older (ca. 1315 – 30 December 1398), reigned over the County of Sponheim for 67 years. He also received many epithets such as "the Noble" and, because of his declining vision, "the Blind".

== Life and work ==
Johann III of Sponheim was the first son of Count Heinrich II of Sponheim and Loretta of Salm. He had two brothers, Heinrich and Gottfried. He succeeded his grandfather, John II, in 1324, but his mother Loretta acted as his regent until his coming of age in 1331.

In 1331 he married Mechthild of the Electorate of the Palatinate, a niece of Ludwig der Bayer. During his reign, several important events occurred, such as the construction of the Heilig-Geist-Hospital in Enkirch and a war with the Archbishop of Trier, Boemund II of Saarbrücken, which caused high death tolls on both sides. Johann III of Sponheim had, along with his mother, disputes with the Trier church. In 1338 he ceded Sponheim possessions as fiefdoms to Archbishop Baldwin of Luxembourg.

Johann waged a feud against Archbishop Baldwin of Luxembourg, which was settled through atonement on 13 April 1347. On 4 January 1351 Archbishop Baldwin named Johann the chief Amtmann of the Trier lands on the right bank of the Moselle river. In 1356, Baldwin's successor, Boemund, entered a conflict with Johann and his brother-in-law Rupert I, Elector Palatine, about the toll near Enkirch. This feud was troublesome for many Trier locations because of the associated robbery and fire, but Boemund destroyed Starkenburg, Kirchberg, and cornered Sponheim in such a way that Johann had to sue for peace in 1360. The ensuing feud between Johann and his cousin Walram was not of great importance, since it was rapidly settled.

On 9 May 1368, he bestowed the Sponheim Erbmarschall office, which had been vacated by the death of Simon of Waldeck, and the village of Sevenich associated with this fiefdom upon Lord Friedrich of Ehrenburg. For Winterburg, Koppenstein, and Birkenfeld, he received city rights from Kaiser Ludwig in 1330. He built a church in Trarbach, but the year is not known. He sent an abbot from Himmerod Abbey in Traben, who had to read the Mass in Trarbach daily, and three times a week in the absence of the Count. It is unknown whether he took part on the offensive organized by Count Kuno II of Falkenstein and Count Walram of Sponheim in 1362 against the Englishmen who were ravaging the left bank of the Rhine. Johann III was the builder of the Grevenburg (Grafenburg) over Trarbach, which was first mentioned on 3 October 1357. He was buried in the Abbey of Himmerod.

== Family ==
In 1331, Johann III married Mechthild of the Palatinate (died 1375). She was a daughter of the Count Palatine of the Rhine Rudolf I and Mechthild of Nassau. Paternally, she was great-granddaughter of King Rudolf of Habsburg, and maternally granddaughter of King Adolf of Nassau. Emperor Louis the Bavarian, who had reigned since 1314, was her uncle. With the extinction of both Sponheim lines in 1437, their two daughters Mechthild and Loretta posthumously inherited the whole County of Sponheim between the Baden and the Veldenz. Children:

- Johann IV, Count of Sponheim-Starkenburg (before 1338 – 1413/14), married 1346 Elisabeth of Sponheim-Kreuznach (died after 1394)
- Mechthild (ca. 1345 – 1407/10), married 1356 Rudolf VI, Margrave of Baden (died 1372)
- Loretta (ca. 1347 – after 1364), married ca. 1374 Heinrich III, Count of Veldenz (died 1389)

== Literature ==
- (in Latin and German) Günther, Wilhelm Arnold. Codex diplomaticus rheno-mosellanus: Urkunden-Sammlung zur Geschichte der Rhein- und Mosellande, der Nahe- und Ahrgegend, und des Hundsrückens, des Meinfeldes und der Eifel. H. J. Hölscher, Koblenz 1824. (digitalized)
- (in German) Damitz, Karl von. Die Mosel mit ihren Ufern und Umgebungen von Koblenz aufwärts bis Trier: in [30] Stahlstichen [nebst Karte des Mosellaufs] : mit dem begleitenden Texte nebst einigen Episoden aus der modernen Welt. Schumacher, Cöln 1838. (digitalized)
- (in German) Dotzauer, Winfried. Geschichte des Nahe-Hunsrück-Raumes von den Anfängen bis zur Französischen Revolution. Franz Steiner Verlag, Stuttgart 2001. (digitalized)
- (in German) Immich-Spier, Hans. Anchiriacum - Enkirch 733 - 1983. Herausgegeben von der Gemeinde Enkirch, Enkirch 1983.
- (in German) Dr. Upmann. Beiträge zur Geschichte des Fürstenthums Birkenfeld. Jahresbericht der Gesellschaft für nützliche Forschungen zu Trier über die Jahre 1861 und 1862, herausgegeben von dem Secretair Schneemann, Trier 1864. (digitalized)

== Notes and references ==
Preceded by Henry II	Count of Sponheim-Starkenburg; 1331–1398	Succeeded by Johann IV
