= Henry II of Sponheim-Starkenburg =

German noble

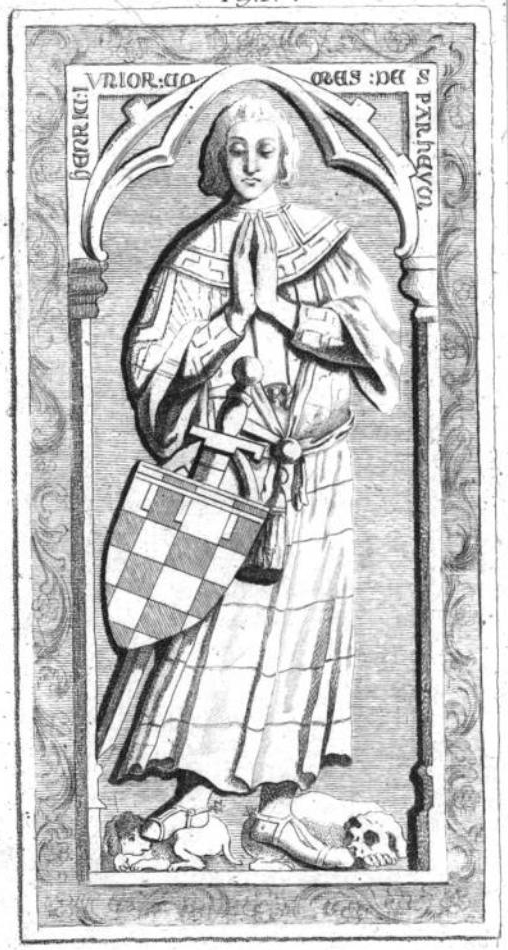
His gravestone

Henry II of Sponheim, the Younger (born between 1292 and 1295; died before 11 October 1323, Wolfstein) was a German nobleman of the house of Sponheim.

== Biography ==
He married Loretta of Salm in 1315.
He may have ruled the county of Sponheim alongside his father, John II, Count of Sponheim-Starkenburg, for a brief while; however, he pre-deceased his father by five months. His father John II was succeeded by his grandson (the son of Henry II), John III who was, however, only nine years old at his grandfathers death. For the following seven years, 1324–1331, his mother, Loretta of Sponheim, acted as his regent.

=== Children ===
- John III (1315-1398), married September 1331 Mechthild von der Pfalz
- Henry, Stiftsherr (Canon) of Strassburg and Aachen.
- Gottfried, Archdeacon of Longuyon (died 1396)

Preceded by John II	Count of Sponheim-Starkenburg unclear	Succeeded by Johann III
