= Trier Cathedral =

- Cathedral of St. Peter
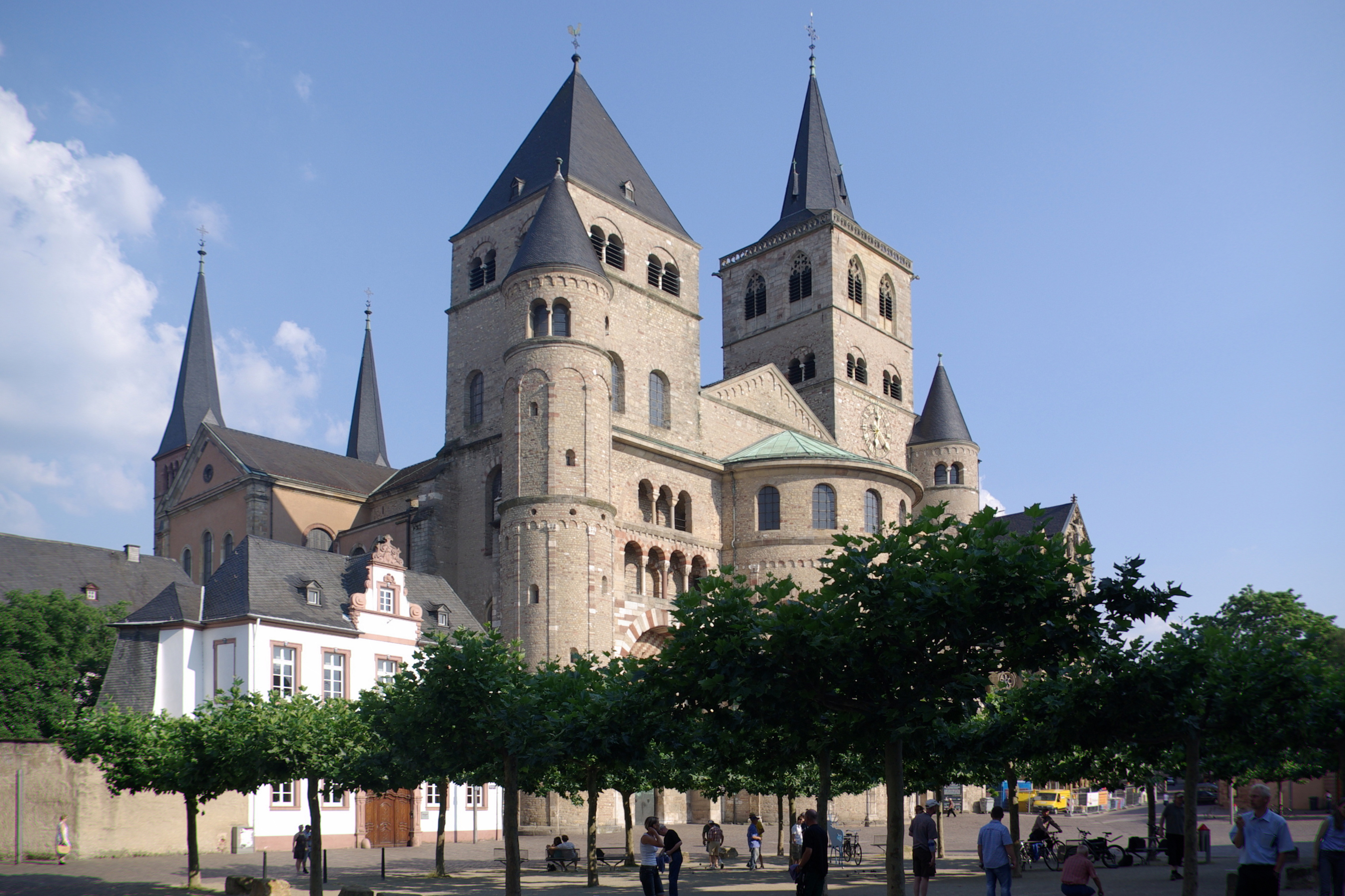
- Trier Cathedral
- 49°45′22″N 6°38′35″E
- Location: Liebfrauenstraße 12; Trier, Rhineland-Palatinate
- Country: Germany
- Denomination: Roman Catholic
- Website: www.dominformation.de

History
- Status: Cathedral

Architecture
- Functional status: Active
- Heritage designation: UNESCO World Heritage Site
- Designated: 1986
- Style: Romanesque
- Years built: c. 270 (first building)
- Groundbreaking: 1235 (current building)
- Completed: 1270

Specifications
- Materials: Roman brick

Administration
- Province: Cologne
- Diocese: Trier

Clergy
- Bishop: The Rt Revd Dr Stephan Ackermann

The High Cathedral of Saint Peter in Trier (German: Hohe Domkirche St. Peter zu Trier), or Trier Cathedral (German: Trierer Dom), is a Roman Catholic cathedral in Trier, Rhineland-Palatinate, Germany. It is the oldest cathedral in Germany and the largest religious structure in Trier, notable for its long life span and grand design. The central part of the nave was built of Roman brick in the early fourth century, resulting in a cathedral that was added onto gradually in different eras. The imposing Romanesque westwork, with four towers and an additional apse, has been copied repeatedly. The Trier Cathedral Treasury contains an important collection of Christian art. In 1986 the church was listed as a UNESCO World Heritage Site, as part of the Roman Monuments, Cathedral of St. Peter and Church of Our Lady in Trier.

== History ==
According to certain sources, the cathedral was commissioned by Emperor Constantine the Great and built on top of a palace of Saint Helena, his mother. Following the conversion of Constantine to Christianity, Bishop Maximin (329–346) is said to have coordinated the construction of a cathedral, which at the time was the grandest ensemble of ecclesiastical structures in the West outside Rome. On a groundplan four times the size of the present cathedral no less than four basilicas, a baptistry and outbuildings were constructed. Archaeological research confirms that the current cathedral, as well as the adjacent cloisters and Church of Our Lady, is raised upon the foundations of ancient Roman buildings of Augusta Treverorum. The four piers of the crossing of the present church, as well as parts of the brick outer walls, are remnants from this period.

The fourth-century church was left in ruins by the Franks, with only the outer walls remaining, but it was rebuilt. It was destroyed again by the Vikings in 882. Under Archbishop Egbert (d. 993) rebuilding started, completed by Poppo of Babenberg (1016–1041). The famous west façade dates from this period, although the apse was not finished until 1196. Throughout the centuries the church continued to be rebuilt and embellished, according to the fashion of the period with Gothic vaults, Renaissance sculptures and Baroque chapels, but the overall style of the building remains Romanesque with a Roman core.

== Description ==
=== Exterior ===
Large sections of Roman brickwork are visible on the north façade. These belong to an originally square building, of which ancient masonry still stands on the opposite side. These preserved parts of the core building from around 340 make the cathedral the oldest church building still in use in Germany. The somewhat older Trier Aula Palatina of Constantine the Great (around 311) was, however, not built as a church, but as an Aula Regia, and the core building of St. Gereon's Basilica, Cologne, from between 350 and 365, which also still partially exists, was built as a mausoleum. While Trier (Augusta Treverorum) belonged to the province of Gallia Belgica, Cologne (Colonia Claudia Ara Agrippinensium) was the capital of the Roman province of Germania Inferior. These were the two largest ancient Roman cities in present-day Germany.

The imposing westwork of Trier Cathedral consist of five symmetrical sections and is typical of Romanesque architecture under the Salian emperors (11th century). The westwork was started by Poppo von Babenberg (1010–47) and completed by Eberhard (1047–66). Its four towers are more or less symmetrically placed on both sides of the western apse. It served as an example for many other churches in Rhine-Meuse area. The Latin inscription above the clock on the tallest tower reads "NESCITIS QVA HORA DOMINVS VENIET" ("You do not know what time the Lord is coming"). The east choir is less prominent, due to its built-in location and the addition of the Chapel of the Holy Tunic in the early 18th century.

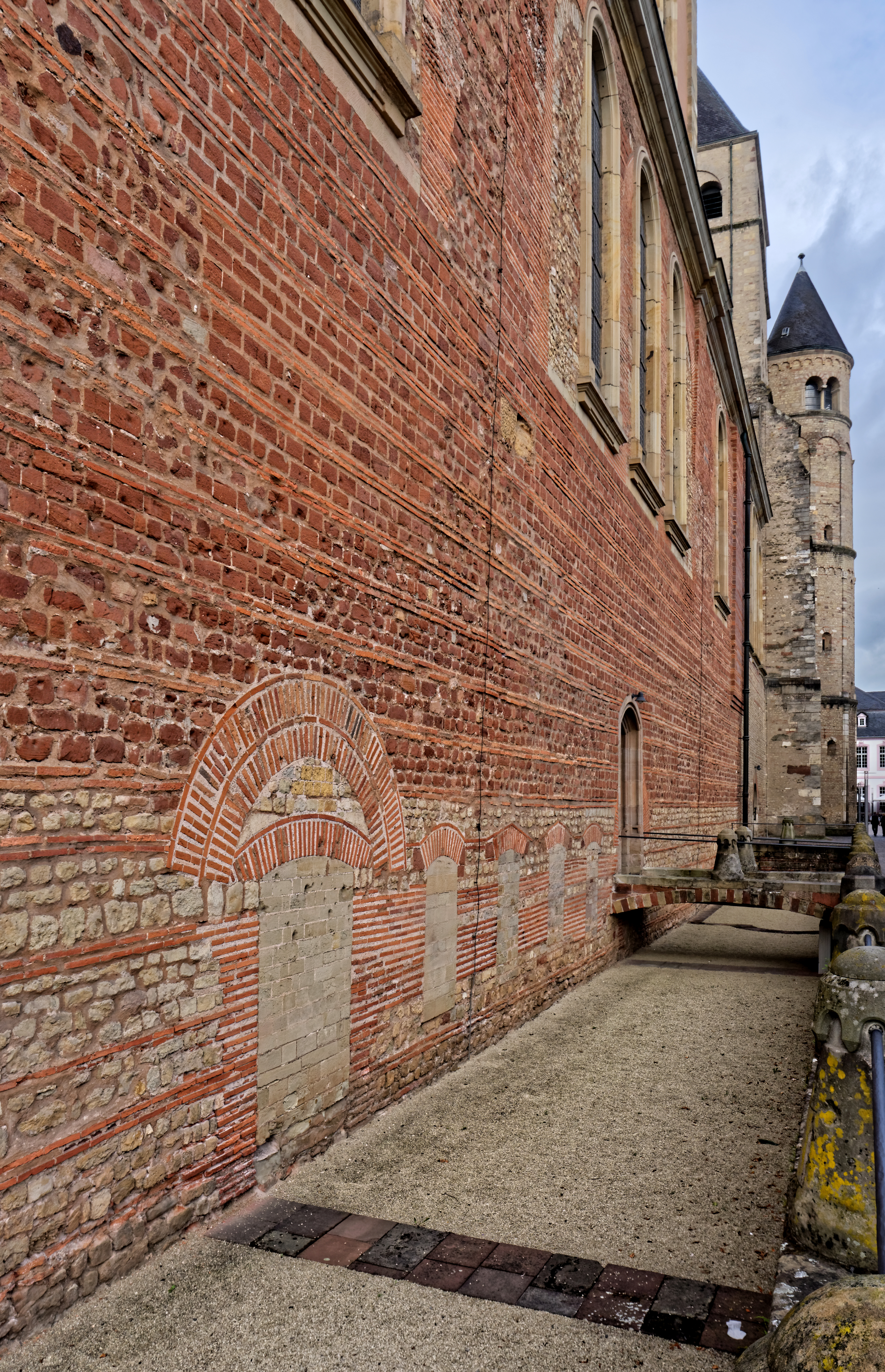
Roman brickwork at the north façade

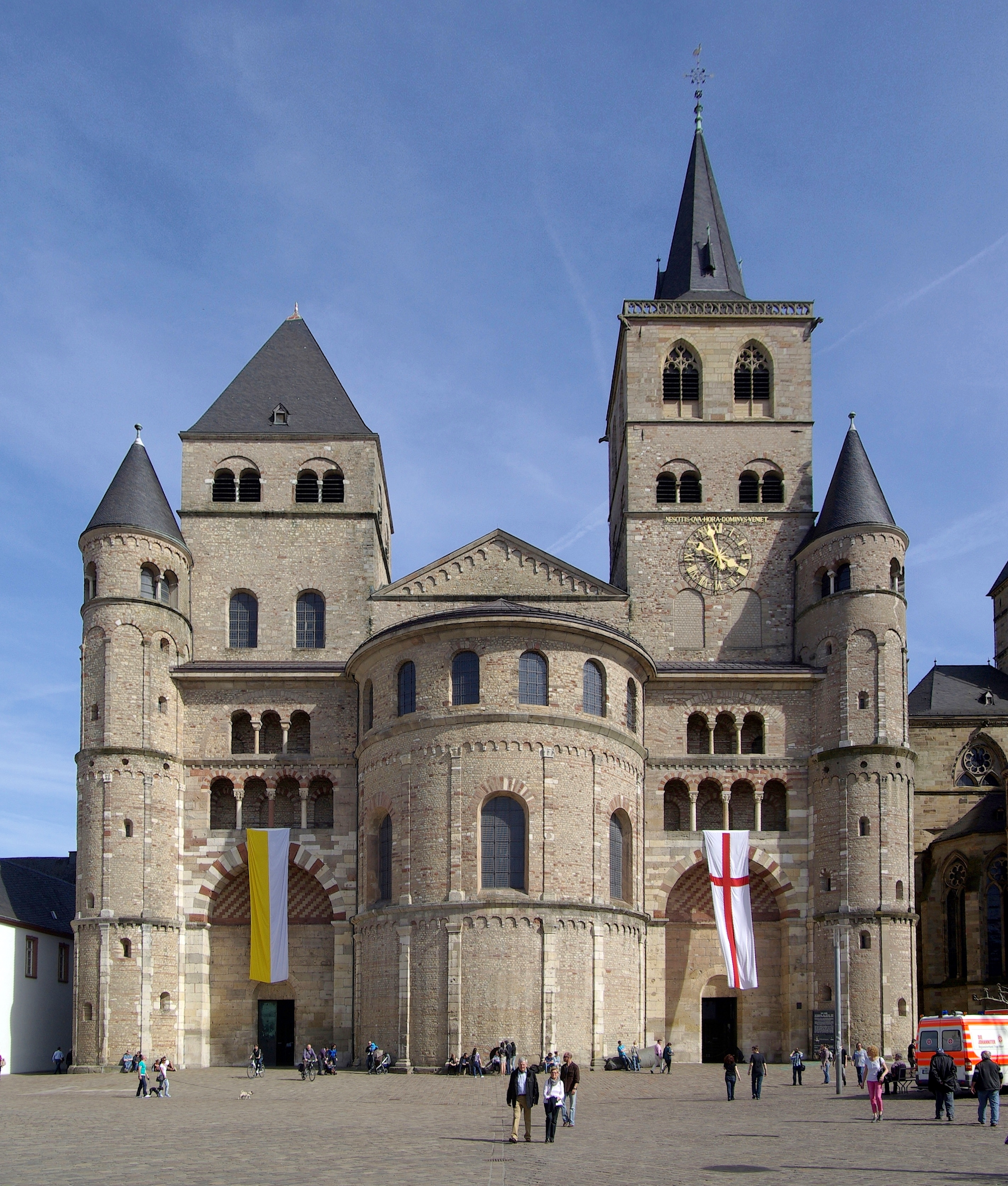
Westwork with four towers

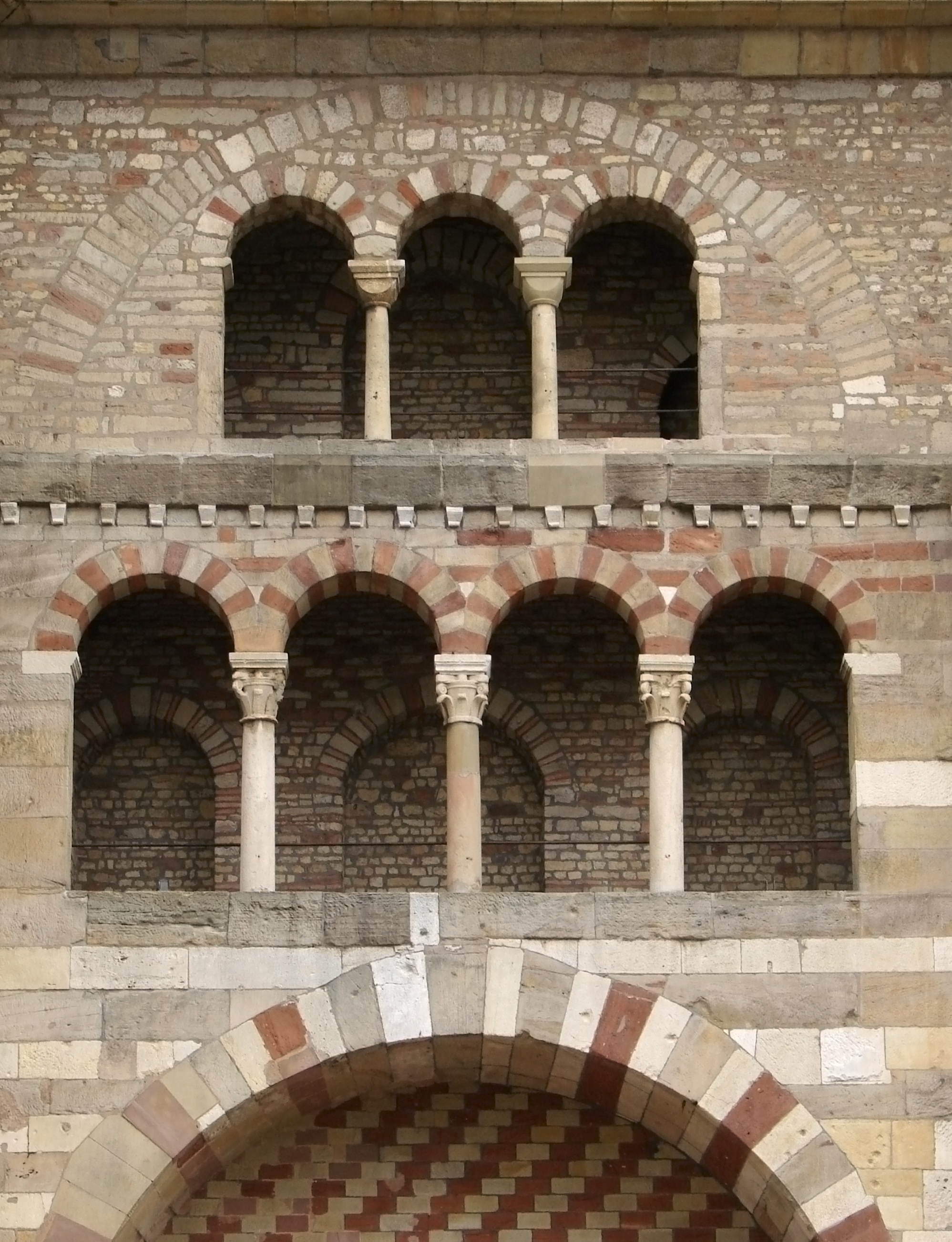
Detail westwork in Salian style

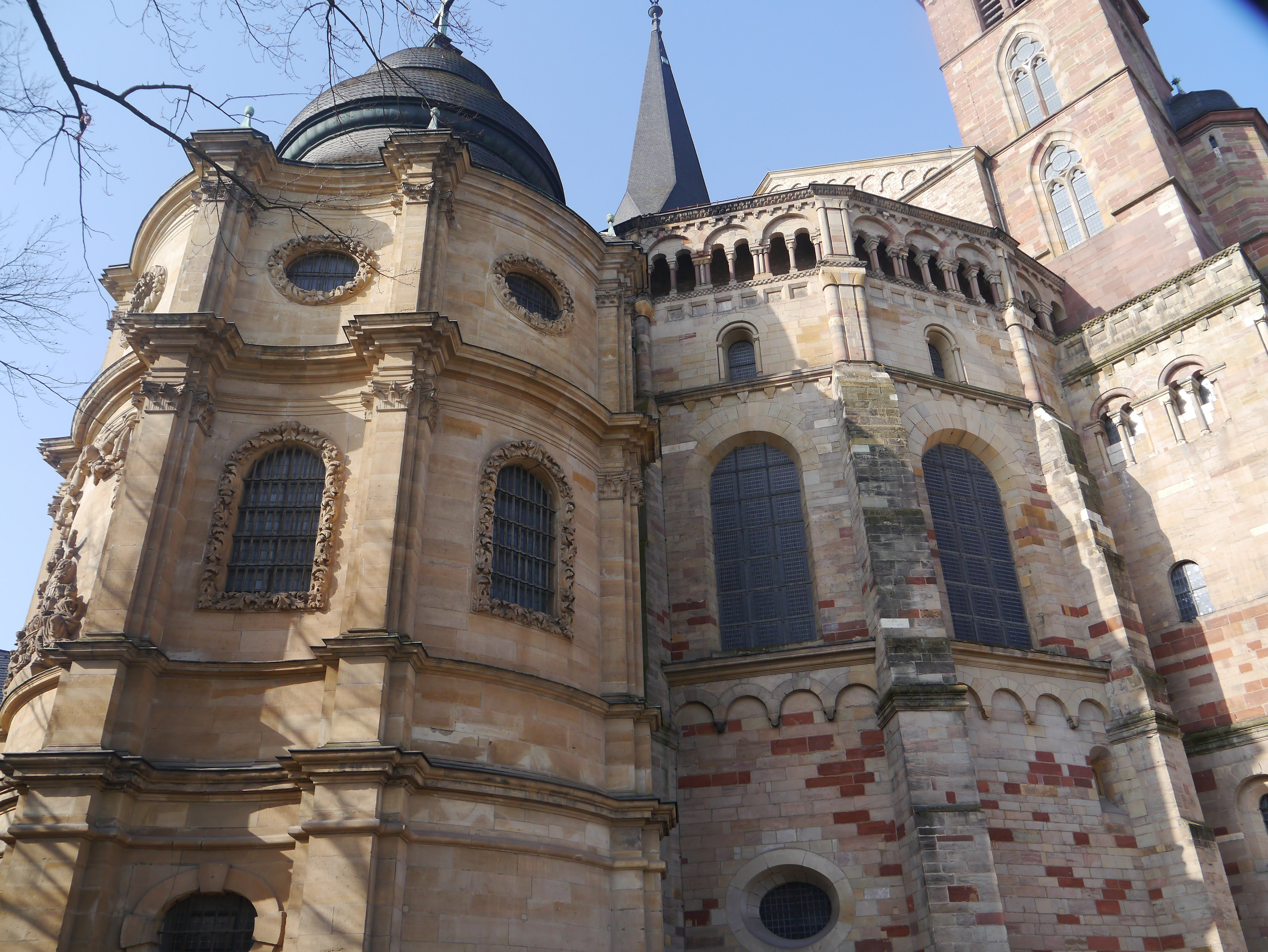
East choir and Chapel of the Holy Tunic

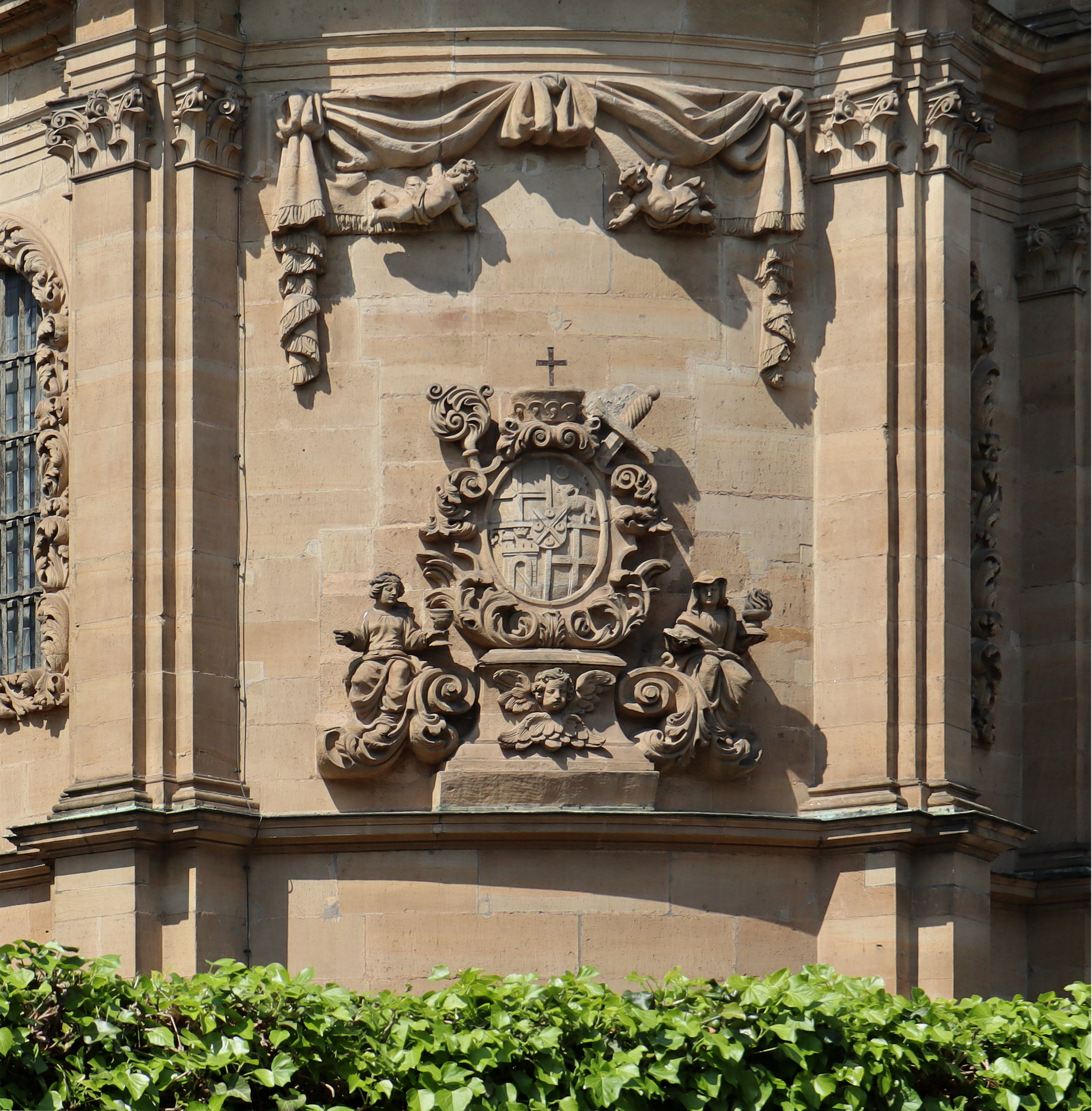
Coat of arms of Johann Hugo von Orsbeck, from 1676 to 1711 Archbishop of Trier

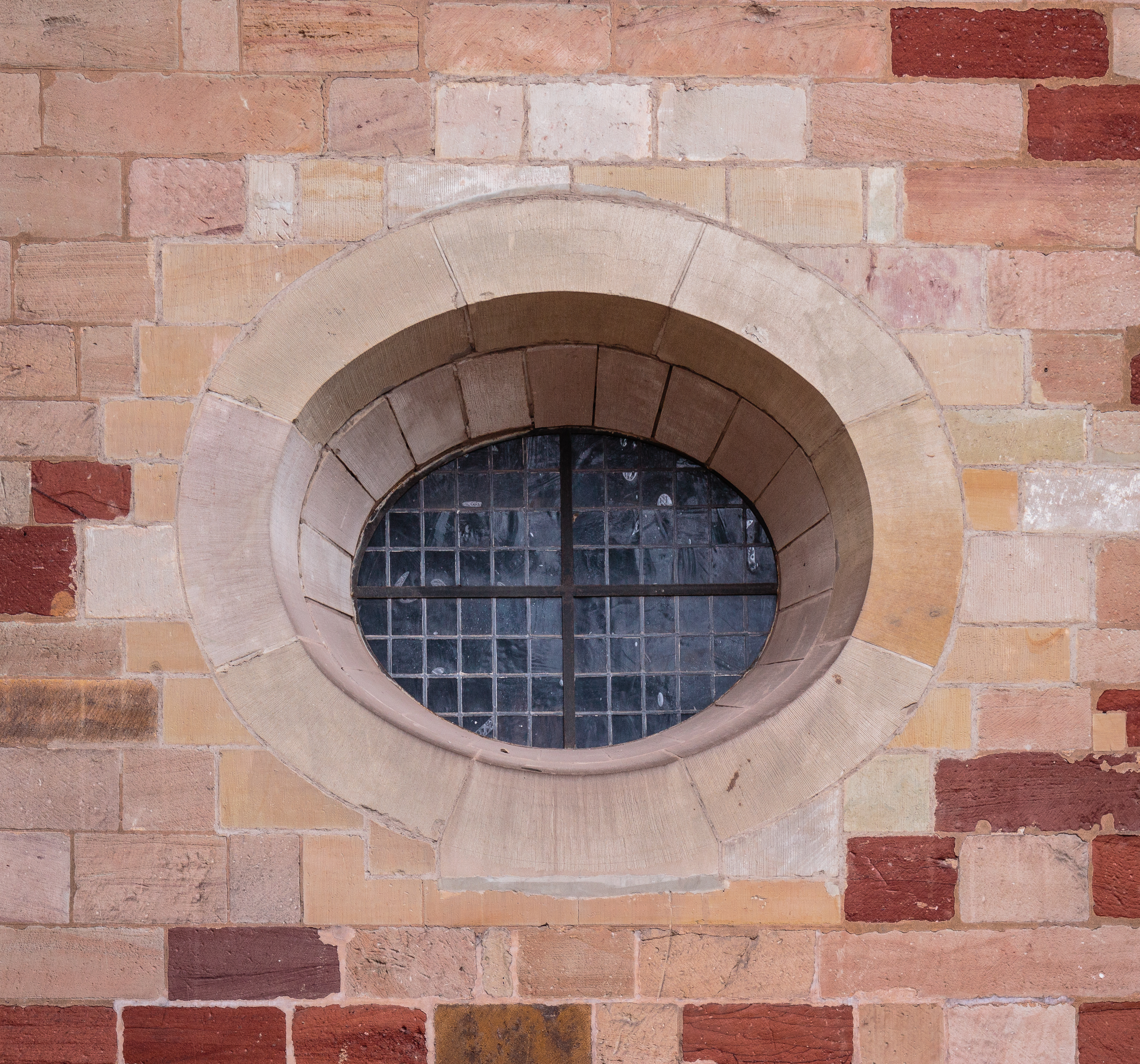
Detail of the exterior. (barred window)

=== Interior ===
The interior measures 112.5 by 41 meter. It consists of three largely Romanesque naves with Gothic vaulting. The original Roman structure is difficult to read on the inside but its basic rectangular form may still be recognized in the three easternmost bays of the nave. The four original columns were reused in the 11th century but changed into cruciform piers. A Baroque chapel for the relic of the Seamless robe of Jesus, recovered from the previous main altar in 1512, was added behind the east choir and is visible through an opening in the wall. The west choir is also decorated in the style of the German Baroque, and so are the chapels of Our Lady and the Holy Sacrament (with the "Golden Gate", part of the former rood screen), and most of the altars in the church. A Romanesque tympanum depicts Christ with the Virgin Mary and Saint Peter. The main church organ appears old but dates from 1974.

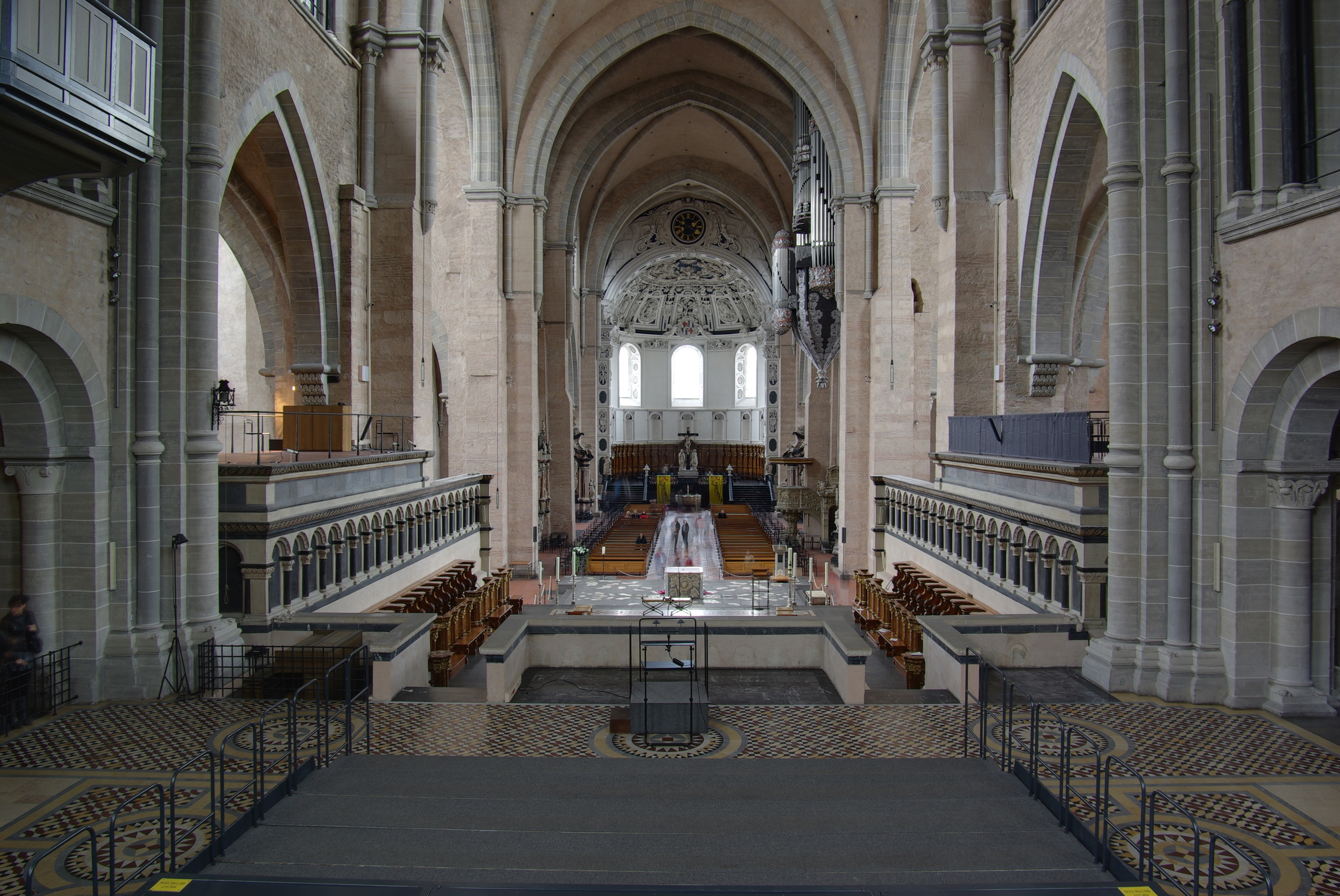
Interior view towards the west

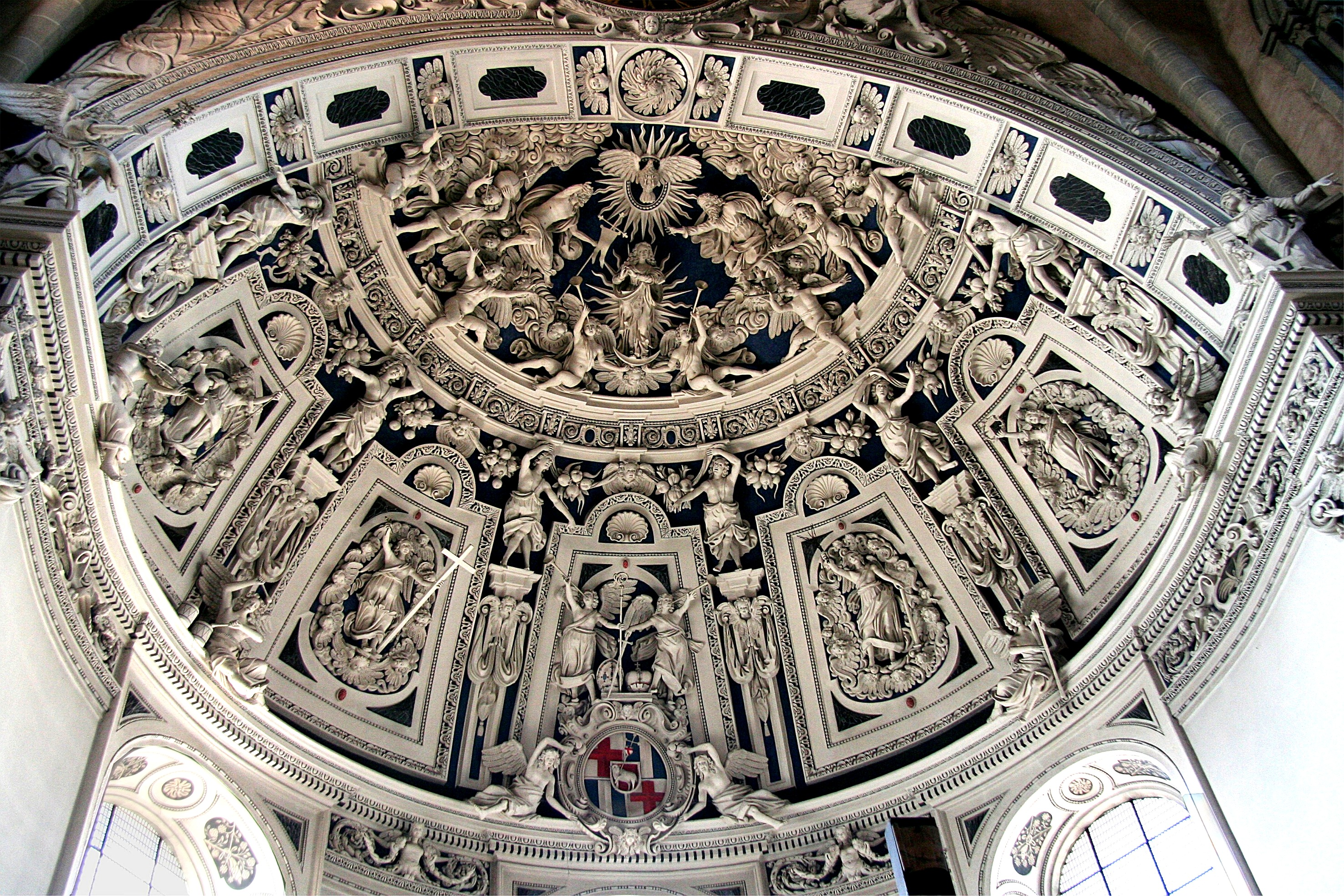
Baroque west choir ceiling

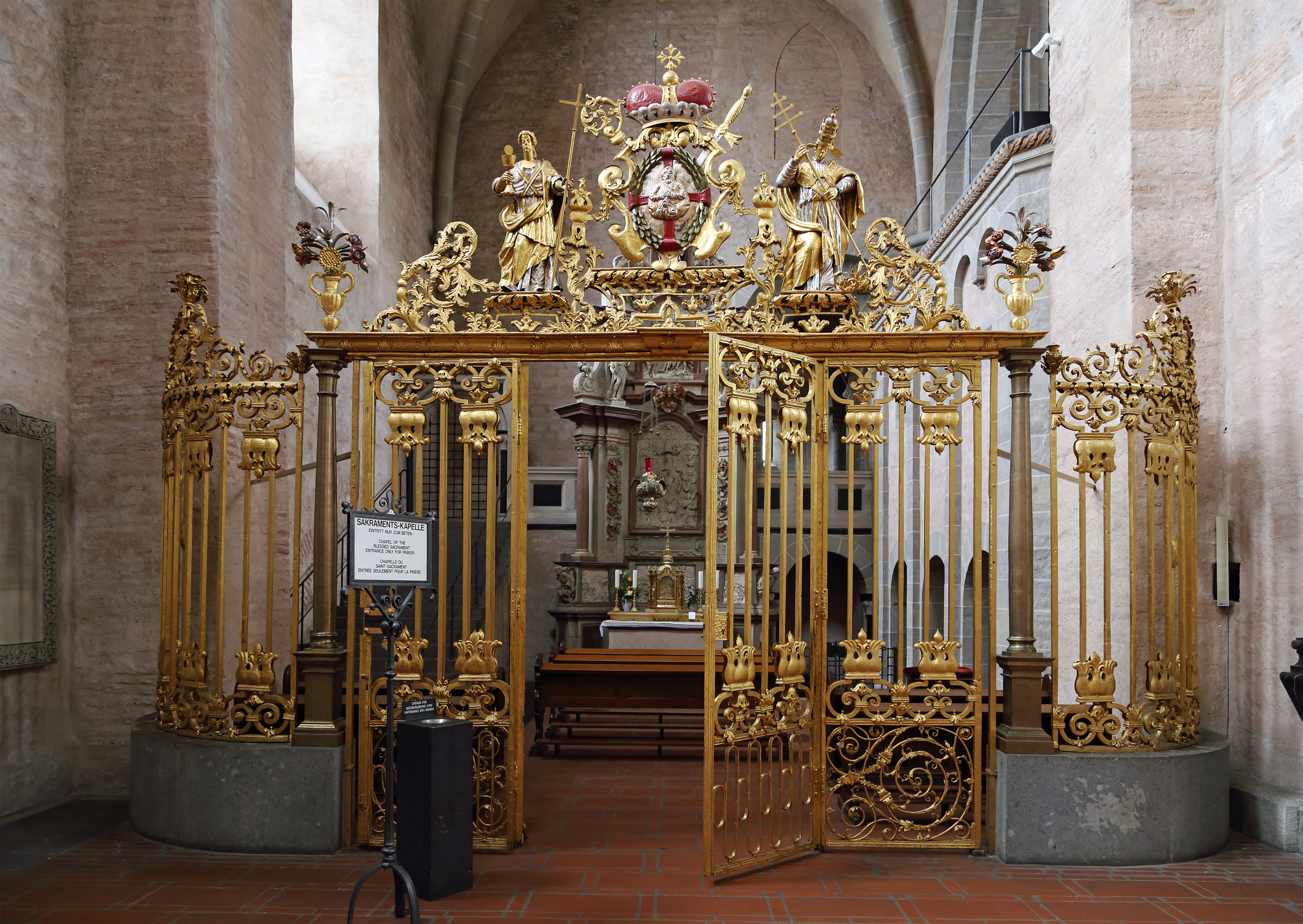
Golden Gate

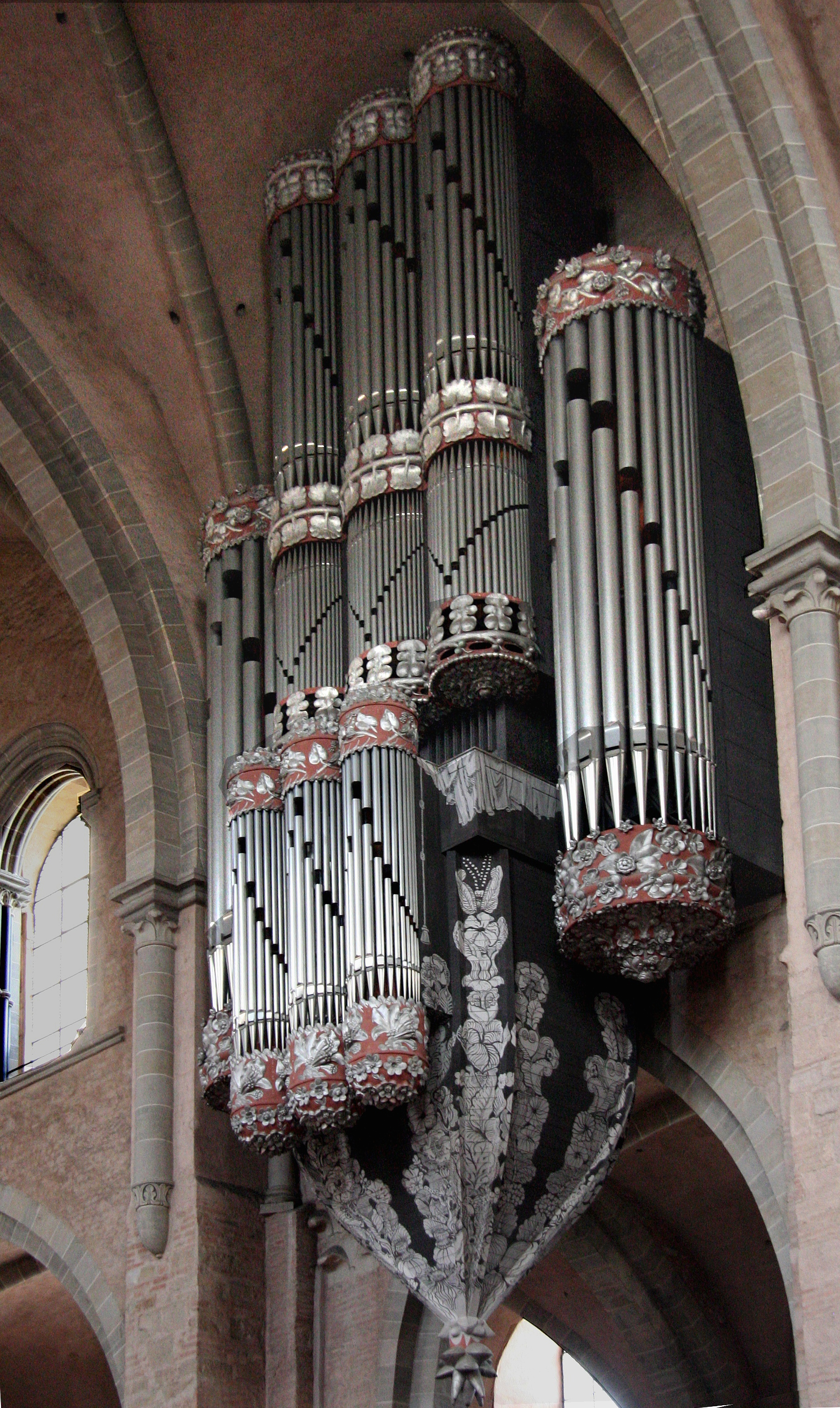
Church organ

=== Burials ===
- Henry I, archbishop of Trier († 964)
- Udo, archbishop of Trier († 1078)
- Baldwin, archbishop of Trier († 1354)
- Bohemond II, archbishop of Trier († 1367)
- Richard von Greiffenklau zu Vollrads, archbishop-elector of Trier († 1531)
- Lothar von Metternich, archbishop-elector of Trier († 1623)
- Johann Hugo von Orsbeck, archbishop-elector of Trier († 1711)
- Franz Georg von Schönborn, archbishop-elector of Trier († 1756)
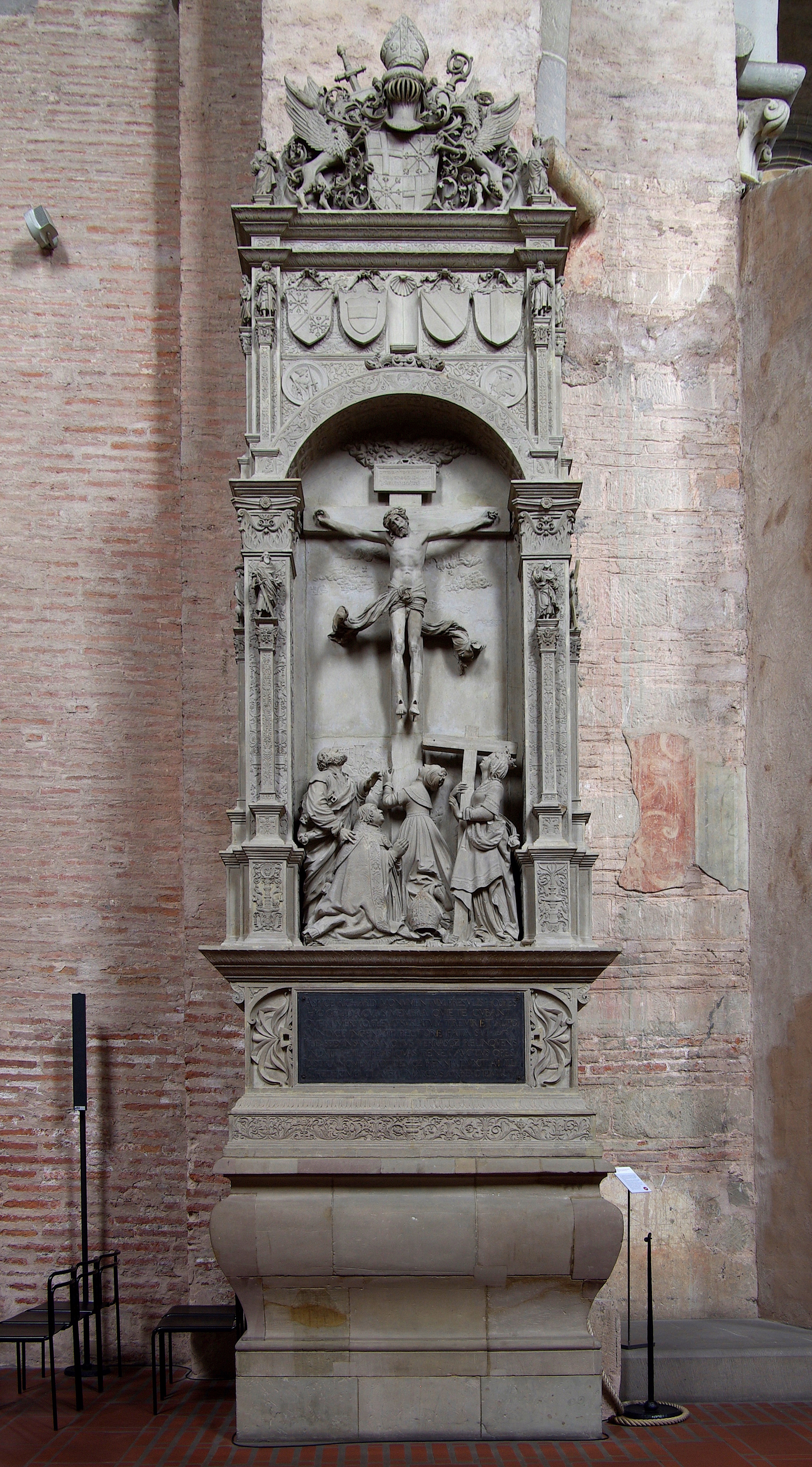
Greiffenklau Altar, 1531

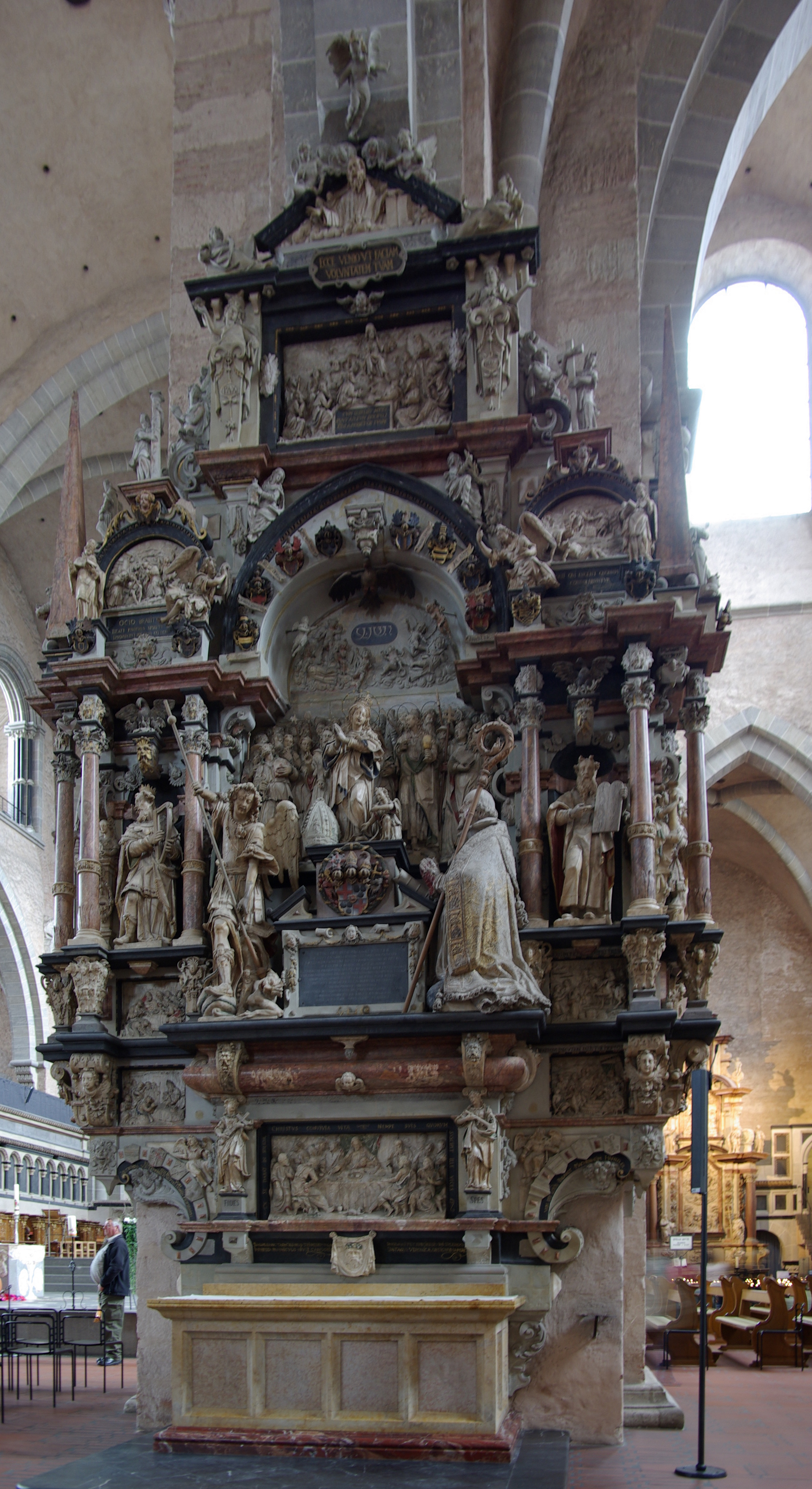
Metternich Altar, 1623

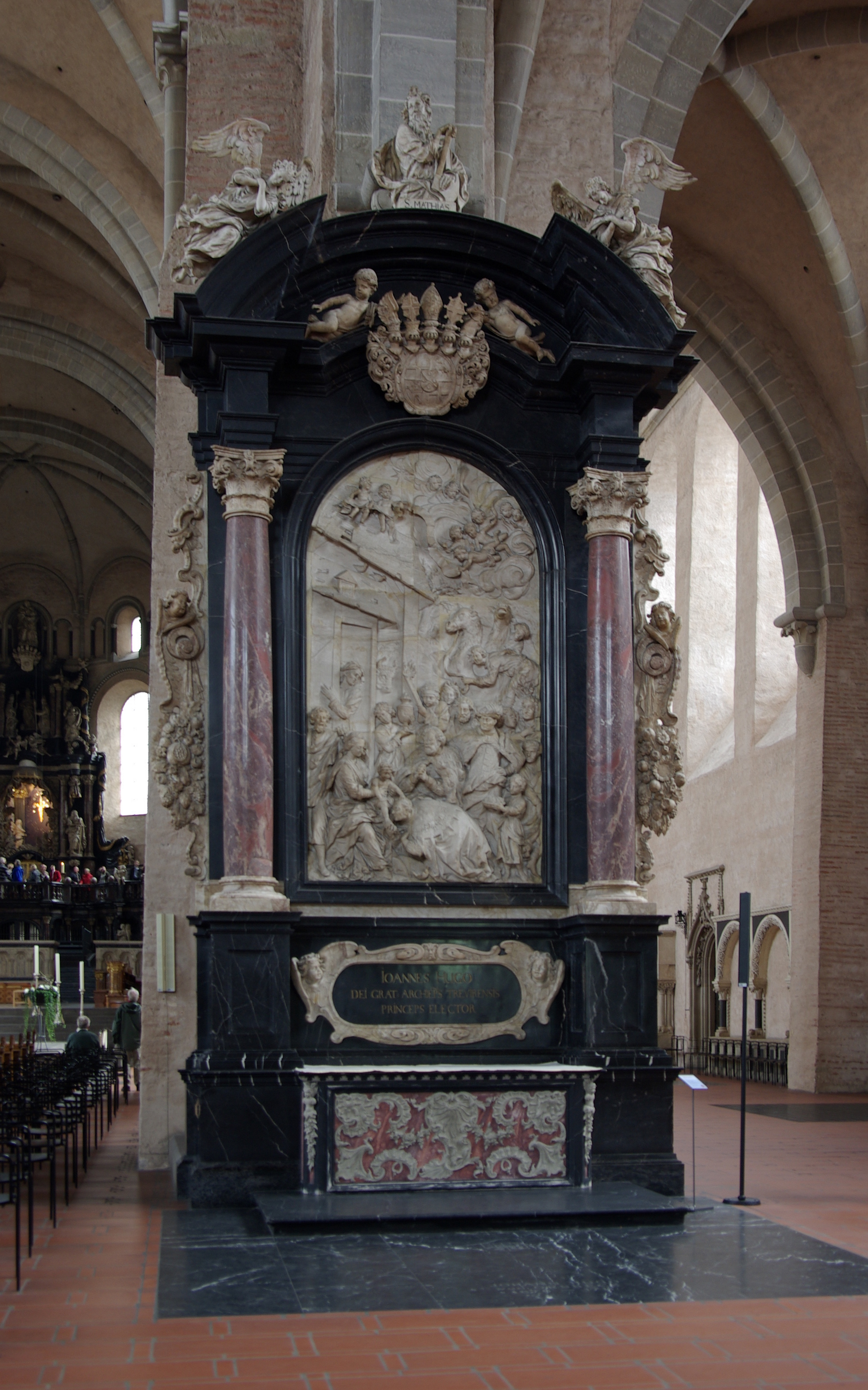
Orsbeck Altar, 1711

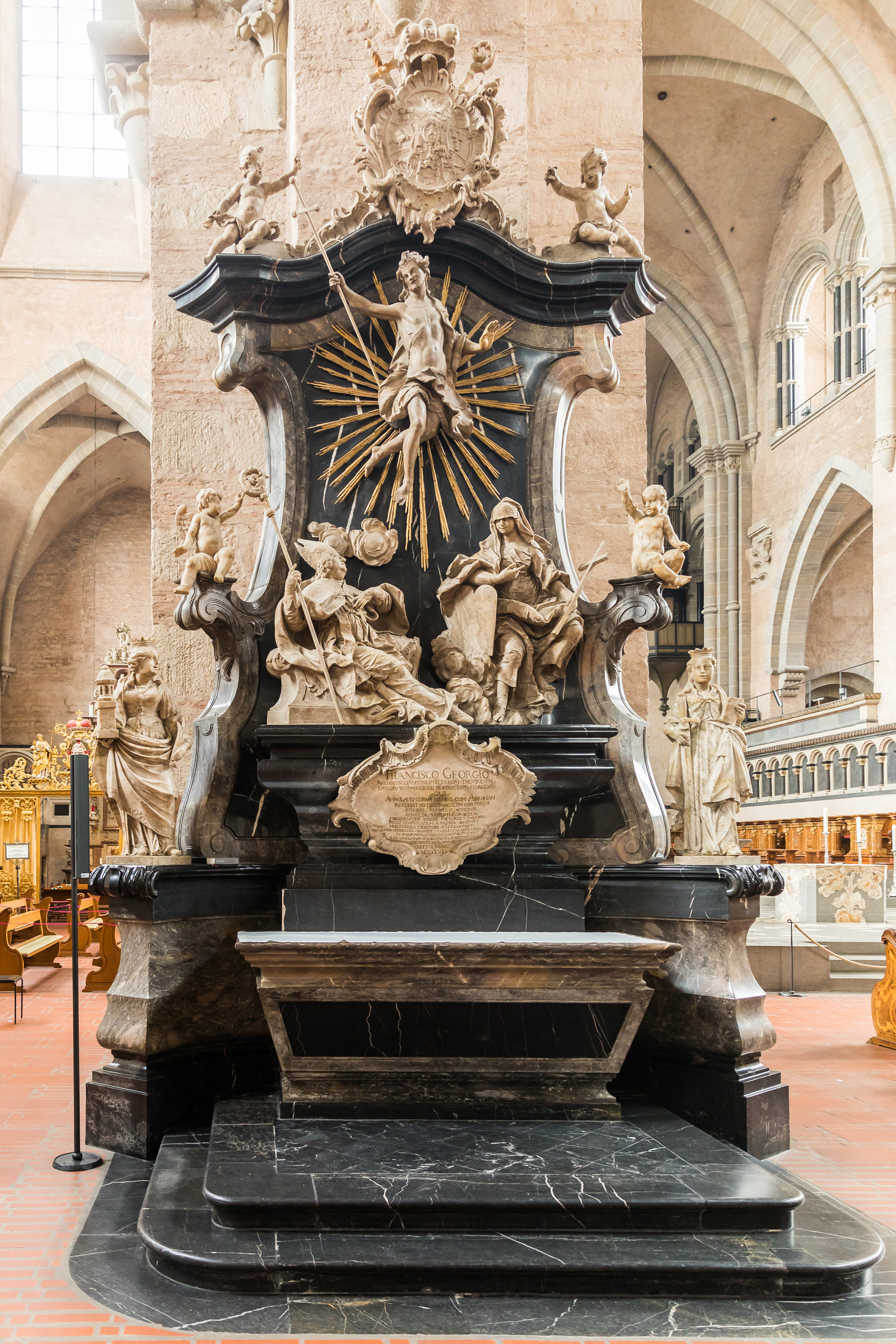
Schönborn Altar, 1756

=== Treasury and relics ===
The Seamless Robe of Jesus, the robe said to have been worn by Jesus shortly before his crucifixion, is the best-known relic of the cathedral. It is kept in an annex chapel and shown to the public infrequently, most recently in 2012. The skull of St. Helena, the mother of Emperor Constantine, is displayed in the east crypt of the cathedral. Her drinking cup is kept in the cathedral's treasury as well as the so-called Egbert Shrine. This is a decorated portable altar that contained the sole of a sandal of St. Andrew and other relics. Another reliquary from the same period contains a Holy Nail from the Cross of Jesus. Both objects are considered highlights of Ottonion goldsmithery.

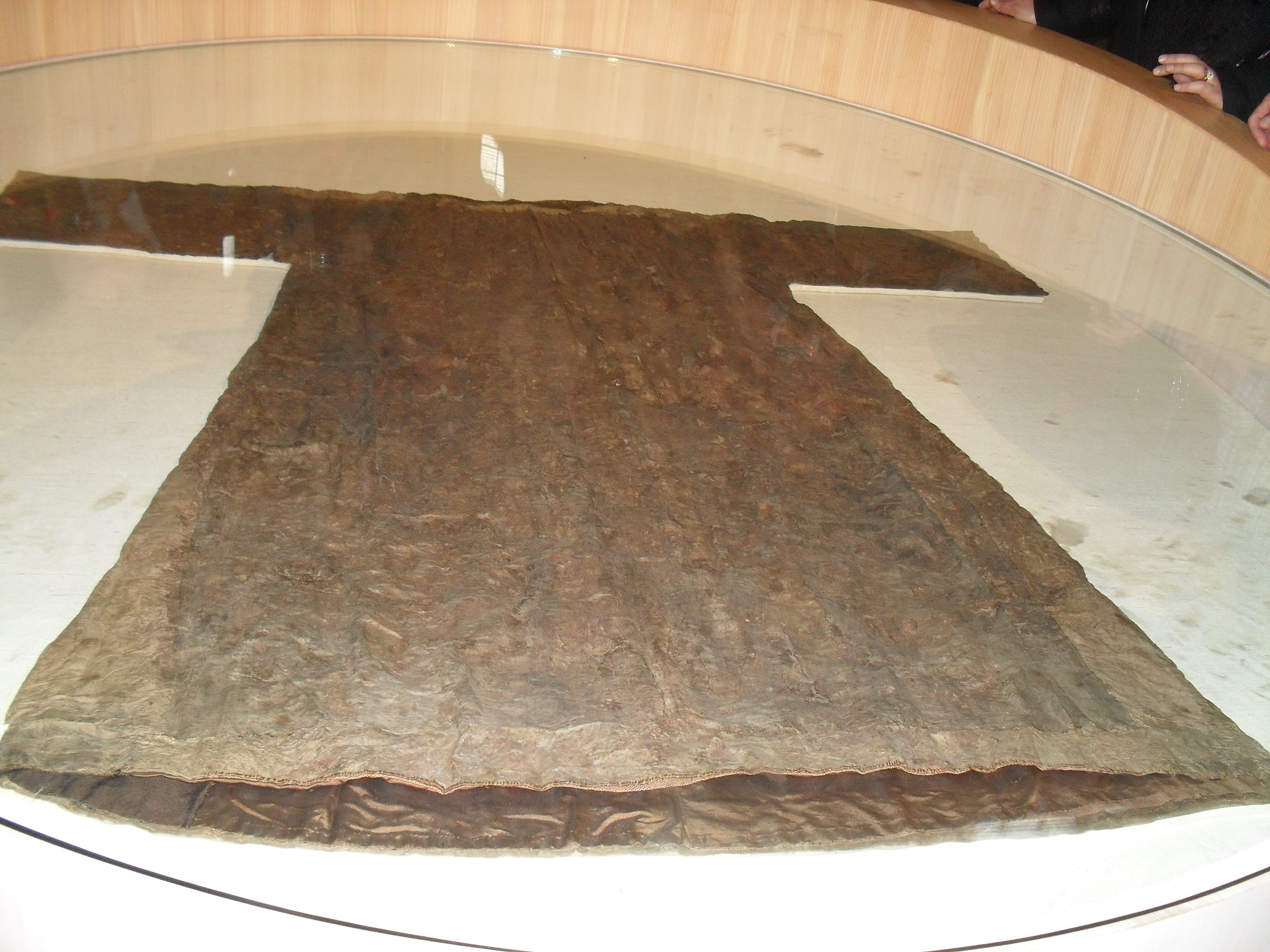
Holy Tunic

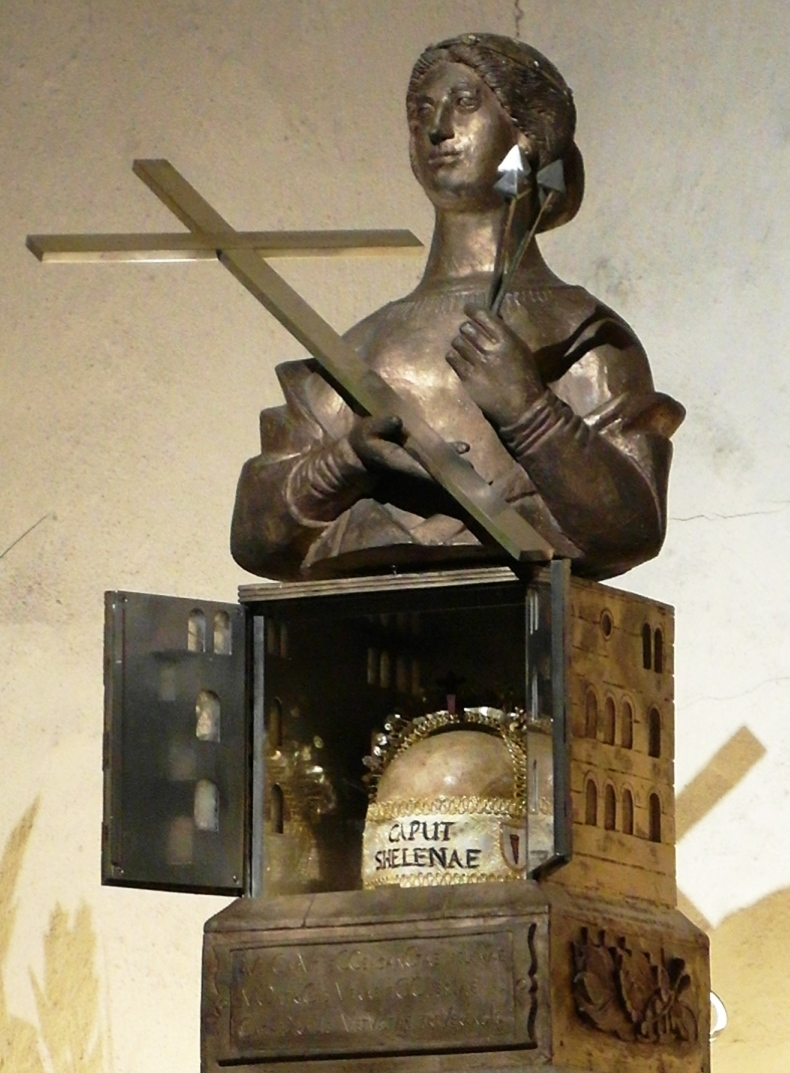
Skull of St. Helena

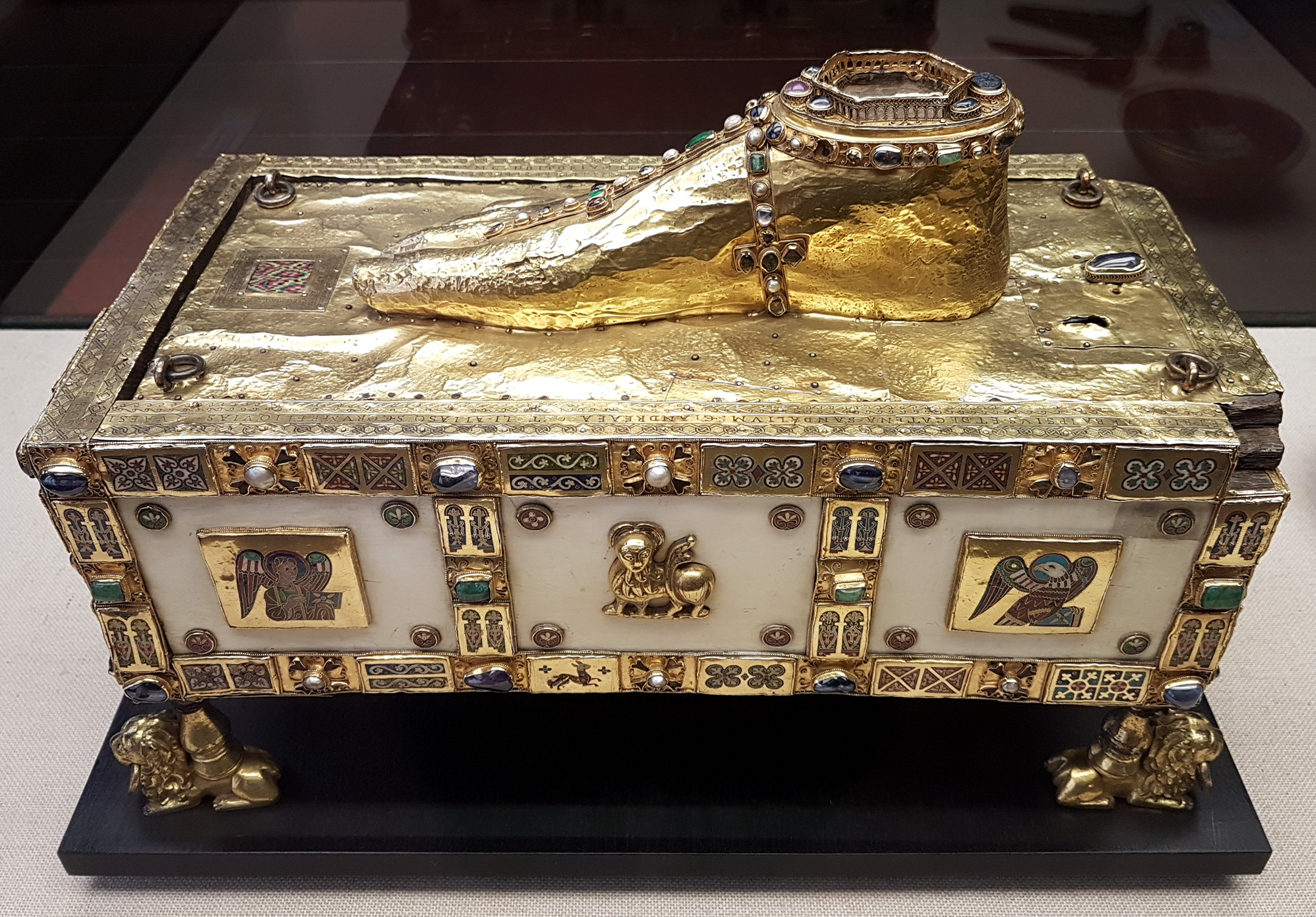
Egbert Shrine

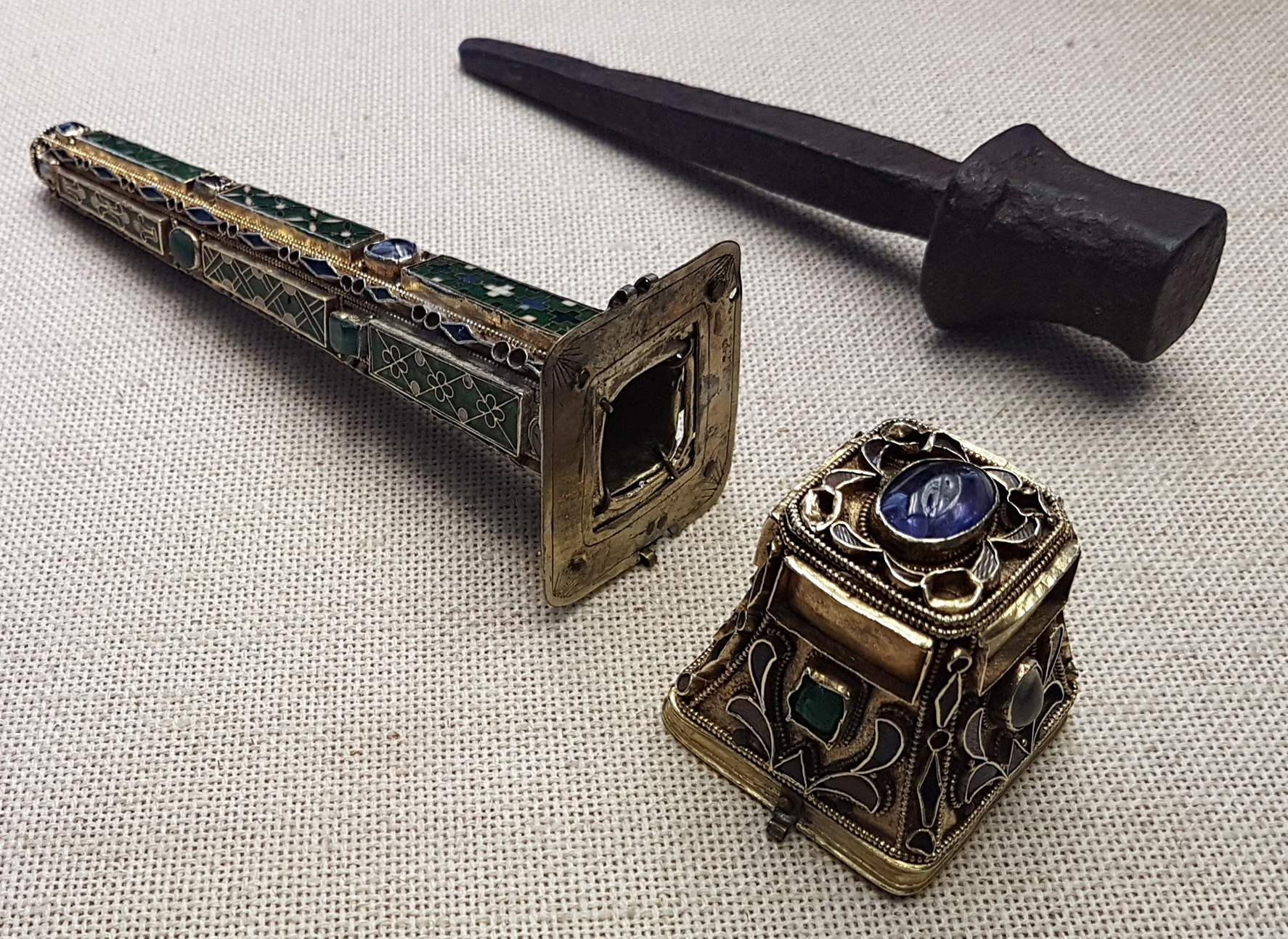
Holy Nail Reliquary

=== Cloisters ===
The Gothic cloisters were built between 1245 and 1270. They connect the Cathedral and the Liebfrauenkirche. In the western section of the cloisters is a chapel where the cathedral's canons were buried. On the outside wall is a bell from 1682. Adjacent to the cloisters are several annex buildings. The so-called "Romanesque Room" was the former cathedral school. The "Gothic Room" was used for distributing bread to the poor.

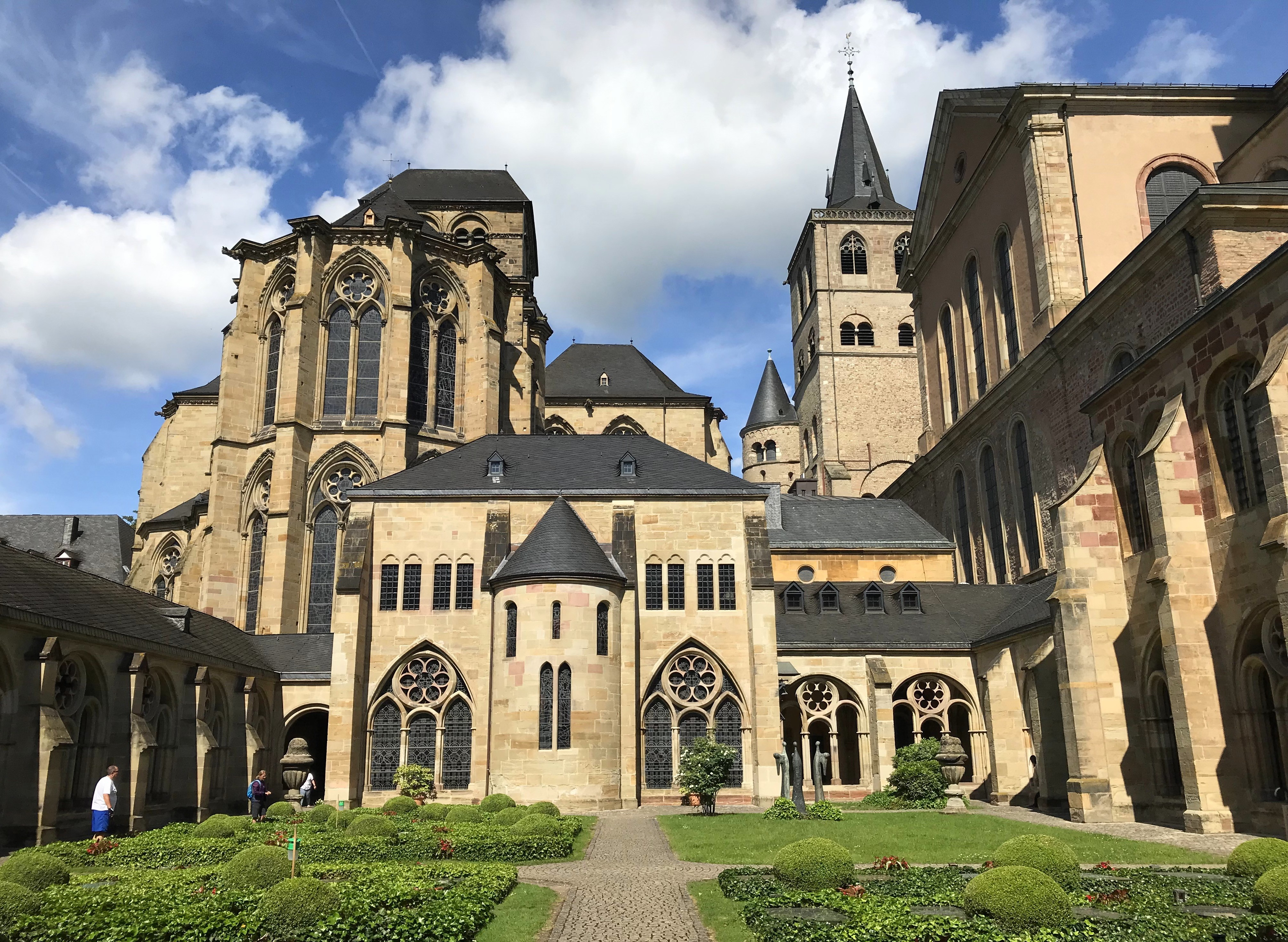
Cloister yard

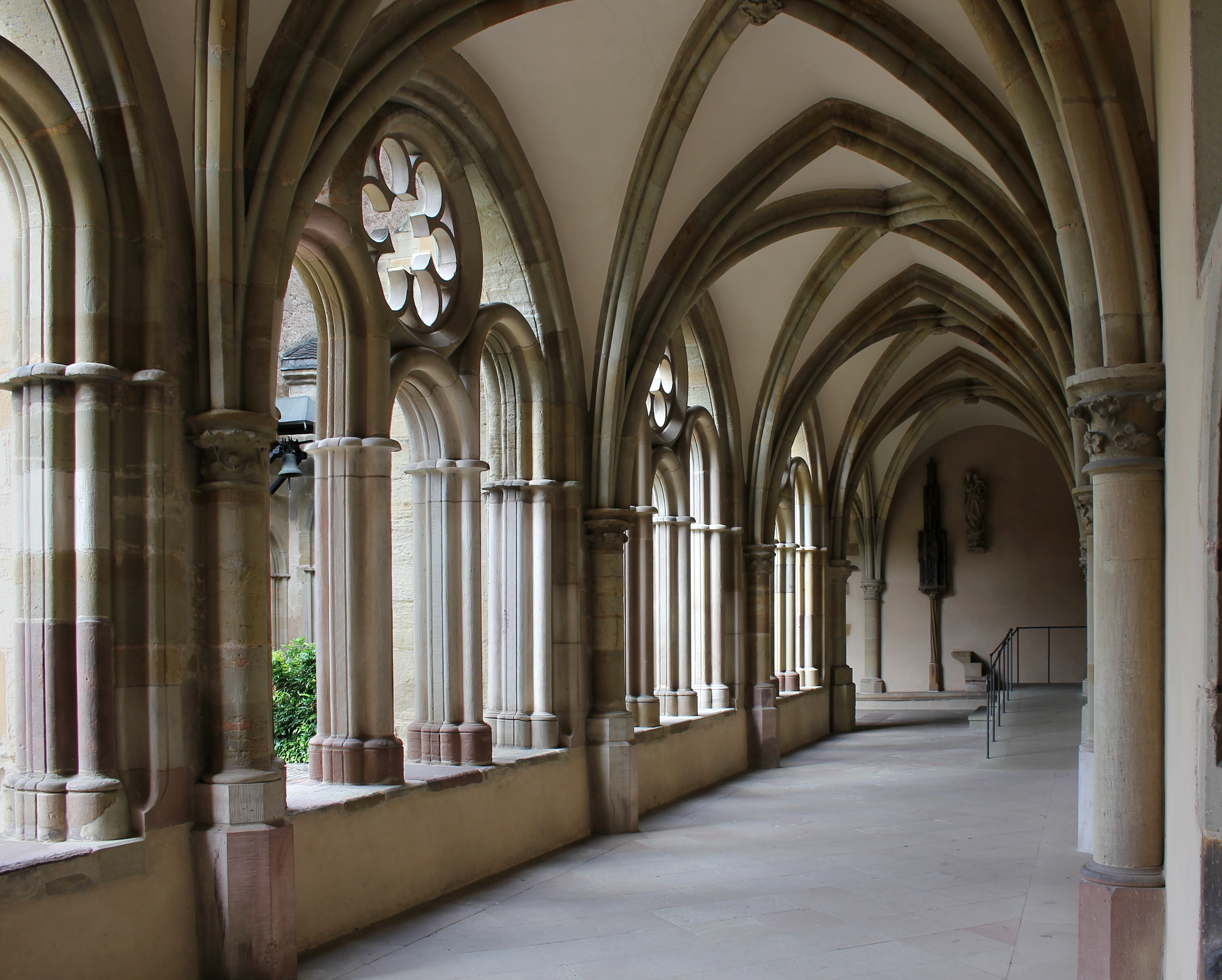
Cloister corridor

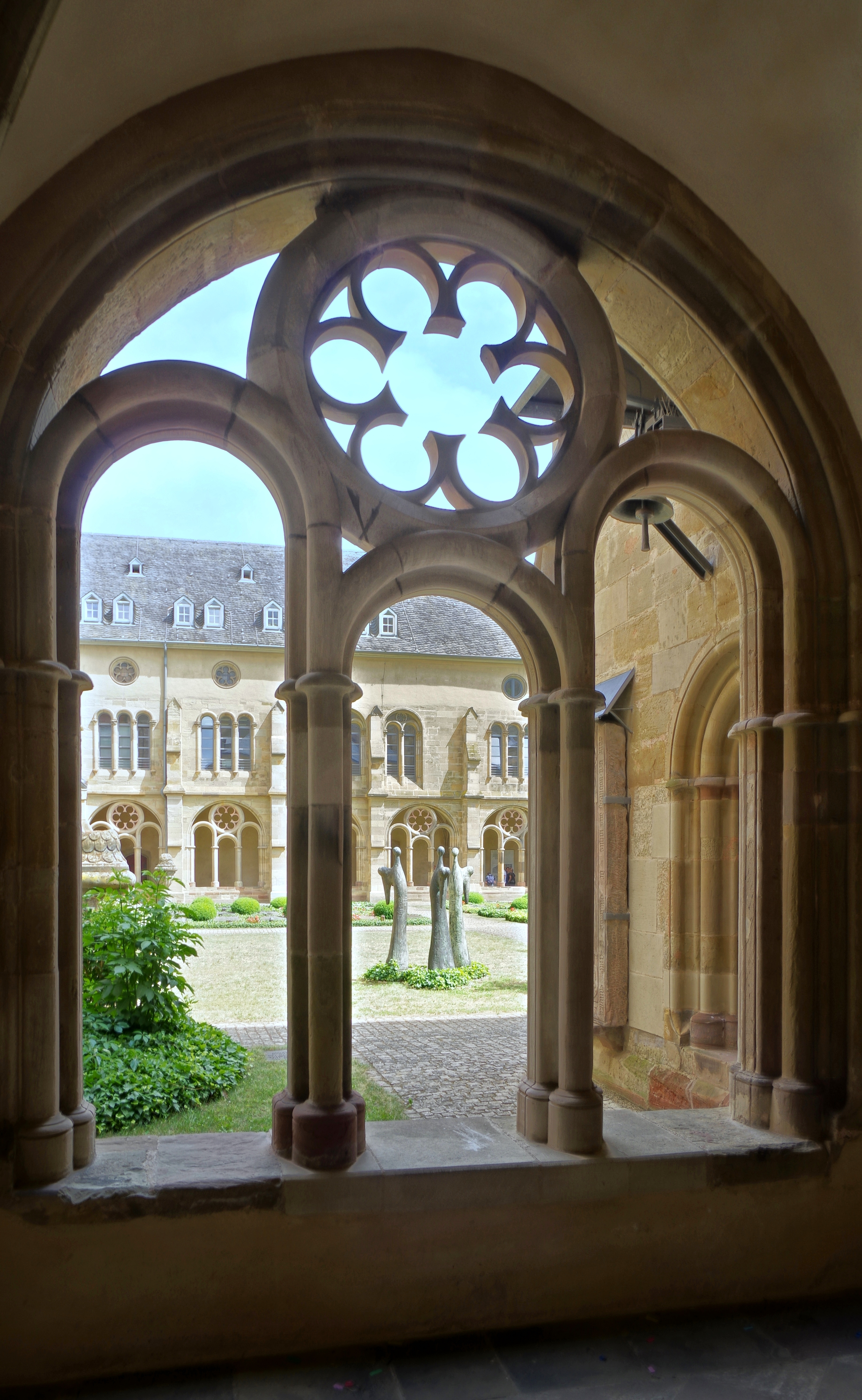
Traced window

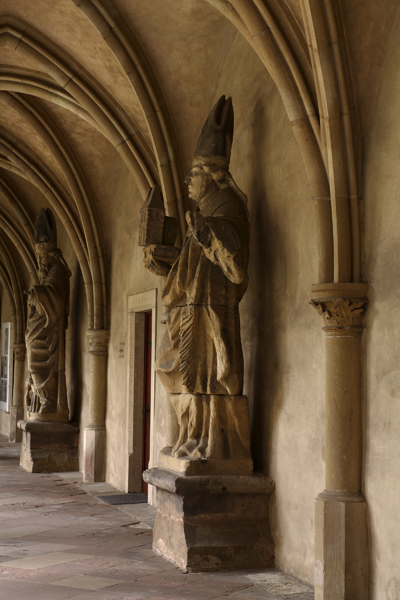
Statues of bishops

=== Bells ===
The cathedral has 10 ringing bells in total hung only in the South Tower. All were cast in 1949 by the Otto bell foundry in Bremen-Hemelingen. The largest bell or bourdon is called "Christus & Helena" and it weighs 8 tons. In Germany, the bells are always numbered from largest to smallest, Bell 1 is always the tenor or bourdon.

5 of the 10 bells work for the clock which play a unique clock chime, each stroke of the 4 bells in order represents a quarter-hour has past; Bell 8 strikes for the quarter-hour, Bell 6 strikes for the half-hour, Bell 7 strikes for the quarter to hour and finally Bell 4 strikes for the hour. After the melody is played, Bell 2 which is the 2nd bourdon chimes the hours.

No.	Name	∅ (mm)	Mass (kg)	Nominal (16th)	Inscription
1	Christ & Helena (Bourdon Bell)	2273	7970	fis ^{0} +7	"To the King of eternity, the immortal, invisible, only God, be praise and glory for ever and ever. Amen. Through Saint Helena, Empress and Patroness of the people of Trier. So that this may happen, I ring the bell. O King of Glory, Christ come with your peace. It is better to put one's trust in the Lord than to put one's trust in man; it is better to trust in the Lord than in princes."
2	Maria (2nd Bourdon Bell)	1911	4480	a0 +2	"I raise my voice in honor of the Queen of Peace, who was immaculately conceived and assumed into heaven. Protect the people of Trier and the city. The king will not conquer with a large army, and the belligerent will not save himself with great power."
3	Peter	1707	3500	h0 +1	"Peter, the key-bearer of the kingdom, protect this temple which is dedicated to him. He who stands under the protection of the Most High, he who dwells in the shadow of the Almighty, can say to the Lord, You are my refuge, my fortress, my God, in You I trust."
4	Eucharius, Valerius & Maternus	1524	2600	cis ^{1} +4	"I am dedicated to Eucharius, Valerius, and Maternus. I urge you to imitate your fathers and remember the deeds they did. How beautiful on the mountains are the feet of him who brings good news, who proclaims peace and brings glad tidings."
5	Matthias	1438	2060	d1 +2	"O Matthias, patron of the diocese of Trier, who has become a partaker of the apostolic dignity, obtain through your supplications that with you we may praise the King of Glory without end. And the lot fell on Matthias and he was numbered among the eleven apostles."
6	Nicetius	1280	1450	e1 +4	"I proclaim the praise of Saint Nicetius, Bishop of Trier, the restorer of this temple. I ask that he preserve this house, devastated by war and then restored, for as long as the days pass. Lord, hear the prayers and grant that everyone who enters this temple to ask for your favors may enjoy their grant."
7	Agritius	1140	1010	fis ^{1} +3	"And we four little bells join in the praise of our big sisters. Saint Agritius, the first bishop in this cathedral."
8	Maximinus	954	590	a1 +3	"Saint Maximinus, Bishop, great defender of the faith."
9	Paulinus	843	400	h1 +1	"Saint Paulinus, bishop and martyr, bravest defender of the faith."
10	Ambrose	757	280	cis ^{2} −1	"Saint Ambrose, Bishop of Milan, born in Trier."

== See also ==
- Roman Monuments, Cathedral of St. Peter and Church of Our Lady in Trier UNESCO World Heritage Site
- Liebfrauenkirche, Trier
