= Kuno II von Falkenstein =

Archbishop-Elector of Trier

Kuno II
- Archbishop-Elector of Trier
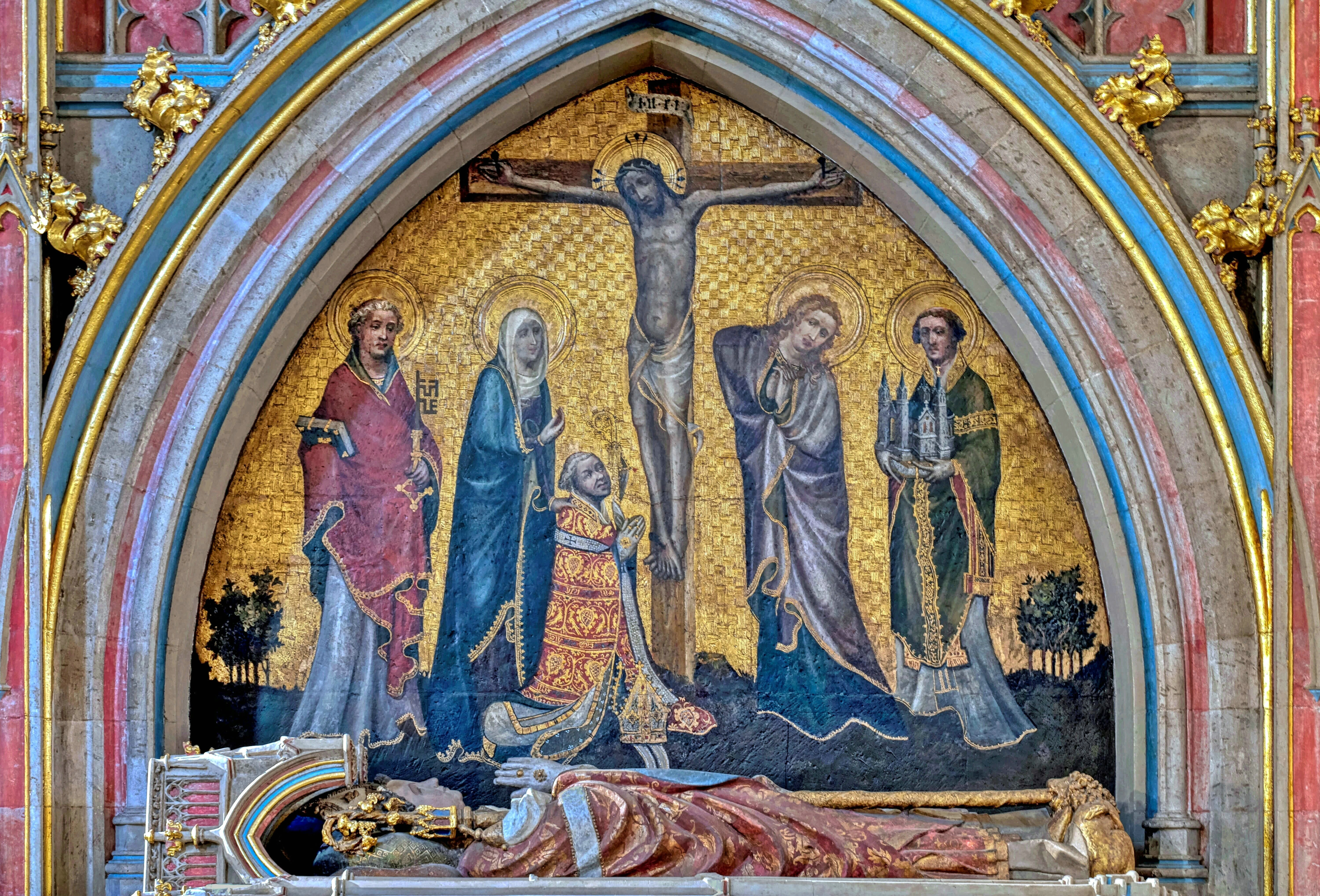
- Tomb in the Basilica of St. Castor in Koblenz
- Church: Catholic Church
- Archdiocese: Trier
- In office: 1362–1388
- Predecessor: Bohemond II
- Successor: Werner von Falkenstein

Personal details
- Born: c. 1320
- Died: 21 May 1388

Kuno II von Falkenstein (c. 1320, Falkenstein Castle – 21 May 1388, Maus Castle), also known as Konrad II von Falkenstein-Münzenberg, was a German nobleman and theologian who served as Archbishop and Elector of Trier from 1362 until his resignation in 1388.

His mother, Johanna von Saarwerden, daughter of Johann I. von Saarwerden (son of Heinrich II. von Saarwerden, son of Ludwig III. von Saarwerden, son of Ludwig I. von Saarwerden, son of Folmar I. Graf von Saarwerden), was born c. 1298, and died c. 1347. About 1313, she married Philipp IV. von Falkenstein, son of Philipp II. von Falkenstein and Gisela von Kyrburg. He was born c. 1269, and died c. 1328.
