= Baldwin of Luxembourg =

Archbishop of Trier

- Archbishop of Trier
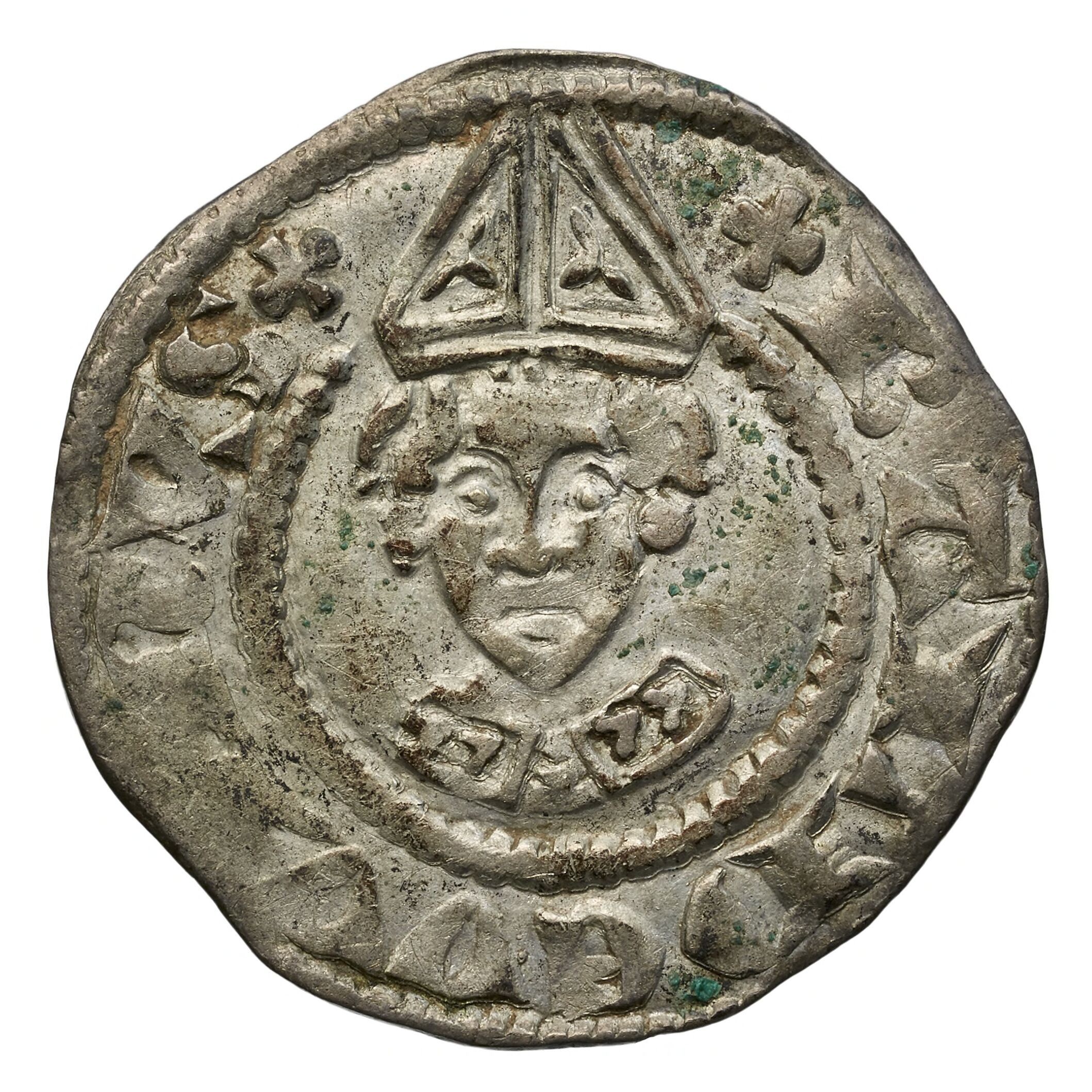
- Coin depicting Baldwin, c. 1307-54
- Church: Catholic Church
- Diocese: Electorate of Trier
- In office: 1307–1354

Personal details
- Born: c. 1285
- Died: 21 January 1354

Baldwin of Luxembourg (c. 1285 – 21 January 1354) was the archbishop and elector of Trier and archchancellor of Burgundy from 1307 to his death. From 1328 to 1336, he was the administrator of the archdiocese of Mainz and from 1331 to 1337 (with interruptions) of the dioceses of Worms and Speyer. He was one of the most prominent German prelates and statesmen of his age, and the most effective ruler of Trier during the late Middle Ages.

== Life ==
Baldwin was born in Luxembourg to Count Henry VI and his wife, Beatrice of Avesnes, Henry died at the Battle of Worringen in 1288.

Baldwin was intended for an ecclesiastic career at an early age. He studied theology and canon law at the University of Paris, for his family was on good terms with the Capetian court of France. He was only twenty-two years of age when elected Archbishop of Trier in 1307. In 1308, he was consecrated bishop by Pope Clement V in Poitiers. He quickly became one of the most influential princes in Germany, influencing the election that year of his brother Henry VII as King and Holy Roman Emperor. From 1310 to 1313, Baldwin accompanied Henry in Italy, where he was crowned emperor in Rome on 29 June 1312.

In the election which followed Henry's early death the next year, Baldwin lent his support to Louis the Bavarian. He later repudiated the Bavarian, however, and moved to support his great-nephew Charles IV in 1346. He was Charles's greatest supporter in the west of the realm.

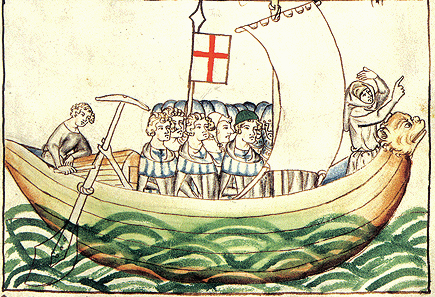
Baldwin on a trip down the Moselle. From the Codex Balduini, 1341.

From 1324 to 1326, he was one of the four lords in the Four Lords' War against Metz. In 1328, he was captured on the Moselle by troops of Loretta of Sponheim, regent for her son, Johann III, Count of Sponheim-Starkenburg, and held at Starkenburg castle. He was only released after a ransom was paid and concessions made. Likewise in that year, he was put forward by his own cathedral chapter as a candidate for the vacant Mainz archdiocese, but the Pope appointed Henry III of Virneburg. Baldwin did govern the archbishopric until the so-called "Mainz Schism" was terminated by the Avignon curia in 1336. During that time period, from 1331 to 1337, Baldwin had as well endeavoured to control the dioceses of Worms and Speyer.

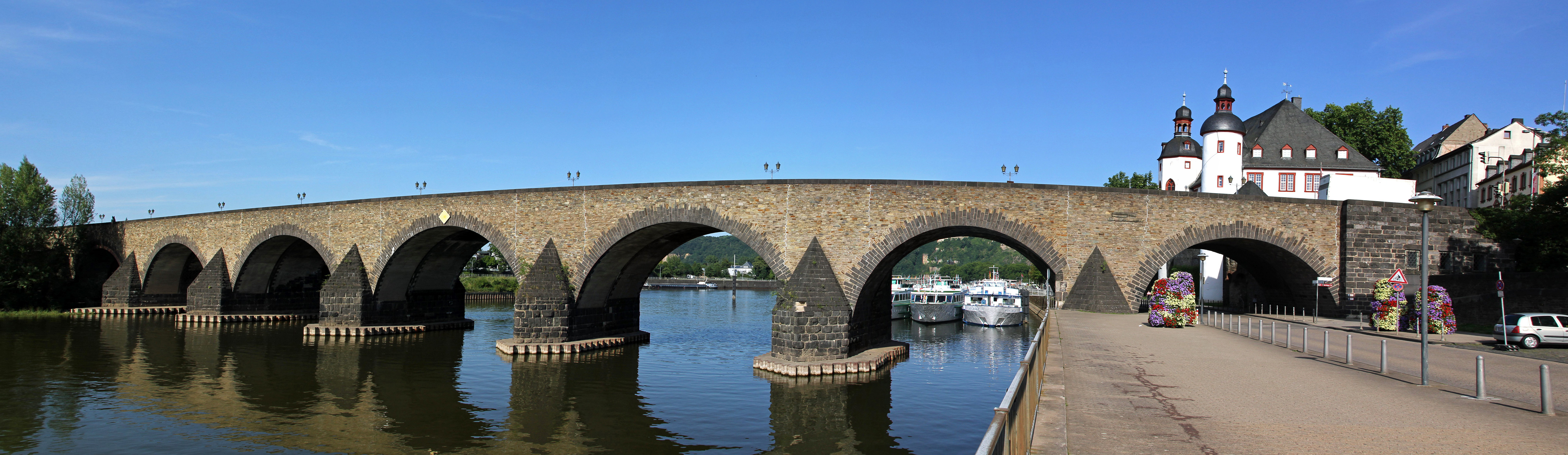
The Balduinbrücke in Koblenz.

Baldwin, like most medieval bishops, was a patron of his see. He built the Balduinbrücke (Baldwin's Bridge) in Koblenz and repaired the old Roman bridge in Trier. He reformed the administration of the archdiocese and preserved official documents. He had many copies made and four manuscript copies of the archives of the diocese survive in the main national archives in Koblenz. Baldwin also strove to connect the various regions of his diocese (Trier and Koblenz). He did not shy away from military methods.

He died in a monastic cell in the local Charterhouse and was buried in the west choir of Trier Cathedral.

== See also ==
- Codex Balduini Trevirensis

== Sources ==
- Heyen, Franz-Josef, ed. (1985). Balduin von Luxemburg: Erzbischof von Trier – Kurfürst des Reiches 1285–1354 (in German). Mainz: Verlag der Gesellschaft für Mittelrheinische Kirchengeschichte.
- Nolden, Reiner, ed. (2010). Balduin von Luxemburg: Erzbischof und Kurfürst von Trier (1308–1354) (in German). Trier: Stadtarchiv. ISBN 978-3-00-032031-6.

Baldwin of Luxembourg House of Luxembourg Born: around 1285 in Luxembourg Died: 21 January 1354 in Trier
Catholic Church titles
Regnal titles
| Preceded by Diether of Nassau | Archbishop- Elector of Trier; 1307–1354 | Succeeded by Bohemond of Saarbrücken |
| Preceded by Eberwin von Kronenberg | Diocesan administrator of the Bishopric of Worms; 1309–1310 | Succeeded by Emmerich von Schöneck |
| Preceded by Matthias von Bucheck | Diocesan administrator of the Archbishopric of Mainz; 1328–1337 | Succeeded by Henry III of Virneburg |
| Preceded by Walram of Veldenz | Diocesan administrator of the Bishopric of Speyer; 1332–1336 | Succeeded by Gerhard of Ehrenberg |
