= Pelicon =

Clothing worn in France

Pelicon was fur-lined piece of clothing worn between a chemise and cotte in France. The fashion dates from the Byzantine, Romanesque and Renaissance era.
