= Balduinea =

14th-century manuscripts

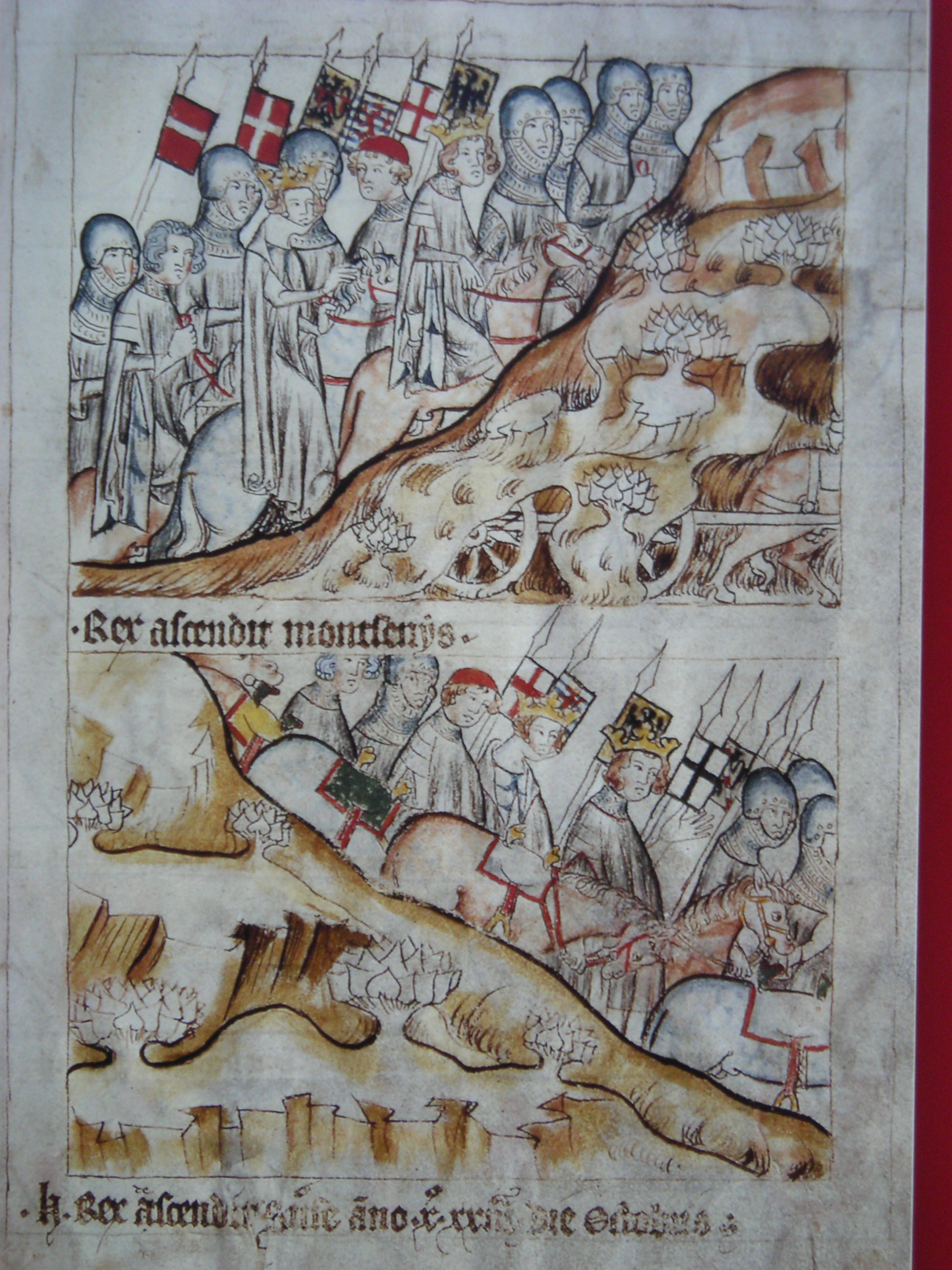
Henry VII crossing the Alps. Baldwin is depicted with a red cap under the banners of Trier and Luxembourg, riding between King Henry (under the eagle standard) and Queen Margaret. Also shown are the banners of Blankenheim, Savoy and Austria (on the ascent), and of the Teutonic Knights and of Henry of Flanders (on the descent).

The Balduinea (German: Balduineen, singular Balduineum) are a set of four cartulary manuscripts created for Archbishop Baldwin of Trier (r. 1308–1354). The compilation of the cartulary and its copying is the subject of a brief proemium. Its purpose was to record in one place all the secular legal privileges and titles of the archdiocese of Trier. The four are conventionally numbered:

- Balduineum I, the copy belonging to the archiepiscopal treasury
- Balduineum II, the copy belonging to the archive of the cathedral chapter
- Balduineum III, the personal copy of the archbishop intended to travel with him
- Balduineum IV, the original and fullest manuscript and the ultimate source for the others

According to the Balduinea's editor, Johannes Mötsch, the collection of material began in the 1330s. Balduineum IV is the comprehensive result, containing copies of 2,239 documents. Through intermediate stages, Balduinea I–III were produced by removing most of the temporalia (documents of temporary significance) and leaving only the perpetualia (documents of permanent significance). Balduineum I, for example, contains only 1,212 documents. These three manuscripts were completed only after 1350. Across all four cartularies, there are 2,256 documents. These can mostly be checked against the originals.

Balduineum I is the most famous of the four copies. Like Balduinea II and III, it is kept in the state archive of Rhineland-Palatinate at Koblenz (where it is MS 1 C 1). Also known as the Codex Balduini Trevirensis (or Codex Balduineus), it includes 37 parchment leaves with a cycle of 73 annotated illustrations depicting the Romzug of the late emperor Henry VII, Baldwin's brother. The anonymous artist may well have been a participant in the campaign, although the illustrations were executed in Germany. It contains the oldest illustration of the Electoral College of the empire.

== Gallery ==
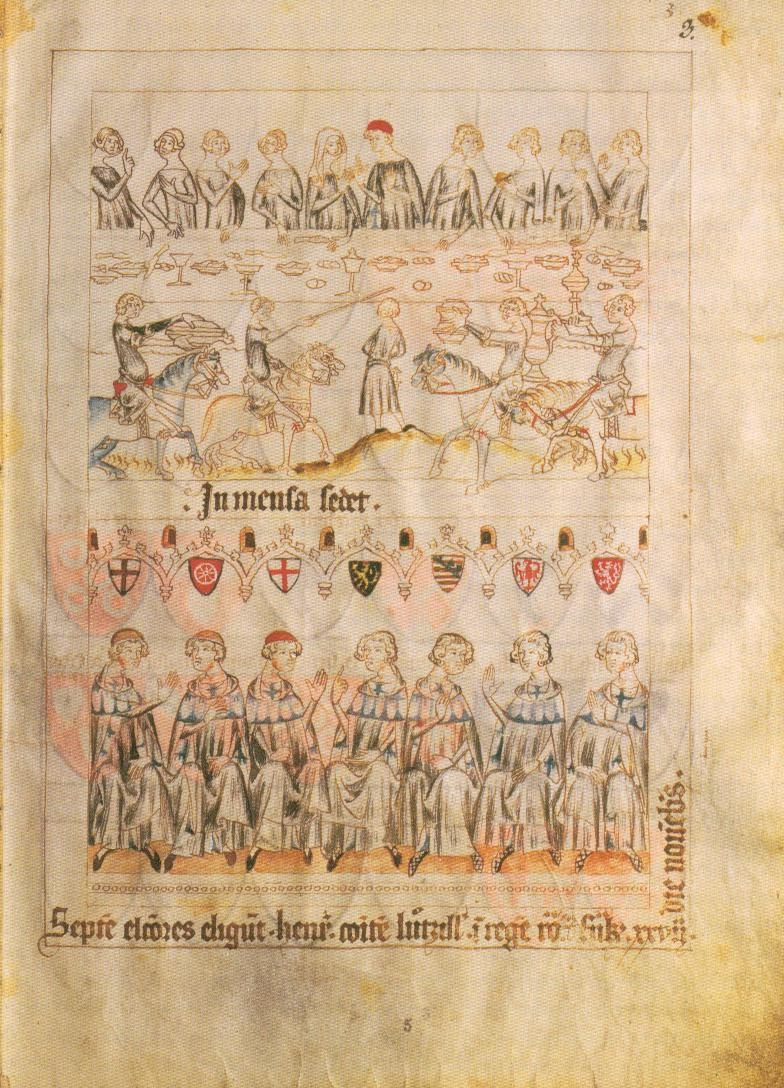
Election of Henry

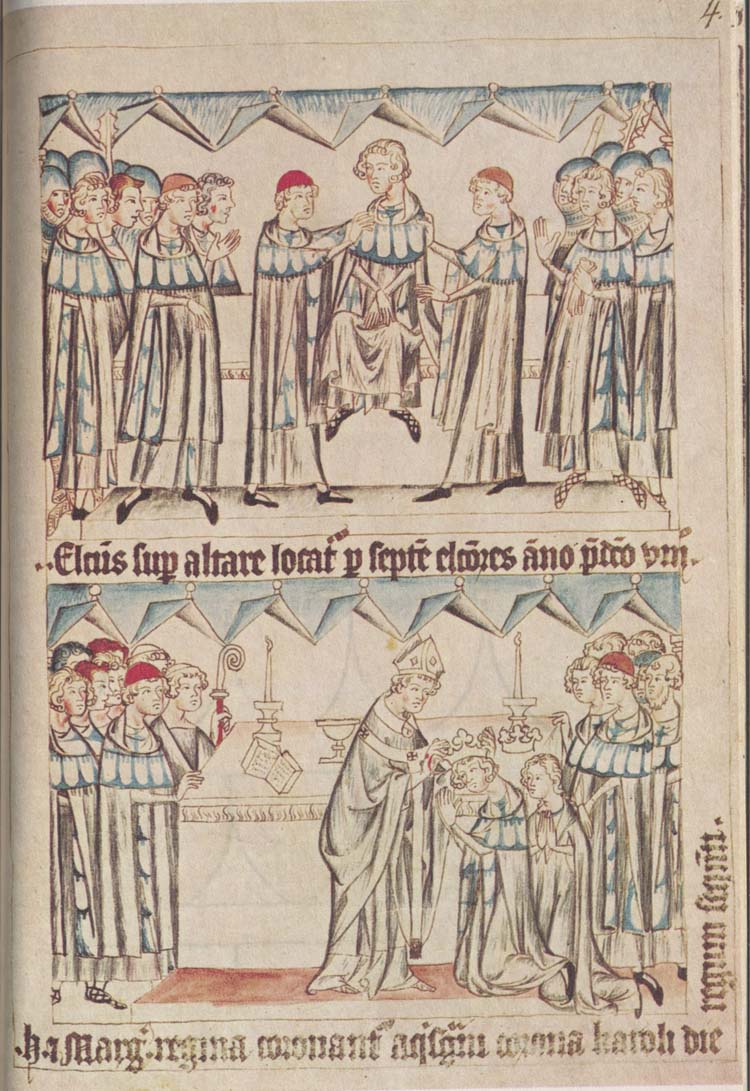
Henry's royal coronation in Aachen

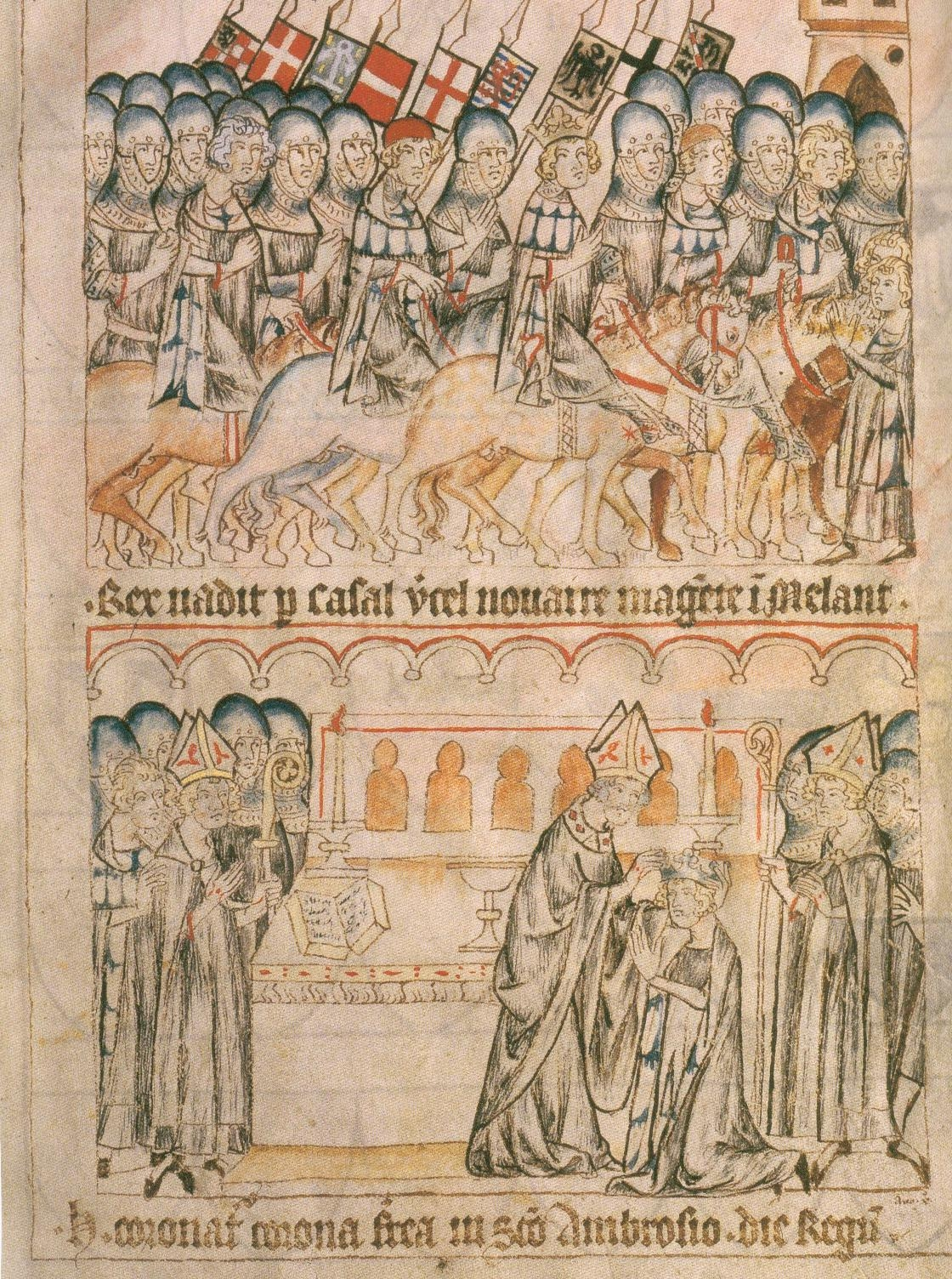
Henry's royal coronation in Milan

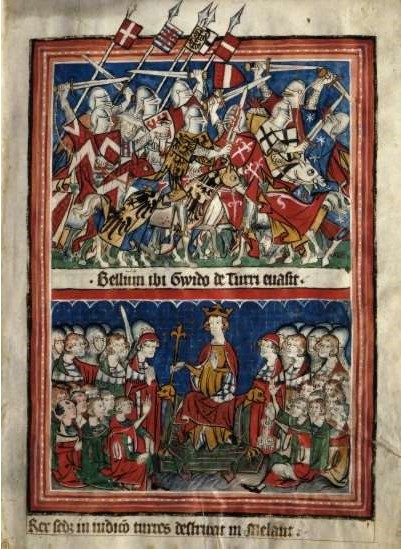
Milan uprising and judgement of Guido della Torre

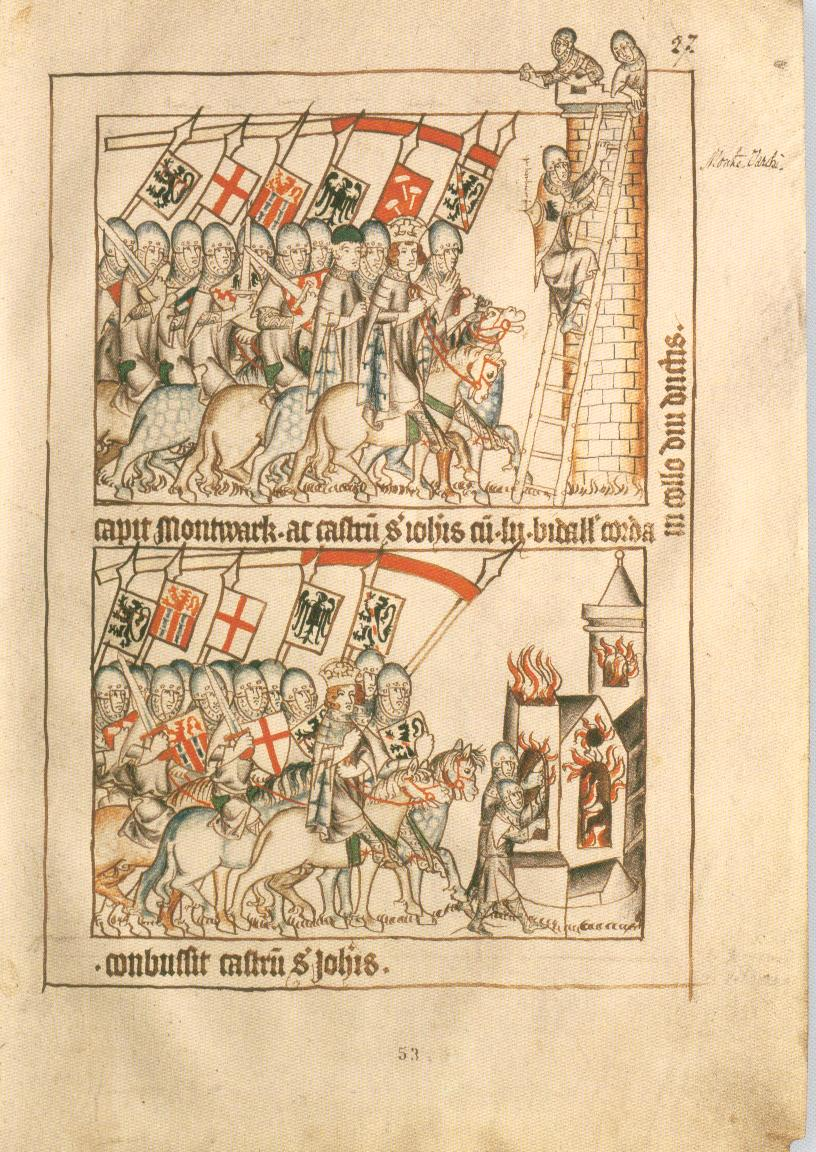
War against Florence

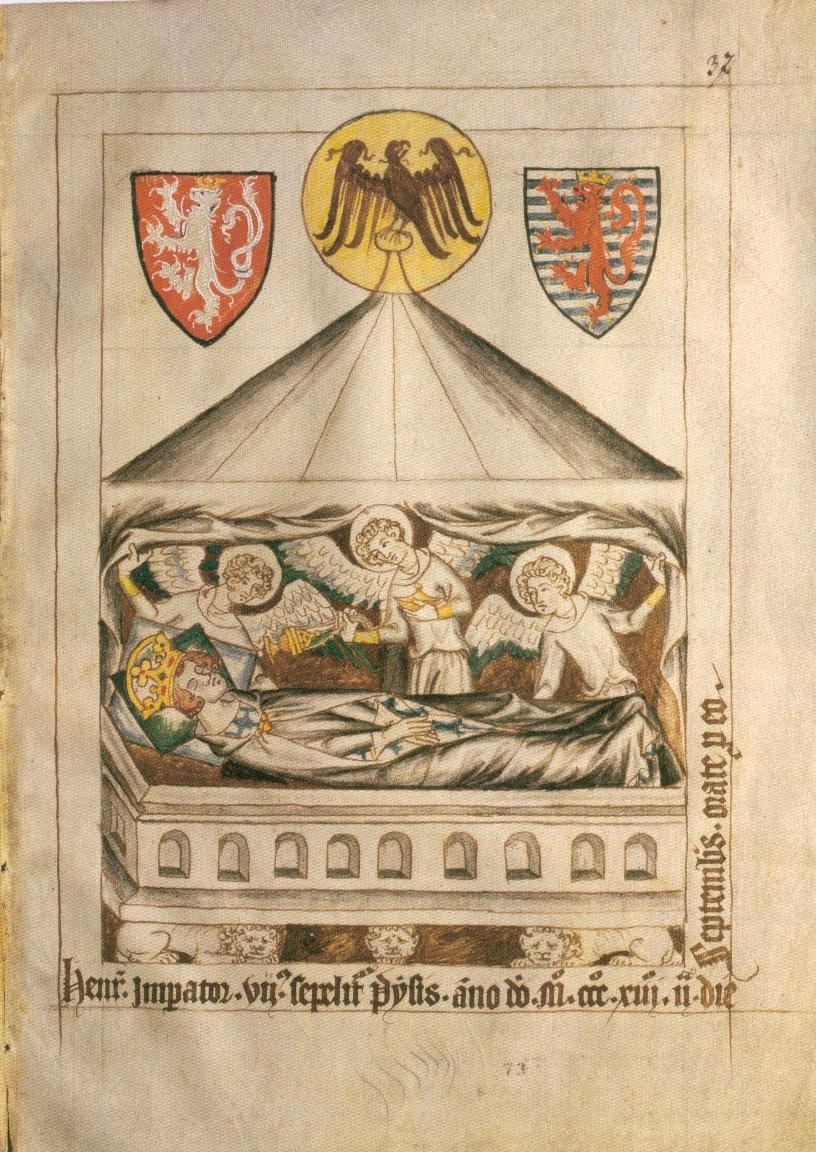
Death of Henry VII

== Editions ==
- Mötsch, Johannes. Die Bladuineen: Aufbau, Entstehung und Inhalt der Urkundensammlung des Erzbischofs Balduin von Trier. Koblens, 1980.
