= Bohemond II (archbishop of Trier) =

Archbishop-Elector of Trier

- Archbishop-Elector of Trier
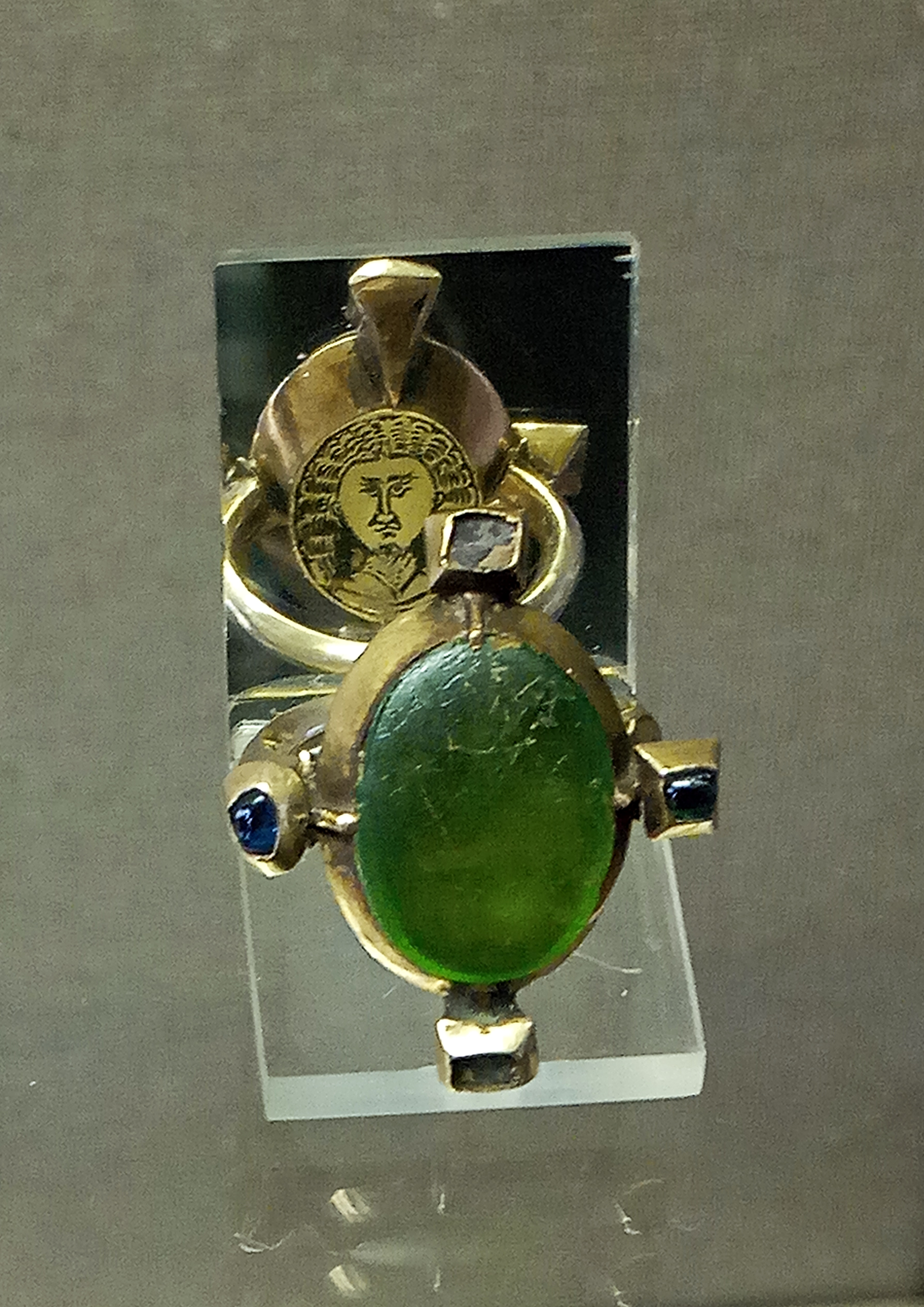
- Bohemond's portrait ring
- Church: Catholic Church
- Archdiocese: Trier
- In office: 1354–1362

Personal details
- Born: c. 1290
- Died: 10 February 1367

Bohemond II of Saarbrücken (c. 1290 – 10 February 1367), also known as Boëmund II von Ettendorf-Warnesberg, was a German theologian who served as Archbishop and Elector of Trier from 6 February 1354 until his resignation in 1362.

Of the Alsatian house of Ettendorf, Bohemond was elected unanimously to succeed Baldwin, Archbishop of Trier, on the latter's death in 1354. He was confirmed by Pope Innocent VI on 2 May. He was of an advanced age and devoted to governing his diocese in peace. Governing in the wake of Baldwin seemed to favour him in this. He made treaties with Gerlach of Mainz, William of Cologne, and the Elector Palatine Rupert I.

He began the construction of Burg Maus in 1356.

Feudal infighting weakened him considerably, however, and, on 4 April, he resigned his see in favour of his coadjutor Kuno II of Falkenstein, with papal permission. He died at Saarburg and was buried in Trier Cathedral. He was loved by the people and affectionately called "White Smocks" for the white overcoat he often wore.

== See also ==
- Gesta Trevirorum

Bohemond of Saarbrücken Born: c. 1290 Died: 10 February 1367
Catholic Church titles
Regnal titles
Preceded by Baldwin of Luxembourg	Archbishop-Elector of Trier as Bohemond II; 1354–1362	Succeeded by Kuno II von Falkenstein
