= John II of Sponheim-Starkenburg =

German nobleman

John II of Sponheim (born between 1265 and 1270; died 22 February or 29 March 1324) at Starkenburg was a German nobleman from the house of Sponheim. He was count of Sponheim from 1289 to 1324. He succeeded his father, Henry I, Count of Sponheim-Starkenburg.

His son was Henry II of Sponheim-Starkenburg died before him (before 1323). John II was succeeded by his grandson, John III, Count of Sponheim-Starkenburg.
