= Stephen I of Sponheim =

Stephen I, Count of Sponheim (d. ca. 1080) is the patriarch of the Rhenish branch of the House of Sponheim, which ruled over the County of Sponheim. He was closely related to Siegfried I, Count of Sponheim, patriarch of the Carinthian Sponheimish branch, but the exact relationship between the two dynasts is disputed. Johannes Trithemius credits a Count Eberhard of Sponheim as founder of the Abbey of Sponheim and dates the founding to 1044, a position questioned by Johannes Mötsch. The Genealogia Sponhemica presents Count Eberhardus as son of Countess Hedwig and father of a single Count Stephenus I/II of Sponheim (). Donald C. Jackman considers Stephen I a son of Siegfried I. Both Jackman and Josef Heinzelmann consider Stephen as being identical to Stephen, Vogt of Worms documented with his brother Markward in 1068. Heinzelmann however casts doubt on a male lineage relationship of Stephen and Siegfried and sees Stephen I of Sponheim as being Lord of Sponheim but not a Count, notices that Stephen I of Sponheim is documented in 1075 as "S(igna) Stepheni de Spanheim" with his seal in a document of Udo, Archbishop of Trier, and proposes Stephen to have married into the House of Sponheim. In another work Heinzelmann considers the Stephen mentioned in 1075 to be Stephen II, or maybe a single Stephen, mentions a Mainzer ministerialis Stephen, the son of Embricho (Emich) and nephew of Archbishop Ruthard, who lived later, as a possible relation, and puts forward that the documented Stephen and Markward belong to the House of the Counts of Metz/Lunéville, which later provided the Vogts of Worms:

"Identisch kann er sein mit einem Wormser Vogt Stephen (1068) [239 UB Stadt Worms I, Nr. 55], der mit seinem Bruder Markwart zu den Grafen von Lunéville/Metz zu gehören scheint, die mit den de Meti später die Wormser Vögte stellen."

Stephen I's wife is supposed to have been a sister of Count Berthold IV of Stromberg. The Berthold-Bezelin dynasty in Stromberg and its relation to the original Berthold-Bezelin dynasty of Trechirgau is discussed by Heinzelmann, which proposes Berthold of Stromberg to be an Emichone with a maternal heritage of the Bertholde/Bezeline from Trechirgau.

He was succeeded by his son, Stephan II, Count of Sponheim.

== Literature ==
- Trithemius, Johannes. Chronicon Sponheimense, ca. 1495-1509 - Chronik des Klosters Sponheim, 1024-1509; Eigenverlag Carl Velten, Bad Kreuznach 1969 (German)
- (in German) Genealogia Sponhemica. Archiv für rheinische Geschichte Coblenz, 1.1833 - 2.1835. Zweiter Teil 1835. http://www.dilibri.de/rlb/periodical/pageview/27862
- Jackman, Donald C. Sponheim. Medieval German Counties. Medieval Prosopography. https://web.archive.org/web/20040205173219/http://www.personal.psu.edu/users/d/c/dcj121/prosop/counts/countyA/county11.htm
- Jackman, Donald C.. Stromburg. Medieval German Counties. Medieval Prosopography. http://www.enlaplage.com/prosop/counts/countyA/county85.htm
- (in Latin and German) Urkundenbuch der Grafschaft Sponheim. Archiv für rheinische Geschichte Coblenz, 1.1833 - 2.1835. Zweiter Teil 1835. http://www.dilibri.de/rlb/periodical/pageview/27863
- (in German) Mitteilungen der Residenzen-Kommission der Akademie der Wissenschaften zu Göttingen, Heft 16/1, 2006. http://resikom.adw-goettingen.gwdg.de/MRK/MRK16-1.htm
- (in German) Heinzelmann, Josef. Spanheimer-Späne—Schachwappen und Konradinererbe. http://www.genealogie-mittelalter.de/heinzelmann_josef/spanheimer_spaene.html
- (in German) Heinzelmann, Josef. Hildegard von Bingen und ihre Verwandten—Genealogische Anmerkungen. http://www.genealogie-mittelalter.de/heinzelmann_josef/hildegard_von_bingen.html
- (in German) Heinzelmann, Josef. Die Spanheimer als Besitznachfolger des Dux Cuno de Beckilinheim. http://www.regionalgeschichte.net/fileadmin/Mittelrheinportal/Teilnehmer/burckhardt/Spanheimer_Besitz.pdf

Preceded by:	Stephen I	Succeeded by:
Siegfried I	Count of Sponheim ?–ca. 1080	Stephen II
