= Oberstreit =

- Municipality
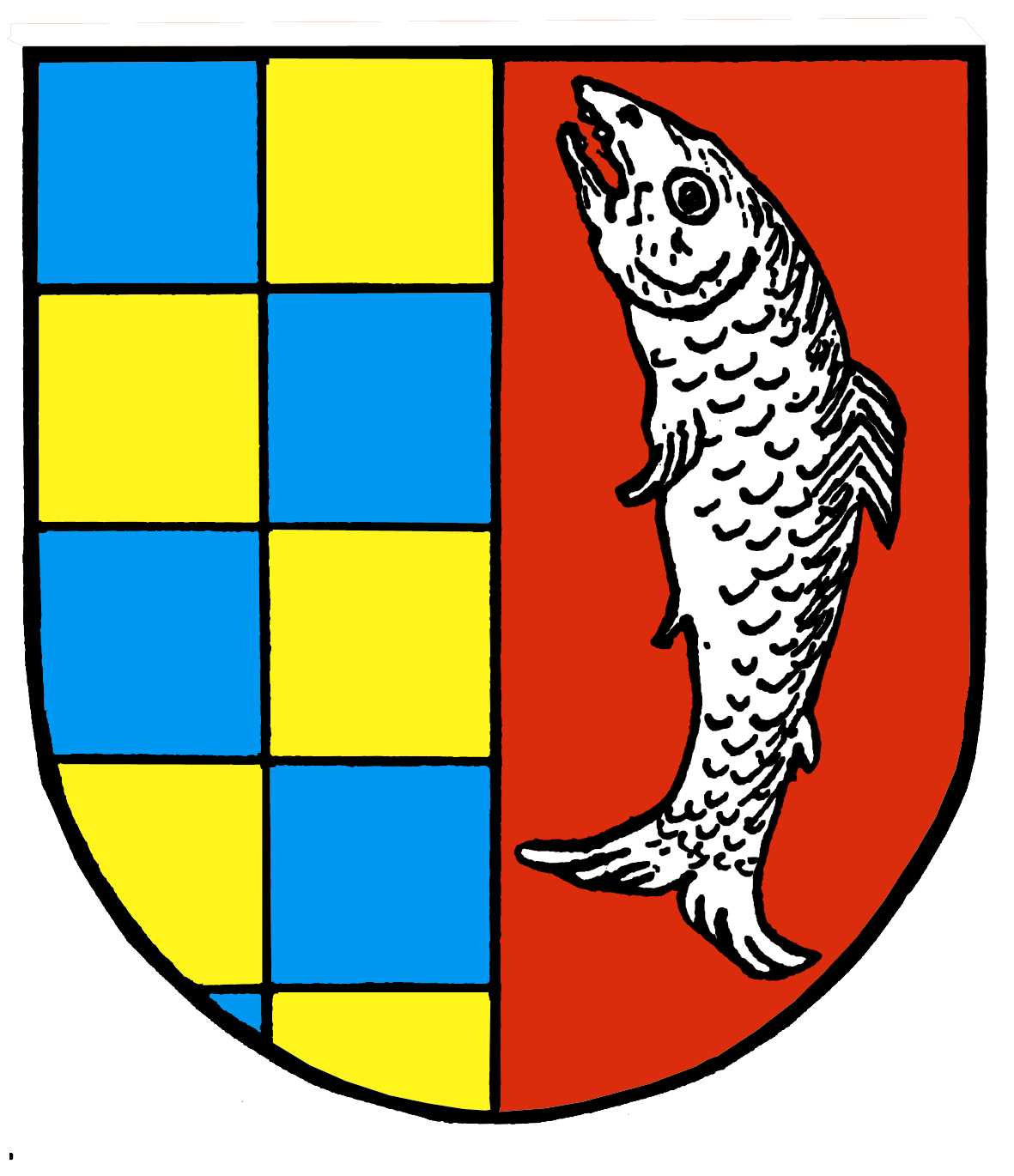
- Coat of arms

- Location of Oberstreit within Bad Kreuznach district
- Interactive map of Oberstreit
- Location within Germany Location within Rhineland-Palatinate
- Coordinates: 49°47′46″N 7°41′38″E
- Country: Germany
- State: Rhineland-Palatinate
- District: Bad Kreuznach
- Municipal assoc.: Rüdesheim

Government
  - Mayor (2019–24): Rudolf Sutor

Area
  - Total: 1.01 km^{2} (0.39 sq mi)
- Elevation: 200 m (660 ft)

Population (2025-12-31)
  - Total: 274
  - Density: 271/km^{2} (703/sq mi)
- Time zone: UTC+01:00 (CET)
  - Summer (DST): UTC+02:00 (CEST)
- Postal codes: 55596
- Dialling codes: 06758
- Vehicle registration: KH

Oberstreit is an Ortsgemeinde – a municipality belonging to a Verbandsgemeinde, a kind of collective municipality – in the Bad Kreuznach district in Rhineland-Palatinate, Germany. It belongs to the Verbandsgemeinde of Rüdesheim, whose seat is in the municipality of Rüdesheim an der Nahe.

== Geography ==
=== Location ===
Oberstreit lies north of the River Nahe east of Bad Sobernheim and just north of the former Disibodenberg Abbey at an elevation of 200 m above sea level. The municipal area measures 1.01 km².

=== Neighbouring municipalities ===
Clockwise from the north, Oberstreit's neighbours are the municipalities of Waldböckelheim, Boos and Staudernheim, all of which likewise lie within the Bad Kreuznach district.

== History ==
Oberstreit's history goes back to Roman times. Oberstreit is believed to have formerly been only a Meierhof. On 23 October 1305, Oberstreit was first mentioned in a document issued by Abbot Werner of Disibodenberg as Ebenstryt, describing it as a Hof (“estate” or “farm”) lying roughly three fourths of an hour from Sobernheim, whose owner, Jakob von Ebenstrit, transferred ownership as a donation to Disibodenberg Abbey. Otherwise, little is known about Oberstreit's history. It was established on an old road coming up from the Nahe and leading to Bockenau and was divided like Boos and Steinhardt (today an outlying centre of Bad Sobernheim): the northeast half belonged to the greater municipal area of Böckelheim, while the southwest half belonged to that of Sobernheim-Disibodenberg-Odernheim. The village's name, “Oberstreit”, is interpreted as Obere Strut, meaning a village on boggy ground (at a small brook) in a hollow, with the prefix indicating the upper of two such villages. The lower one (Niedere Strut) would then by Boos. It is likely that there was a lot of woodland hereabouts that was later cleared. When the first farm was established here is unknown. In line with the division mentioned above, the two halves were ruled, like Boos, by either the Salians and later the Counts of Sponheim in the case of the northeast half or by an Archbishopric of Mainz holding in the case of the southwest half. The latter passed in 1471 to Electoral Palatinate, which then took the whole Böckelheim Complex over from the Bishop of Mainz and Louis I, Count Palatine of Zweibrücken. The Christians were parochially united with Staudernheim and Waldböckelheim. Records from 1491 mention both a chapel and a “chaplaincy” (building, roughly a rectory). The chapel was consecrated to Saint Bartholomew and stood near what is today the graveyard. It may well have been a pilgrimage hub. In 1714, the dispute between the Electorate of Mainz and Electoral Palatinate over Böckelheim and its appurtenances that had been simmering for decades was settled. Henceforth, Oberstreit was to belong wholly to the Unteramt of Böckelheim in the Oberamt of Kreuznach. A few holdings were nevertheless granted to the Counts of Nassau-Saarbrücken. Furthermore, there were properties held by the Counts of Degenfeld, as in Boos. After the conquest and takeover of the land by French Revolutionary troops, there came an administrative reform in January 1798 that swept all the foregoing feudal administrative bodies aside. Belonging thereafter to the new mairie (“mayoralty”) were the villages of Sobernheim (seat), Waldböckelheim, Thalböckelheim, Schloßböckelheim, Steinhardt (in its two parts), Oberstreit, Boos, Bockenau, Sponheim and Burgsponheim. On 28 May 1815, as a result of agreements reached at the Congress of Vienna, the Nahe region passed to the Kingdom of Prussia, which retained they system of French mairies, although they were thereafter known by the German word Bürgermeistereien. As of 14 May 1816, Oberstreit belonged to the new Kreuznach district, whose population at that time numbered all together 4,928; the village of Sobernheim had 1,948, Bockenau 577, Boos 279, Burgsponheim 201, Oberstreit 138, Sponheim 539, Thalböckelheim 238 and Waldböckelheim 1,008. In 1888, Sobernheim, which since 1857/1858 had once more been a town, was split away from the Bürgermeisterei, whose seat was then moved to Waldböckelheim. The Evangelical church was built in the village's west end in 1959, while the Catholics had built their own chapel in 1956/1957. Today, Oberstreit belongs to the Verbandsgemeinde of Rüdesheim.

=== Population development ===
Oberstreit's population development since Napoleonic times is shown in the table below. The figures for the years from 1871 to 1987 are drawn from census data:

Year	Inhabitants
1815	149
1835	227
1871	217
1905	193
1939	246

Year	Inhabitants
1950	241
1961	216
1970	217
1987	237
2005	262

At the census conducted on 1 December 1885, the census takers counted, according to the school chronicle, 190 inhabitants. These broke down as follows:

- Sex: 98 male; 92 female
- Religion: 152 Catholic; 36 Evangelical; 3 Jewish
- Occupation: 25 bricklayers and stonemasons; 3 day labourers; 15 cropraisers; 7 menservants; 5 maidservants; 8 female persons working at the Sobernheim rope factory; 1 schoolteacher; 1 blacksmith; 3 innkeepers; 1 wainwright; 1 police officer; 2 seamstresses; 1 tradesman (thus, even in the late 19th century, 16% of Oberstreit's female population also sought work outside the home)
- Livestock ownership: 10 horses; 114 head of cattle; 57 pigs; 41 goats

== Religion ==
As at 30 November 2013, there are 274 full-time residents in Oberstreit, and of those, 104 are Evangelical (37.956%), 143 are Catholic (52.19%), 7 (2.555%) belong to other religious groups and 20 (7.299%) either have no religion or will not reveal their religious affiliation.

== Politics ==
=== Municipal council ===
The council is made up of 6 council members, who were elected by majority vote at the municipal election held on 7 June 2009, and the honorary mayor as chairman.

=== Mayor ===
Oberstreit's mayor is Rudolf Sutor.

=== Coat of arms ===
The municipality's arms might be described thus: Per pale countercompony azure and Or and gules a salmon palewise argent.

In the Middle Ages, Oberstreit was divided between two lordships, and this is reflected in the coat of arms. The “countercompony” pattern (two chequered rows) on the dexter (armsbearer's right, viewer's left) side are a reference to (half) the village's former allegiance to the Counts of Sponheim, while the charge on the sinister (armsbearer's left, viewer's right) side, the fish, is a reference to the other half's former allegiance to the Counts of Salm, Salm being a German word for “salmon”.

== Culture and sightseeing ==
=== Buildings ===
The following are listed buildings or sites in Rhineland-Palatinate’s Directory of Cultural Monuments:

- Catholic Church, Kirchstraße – aisleless church with Baroque elements, later Heimatstil, about 1952–1955
- Eichgraben 2 – former school; small one- and two-floor group of buildings, sandstone-block, 1848, conversion and expansion in 1892
- At Hauptstraße 10 – armorial stone, marked 1604

=== Regular events ===
The Oberstreiter-Markt – despite its name, actually a fair – is held each year on the second weekend in September, and is widely known. The Oberstreiter-Markt had its first documentary mention in 1570. Then standing at what is now the graveyard was a chapel consecrated to Saint Bartholomew. Electoral Palatinate established a market here so that inhabitants of the Amt of Böckelheim could buy a variety of useful articles. Also tied in with this event were folk plays and merrymaking in the form of dancing. The market could only be opened once an officer, leading a squad of soldiers, had tasted the wine to be given out at the event and deemed it to be the genuine article. As early as the 17th century, the hustle and bustle at the Oberstreiter-Markt had got so far out of hand, thereby rousing God in heaven to wrath and retribution that the Oberamtmann of Böckelheim felt constrained to impose a strict ban. On 24 August 1687, Oberamtmann Pawal von Ramlingen issued an order that anybody caught at the Oberstreiter-Markt dancing, gorging himself, guzzling wine or taking part in a brawl would either be locked up in the tower for eight days or have to pay a fine of 10 Rhenish guilders. It was no use, though. Even though the weather was bad, ten thousand visitors attended the market that year. In 1772, there was a murder at the market. The man who was killed was an Electoral Palatinate soldier, and his death was the culmination of an argument between some Electoral Palatinate people and some others representing the House of Salm. In 1787, the notorious outlaw Schinderhannes (or Johannes Bückler, to use his true name) showed up at the market to cause trouble. He and his gang did no Oberstreiter any harm, only striking some French soldiers who had come from the Sponheim domain to Oberstreit to dance. These incidents are without a doubt traceable to the fiery Oberstreit wine. As late as the 1940s, the Oberstreiter-Markt was still one of the biggest folk festivals on the Middle Nahe. There were always several marquees, and on the last day of the market, a livestock market was held attended by the farmers and livestock dealers from throughout the surrounding area. The fair is not quite as grand now, but it is still held.

=== Clubs ===
The following clubs are active in Oberstreit:

- Turn und Sportverein Oberstreit — gymnastic and sport club
- Freiwillige Feuerwehr Oberstreit — volunteer fire brigade
- Oberstreiter Jugend — youth club
- Senioren-Treff — seniors’ club

== Economy and infrastructure ==
=== Transport ===
Running through the village is Landesstraße 234, leading northeast to neighbouring Waldböckelheim where it meets Landesstraße 108 and Bundesstraße 41, which itself leads to both Bad Sobernheim and the district seat, Bad Kreuznach. Landesstraße 234 also leads southwards to neighbouring Staudernheim, which is served by a railway station on the Nahe Valley Railway (Bingen–Saarbrücken), which also offers direct connections to Mainz and Frankfurt am Main. Three kilometres north of the village lies the Bad Sobernheim-Domberg recreational airfield.

=== Established businesses ===
There are today in the municipality organic winegrowing, an automotive workshop and a country inn with adjoining guesthouse. Also found in the village are a sound studio and a series of small businesses in the service sector.
