= Rabenstein Castle (Carinthia) =

Castle ruin in Austria

- Carinthia, Austria
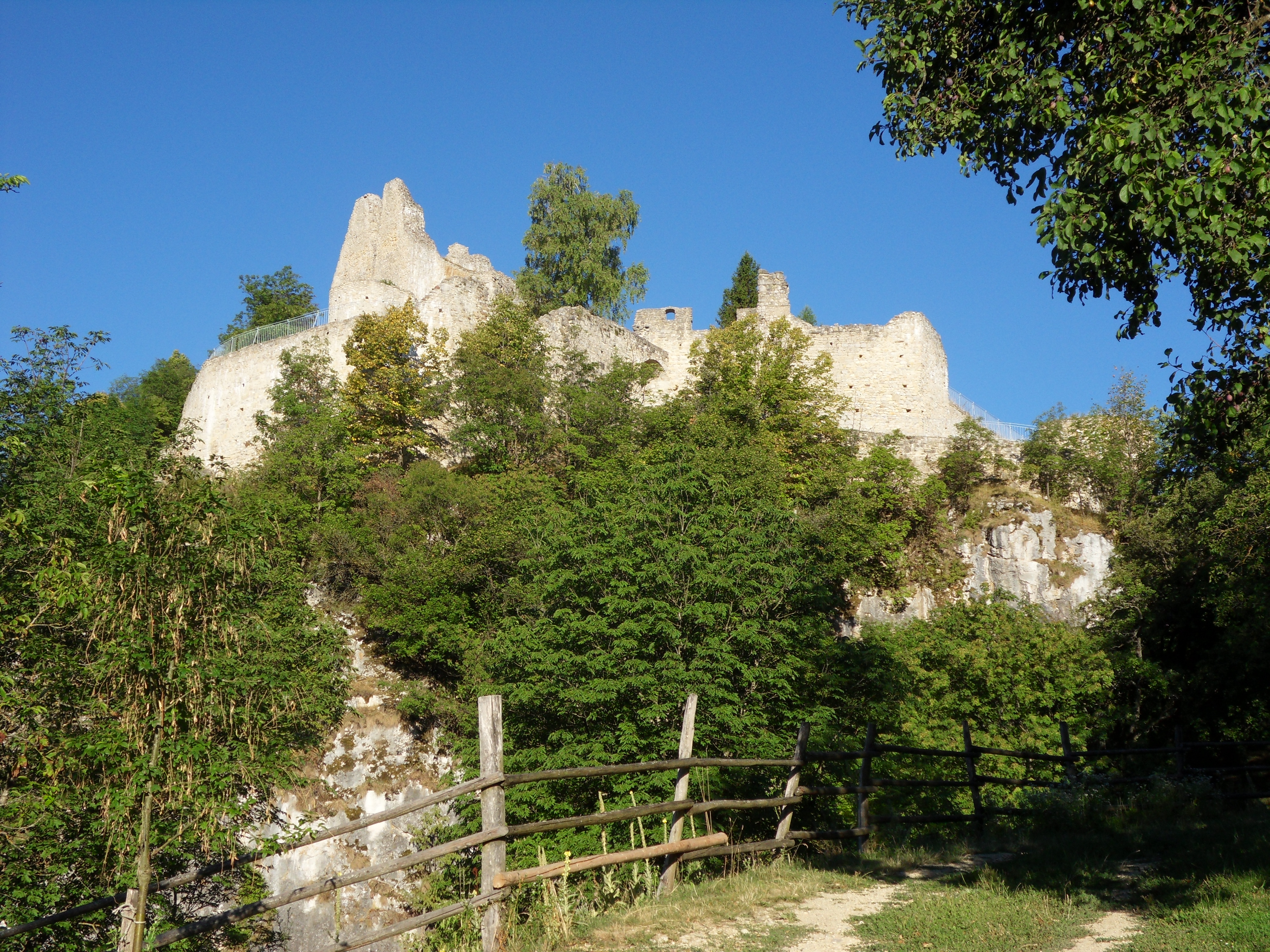

Site information
- Type: Rock castle (Felsenburg)
- Owner: Private
- Condition: Ruin

Location
- Coordinates: 46°41′19″N 14°52′20″E
- Height: 691 meters

Site history
- Built: 1100
- Built by: Engelbert I von Sponheim
- In use: 1100 – 19th century

Rabenstein Castle (German: Burgruine Rabenstein) is a ruined rock castle in Carinthia, Austria. The castle is 691 meters (2,267 ft) above sea level. Rabenstein Castle was built around 1100 to protect nearby Sankt Paul im Lavanttal.

== History ==
Rabenstein Castle began as a mere watchtower built on a tall hill. Rabenstein became a castle when Engelbert I Sponheim, Margrave of Istria founded St. Paul's Abbey in 1091 in order to protect the abbey and town around it.

The castle was occupied by the Rabensteins (whose name henceforth stuck to the structure) until 1200, and the Archbishop of Salzburg until 1300.

== See also ==
- List of castles in Austria
- Saint Paul's Abbey, Lavanttal
