= Siegfried I of Sponheim =

Siegfried I
- Margrave of the Hungarian March

Count of Sponheim
- Reign: c. 1044–1065
- Predecessor: Eberhard I
- Successor: Engelbert I
- Born: c. 1010; Sponheim Castle, Nahegau, Rhenish Franconia
- Died: 7 February 1065; Byzantine Bulgaria
- Buried: St. Paul's Abbey
- Noble family: House of Sponheim
- Spouse: Richardis von Sponheim
- Issue: Engelbert I, Margrave of Istria
- Father: Eberhard I von Spanheim
- Mother: Hedwig, Countess of Nellenburg

Siegfried I (c. 1010 – 7 February 1065) is considered the progenitor of the Carinthian ducal House of Sponheim (Spanheimer) and all of its lateral branches, including the Counts of Lebenau and the Counts of Ortenburg. He is documented as Count of Sponheim from 1044 and served as margrave of the Hungarian March in 1045/46 and as count in the Puster Valley and the Lavant Valley from 1048 until his death.

== Descendance ==
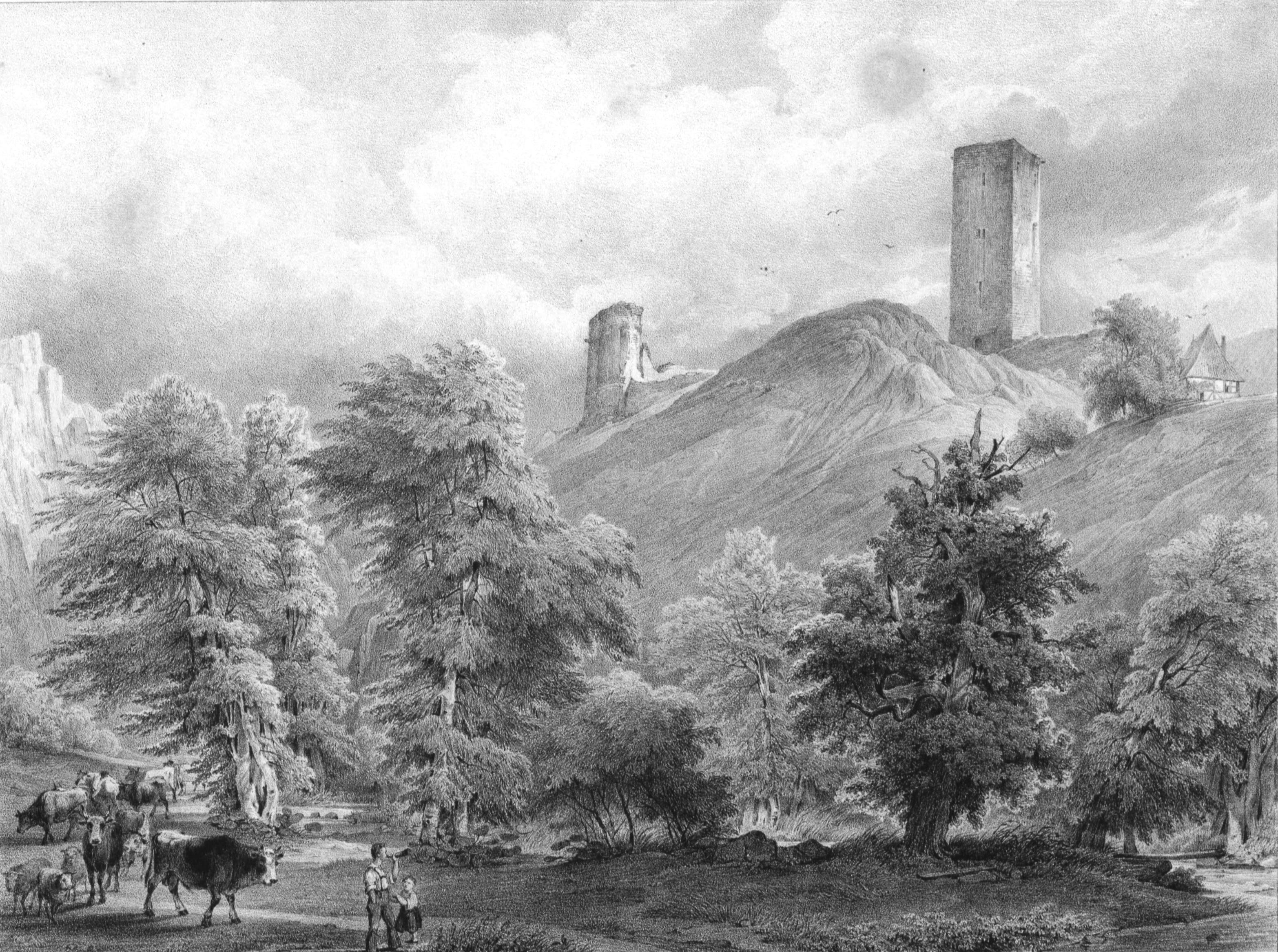
Ruins of Sponheim Castle, 19th century engraving

Siegfried was born at Sponheim Castle in Rhenish Franconia. Likewise Siegfried had a family relationship of unknown degree with Count Stephan I of Sponheim (d. ca. 1080), patriarch of the Rhenish branch of the Sponheim dynasty, which survives as the present-day Princes of Sayn-Wittgenstein.

== Life ==
In 1035 the Salian emperor Conrad II marched against the rebellious Duke Adalbero of Carinthia. In his attendance was Count Siegfried as his close companion, who thus arrived from Rhenish Franconia in the southeastern estates of the German kingdom. Adalbero was deposed and succeeded by the Salian duke Conrad the Younger in 1036.

Siegfried married Richgard, the heiress of Count Engelbert IV in the Puster Valley from the Carinthian family of the Sieghardinger and Aribonids. Through the marriage with Richgard, he obtained large possessions in Tyrol and also in Carinthia, for example the Lavant Valley (in modern Austria) and probably also Laško and some other parts in the March of Carniola (in modern Slovenia) like the territories around Ljubljana.

In the year 1044 he documents as ruling Count at Sponheim. In 1045 King Henry III of Germany granted Siegfried the territory of the Hungarian March at the eastern frontier of the March of Austria as a fiefdom. However, he kept and managed this land only for a short period. The Hungarian March was finally dissolved and incorporated under the rule of the Babenberg margrave Ernest of Austria from 1055.

In 1048 Siegfried documents as a Gaugraf in the Tyrolean Puster Valley and in the Carinthian Lavant Valley; he must therefore have already succeeded to his father-in-law Count Engelbert IV as heir to this territory by then. He overtook likewise the possessions of his father-in-law in the Duchy of Bavaria. Besides he soon held the office of a Vogt (reeve) in the bishoprics of Brixen and Salzburg. Siegfried received likewise possessions in Lower Carinthia and in eastern Upper Bavaria.

In 1064 Siegfried joined the pilgrimage of Archbishop Siegfried I of Mainz to Jerusalem. On his way back, one year later, he died on the transit through Bulgaria. There he was also buried, before his widow Richgard released the corpse and let him be buried in the parish church of Sankt Paul im Lavanttal he had planned and constructed.

In the year 1909 the Siegfriedstrasse in the Floridsdorf district of Vienna was named after him.

== Issue ==
From Siegfried's marriage with Richgard Countess of Lavant Valley several children were born:

- Engelbert I (d. 1096), succeeded his father as Count of Sponheim and Gaugraf in the Puster Valley and Lavant Valley, appointed Margrave of Istria in 1090; married Hadwig, possibly a daughter of the Billung duke Bernard II of Saxony. Father of Engelbert II.
- Siegfried (d. 1070), married ?, supposedly not of equal birth, since there is no direct relationship of the descendants to further Sponheim counts
- Hartwig (d. 1102), Archbishop of Magdeburg from 1079
- Hermann (d. 1118), Burgrave of Magdeburg from 1080

== Literature ==
- (in German) Dotzauer, Winfried: Geschichte des Nahe-Hunsrück-Raumes von den Anfängen bis zur Französischen Revolution. Stuttgart, Franz Steiner Verlag / 2001
- (in German) Fuchs, Walter: Schloss Ortenburg, Ortenburger Baudenkmäler und die Geschichte der Reichsgrafschaft Ortenburg, Ortenburg / 2000
- (in German) Hausmann, Friedrich: Die Grafen zu Ortenburg und ihre Vorfahren im Mannesstamm, die Spanheimer in Kärnten, Sachsen und Bayern, sowie deren Nebenlinien, erschienen in: Ostbairische Grenzmarken - Passauer Jahrbuch für Geschichte Kunst und Volkskunde, Nr. 36, Passau / 1994
- (in German) Hausmann, Friedrich: Siegfried, Markgraf der "Ungarnmark" und die Anfänge der Spanheimer in Kärnten und um Rheinland. In: Jahrbuch für Landeskunde von Niederösterreich, Neue Folge Band 43. Wien 1977, S. 115–168 (pdf, mgh-bibliothek.de)
- (in Slovene) Gruden, Josip: Zgodovina slovenskega naroda. Celovec, Družba sv. Mohorja/ 1910
- (in Slovene) Hauptmann, Ljudmil: Nastanek in razvoj Kranjske. Ljubljana, Slovenska matica / 1999
- (in Slovene) Kos, Milko: Zgodovina Slovencev. Ljubljana, Jugoslovanska knjigarna / 1933
- (in German) Pellender, Heinz: Tambach - vom Langheimer Klosteramt zur Ortenburg'schen Grafschaft - Historie des Gräflichen Hauses Ortenburg, des Klosteramtes und Schlosses Tambach, 2. Auflage Coburg / 1990
- (in German) Ortenburg-Tambach, Dr. Eberhard Graf zu: Geschichte des reichsständischen, herzoglichen und gräflichen Gesamthauses Ortenburg - Teil 1: Das herzogliche Haus in Kärnten., Vilshofen / 1932
- (in Slovene) Vengust, Marko: Kostanjevica na Krki in koroški vojvode Spanheimi. In: Kostanjeviške novice, n. 36. Kostanjevica. p. 23, 2008

== Sources ==
Siegfried I of Sponheim House of Sponheim Born: c. 1010 Died: 7 February 1065
Unknown	Count of Sponheim c. 1044–1065	Succeeded by Engelbert I
Preceded by Liutpold	Margrave of the Hungarian March; 1045–1046	Succeeded by Ernest of Austria
