= Stephen II =

Stephen II may refer to:

- Stephen II of Iberia (died c. 650), prince of Iberia (Kartli, eastern Georgia)
- Pope-elect Stephen (died 752), considered (from the 16th century to 1960) a valid pope under the name Stephen II
- Pope Stephen II (died 757), his successor, called Stephen III until 1961
- Stephen II of Troyes (died 1047)
- Stephen II of Croatia (died 1091), King of Croatia
- Stephen II, Count of Sponheim (died 1096)
- Stephen II of Hungary (1101–1131), King of Hungary and Croatia
- Stephen II, Ban of Bosnia (died 1353), of the House of Kotromanić
- Stephen II, Duke of Bavaria (1319–75)
- Stephen II of Moldavia (died 1447), Prince (Voivode) of Moldavia
