= Engelbert I =

Engelbert I may refer to:

- Engelbert I, Count of Berg (d. 1189)
- Engelbert I, Count of the Mark (d. 1277)
- Engelbert I of Nassau (c. 1370–1380 – 1442)
- Engelbert I, Margrave of Istria (d. 1096)
