= Boos, Bad Kreuznach =

Boos
- Municipality
- Coat of arms

- Location of Boos within Bad Kreuznach district
- Interactive map of Boos
- Location within Germany Location within Rhineland-Palatinate
- Coordinates: 49°47′36″N 7°43′01″E
- Country: Germany
- State: Rhineland-Palatinate
- District: Bad Kreuznach
- Municipal assoc.: Rüdesheim

Government
  - Mayor (2019–24): Sascha Wickert

Area
  - Total: 1.11 km^{2} (0.43 sq mi)
- Elevation: 135 m (443 ft)

Population (2025-12-31)
  - Total: 357
  - Density: 322/km^{2} (833/sq mi)
- Time zone: UTC+01:00 (CET)
  - Summer (DST): UTC+02:00 (CEST)
- Postal codes: 55595
- Dialling codes: 06758
- Vehicle registration: KH

Boos (German pronunciation: [boːs]) is an Ortsgemeinde – a municipality belonging to a Verbandsgemeinde, a kind of collective municipality – in the Bad Kreuznach district in Rhineland-Palatinate, Germany. It belongs to the Verbandsgemeinde of Rüdesheim, whose seat is in the municipality of Rüdesheim an der Nahe. Boos is a winegrowing village.

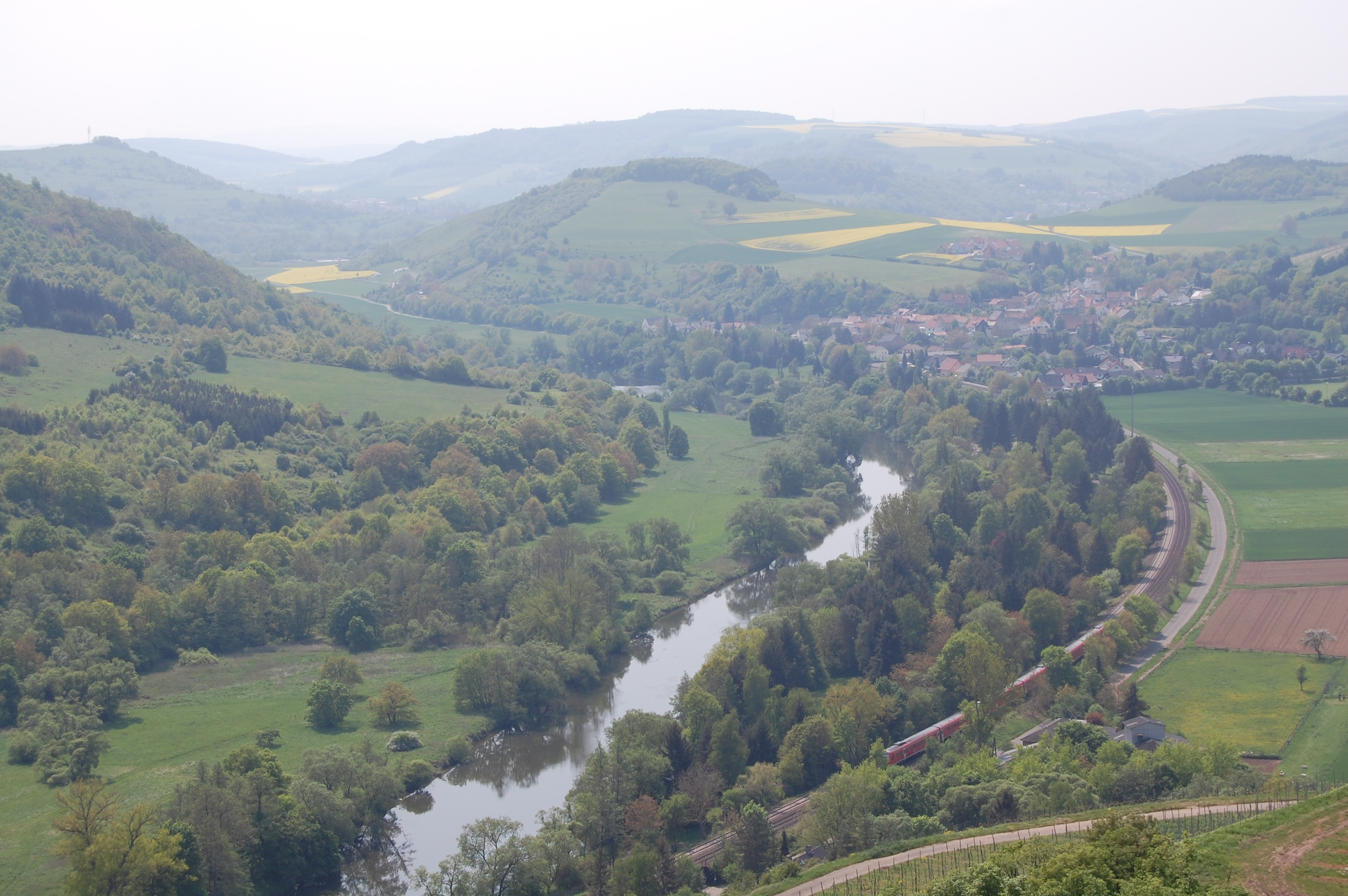
Boos on the Nahe; the Nahe Valley Railway skirts the village

== Geography ==
=== Location ===
Boos lies between the Hunsrück and the North Palatine Uplands on the river Nahe, southeast of Bad Sobernheim. Its elevation is 135 m above sea level and the municipal area measures 1.11 km^{2}.

=== Neighbouring municipalities ===
Clockwise from the north, Boos's neighbours are the municipality of Waldböckelheim, the municipality of Duchroth, the municipality of Staudernheim and the municipality of Oberstreit.

=== Constituent communities ===
Also belonging to Boos is the outlying homestead of Im Käsberg.

== History ==
The village of Boos arose on a flood-free point bar on the Nahe on a low terrace north of that river on a brook. As already witnessed by many archaeological finds from the New Stone Age, the Bronze Age, Celtic times and Roman times, Boos is one of the oldest populated centres in the Nahe region. The greater and more important finds from bygone ages are those from Roman times. Generally known is the Roman villa rustica with its preserved cryptoporticus level. It is a lordly house with two vaulted cellars from the 2nd or 3rd century AD, which since 1990 has been preserved and made accessible to the public. In 1128, Boos had its first documentary mention when one of Disibodenberg Abbey's landholds was confirmed. This estate also included a holding in Boos that Kuno von Böckelheim and his wife, who had been Archbishop of Mainz Willigis’s (995–1011) regents, had donated to their young charge in 976. On this basis, Boos celebrated its one thousandth anniversary (“1000 Jahre Boos”) in 1976. In the Middle Ages, the Vogtei rights had belonged to the Counts Palatine of Zweibrücken, who had inherited them from the Counts of Veldenz. In the 18th century, however, these rights were held jointly by Electoral Palatinate and the Lords of Stein-Kallenfels. Beginning in 1798, Boos belonged to the administrative unit of Sobernheim, which in 1815 passed to the Kingdom of Prussia in 1815, within which it was grouped into the new Bad Kreuznach district the following year. In 1888, Boos passed in the course of administrative reform to the Bürgermeisterei (“Mayoralty”) of Waldböckelheim. Since a further administrative reform in 1970, Boos has belonged to the Verbandsgemeinde of Rüdesheim.

=== Municipality’s name ===
The name “Boos”, according to a mention from about the year 1000, can be explained as a reference to bushland. In this mention, the village is called Boys. Under Archbishop of Mainz Willigis (995–1011), Conrad II, Duke of Carinthia from the noble house of the Salians donated to Disibodenberg Abbey an estate of 20 Morgen of Salian land and two occupied Huben (roughly “oxgangs”) for his late daughter Udo's salvation. On the other hand, Boos's own website suggests another derivation, from the archaic word bozen, which meant “hit” or “strike”. The basis for believing this is that on the slopes northwest of the village were once found many sandstone quarries, where of course stone was struck with hammers or pickaxes.

== Religion ==
As at 31 August 2013, there are 372 full-time residents in Boos, and of those, 232 are Evangelical (62.366%), 74 are Catholic (19.892%), 1 is Lutheran (0.269%), 4 (1.075%) belong to other religious groups and 61 (16.398%) either have no religion or will not reveal their religious affiliation.

== Politics ==
=== Municipal council ===
The council is made up of 8 council members, who were elected by majority vote at the municipal election held on 7 June 2009, and the honorary mayor as chairman.

=== Mayor ===
Boos's mayor is Sascha Wickert.

=== Coat of arms ===
The municipality's arms might be described thus: Gules the Apostle James holding in his dexter hand a pilgrim's staff and in his sinister hand an escallop, all Or.

== Culture and sightseeing ==
=== Buildings ===
The following are listed buildings or sites in Rhineland-Palatinate’s Directory of Cultural Monuments:

- Evangelical church, Kirchstraße 1 – Gothic aisleless church, west tower essentially Romanesque, latter half of the 11th or earlier half of the 12th century, on Roman building remnants; nave made over in Baroque 1706–1712
- Hauptstraße – remnants of a villa rustica, 1st to 5th century AD, two cryptoportici, two vaulted cellars
- Hauptstraße 20 – town hall, Baroque timber-frame building with open ground floor hall, 18th century
- Kellereistraße 1 – barrel-vaulted cellar with segmental-arch stairway, marked 1598, window above

=== More about buildings ===
One of the most striking buildings in Boos is the old town hall (Rathaus) in the middle of the village, formerly called the Backes (a corruption of the German word Backhaus, meaning “bakehouse”). After it was sold to the Evangelical Church in 1960, the Backes passed back to the municipality through a sale agreement in 2006. After a thorough restoration and the reconstruction (or new construction) of the Backes in 2009 and 2010, the Boos town hall took on a new shine and afforded the local people the opportunity to revive the traditional communal baking at the old bakehouse's oven. The unpaid work, especially, done by many citizens – foremost among them Rüdiger Franzmann, Berthold Schick, Horst and Karl Weyrich – but also contributions made by the state within the framework of village renewal, made it possible to create this gem on the village's Denkmalinsel (“monumental island”, although it is not geographically an island). The historic town hall is currently used for things such as seniors’ coffeehouses, an alternative venue for council meetings, events like Tag des Denkmals (“Day of the Monument”), Advent celebration and other things, too. The building can also be hired for private purposes. Also in the village are the remnants of a Roman villa rustica, built by Romans who settled on the Nahe in the time of the Roman Empire. Visitors can see here how a Roman hypocaust worked. Not far from Boos, between Staudernheim and Odernheim, is the Disibodenberg, upon which the Irish monk Disibod founded a monastery. Hildegard of Bingen lived and worked there for more than 40 years.

=== Clubs ===
The following clubs are active in Boos:

- Angel- und Naturschutzverein Boos — angling and conservation club
- Booser Carneval-Verein — Shrovetide Carnival (Fastnacht) club
- Booser Frauentreff — women's club
- Feuerwehrförderverein — fire brigade promotional association
- Förderverein Booser Denkmalinsel e.V. — Denkmalinsel (“monumental island”) promotional association
- Freiwillige Feuerwehr Boos — volunteer fire brigade
- TUS Boos 1926 e.V. — gymnastic and sport club
- Volksbildungswerk — “people’s education”

=== Public institutions ===
Among public facilities available in Boos are the municipal hall, the sport hall and the sporting ground.

=== Education ===
There are no schools in Boos itself, but the following schools are available to learners from the village in nearby places:

- Geschwister-Scholl-Schule (primary school and Regionalschule, Waldböckelheim, named after Hans and Sophie Scholl, members of a non-violent anti-Nazi resistance cell called White Rose)
- Emanuel-Felke-Gymnasium Bad Sobernheim
- Hauptschule Bad Sobernheim
- Realschule Bad Sobernheim
- Evangelischer Kindergarten ‚Unterm Regenbogen’ (“‘Under the Rainbow’ Evangelical Kindergarten”, Waldböckelheim)
- Katholischer Kindergarten (“Catholic Kindergarten”, daycare centre, Waldböckelheim)

== Famous people ==
=== Sons and daughters of the town ===
- Reinhold Petermann (b. 1925), printer, sculptor and restorer
