= Stephen II of Sponheim =

Stephen II (died 1096) was a German nobleman and an early member of the House of Sponheim. He succeeded his father, Stephen I, as count of Sponheim around 1080. Around 1092 Stephen married Sophia of Formbach. Stephen had several children with Sophia, including Meginhard I, who succeeded him as count of Sponheim, and Jutta, abbess of the Benedictine monastery on Disibodenberg and teacher of Hildegard of Bingen.
