= Hungarian March =

Holy Roman buffer state (1043–1048) in present-day Austria

The Hungarian March (German: Ungarische Mark or Ungarnmark) or Neumark ("New March") was a brief frontier march of the Holy Roman Empire established in the mid-eleventh century by emperor Henry III as a defence against the Kingdom of Hungary. It had only two known margraves before it was annexed to the March of Austria.

- Liutpold, reigned for a few days until his death on 9 December 1043
- Siegfried I, from Sponheim, reigned 1045–1048/1065

The Hungarian march was founded by Henry III following his first campaign against Hungary in 1041. In 1043, the Hungarian king Samuel Aba was forced to sign a peace treaty whereby he gave up the land between the Leitha and Fischa rivers with a line from the Fischa delta to Strachotín in Moravia representing the new border. Henry created a new march in this territory for the eldest son of the Babenberg Margrave Adalbert of Austria. When Liutpold died within days of his confirmation at Ingelheim, Henry replaced him with the Sponheimer Count Siegfried. The centre of the march was Siegfried's castle of villa Stilevrida (Stillfried in present-day Angern an der March). According to Koch (1986, 133), the Hungarian march disappeared with Siegfried's death in 1065. Documents only name him with the title marchio (margrave) between 1045 and 1048, however; thereafter he is only titled comes (count) in the Puster Valley, which he may have received as compensation for losing his march.

The Hungarian march was called the "new march" because it was a "new" eastern march — a sort of extension of Austria. During the reign of Adalbert's younger son Margrave Ernest of Austria, the new march was indeed united to the old march, Austria proper.

== Sources ==
- "Leopold (Sohn des Markgrafen Adalbert von Oesterreich)." Allgemeine Deutsche Biographie, by the Historischen Kommission of the Bayrischen Akademie der Wissenschaften, Band 18, Seite 381ff. (retrieved 27 May 2007, 4:44 UTC)
- Koch, Rudolf (1986). Die Entwicklung der Romanischen Westturmanlage in Österreich. PhD Dissertation, University of Vienna.
