= Sponheim family =

German noble family

Sponheim
- Country: Rhenish Franconia
- Founded: c. 1044; 982 years ago
- Founder: Siegfried I, Count of Sponheim
- Final ruler: Joseph Carl, Reichsgraf von Ortenburg
- Titles: Counts (Grafen, Reichsgrafen) of Sponheim; Margraves of the Hungarian March and of Istria; Dukes of Carinthia and Margraves of Verona, lords of Carniola and the Slovene March
- Dissolution: 1806; 220 years ago
- Cadet branches: Ortenburg-Neuortenburg, Bolanden-Dannenfels, Heinsberg, Neef, Sayn-Wittgenstein, arguably Vianden

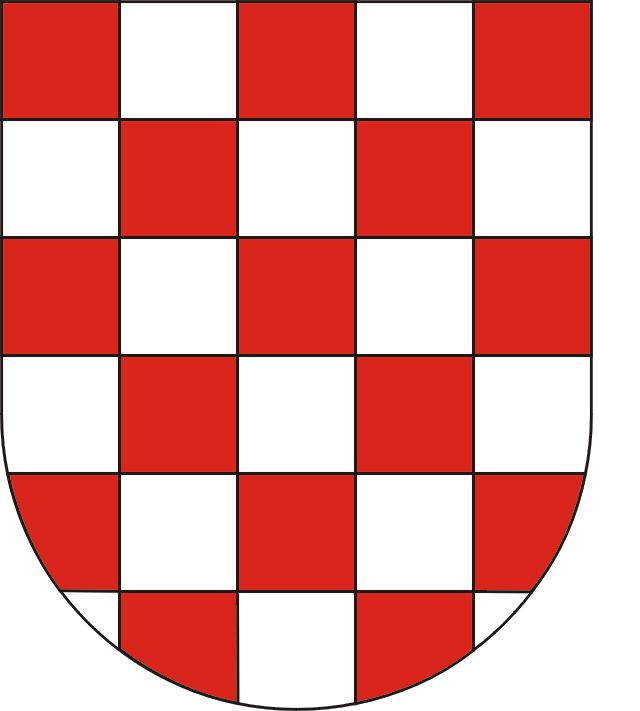
Original arms of the House of Sponheim

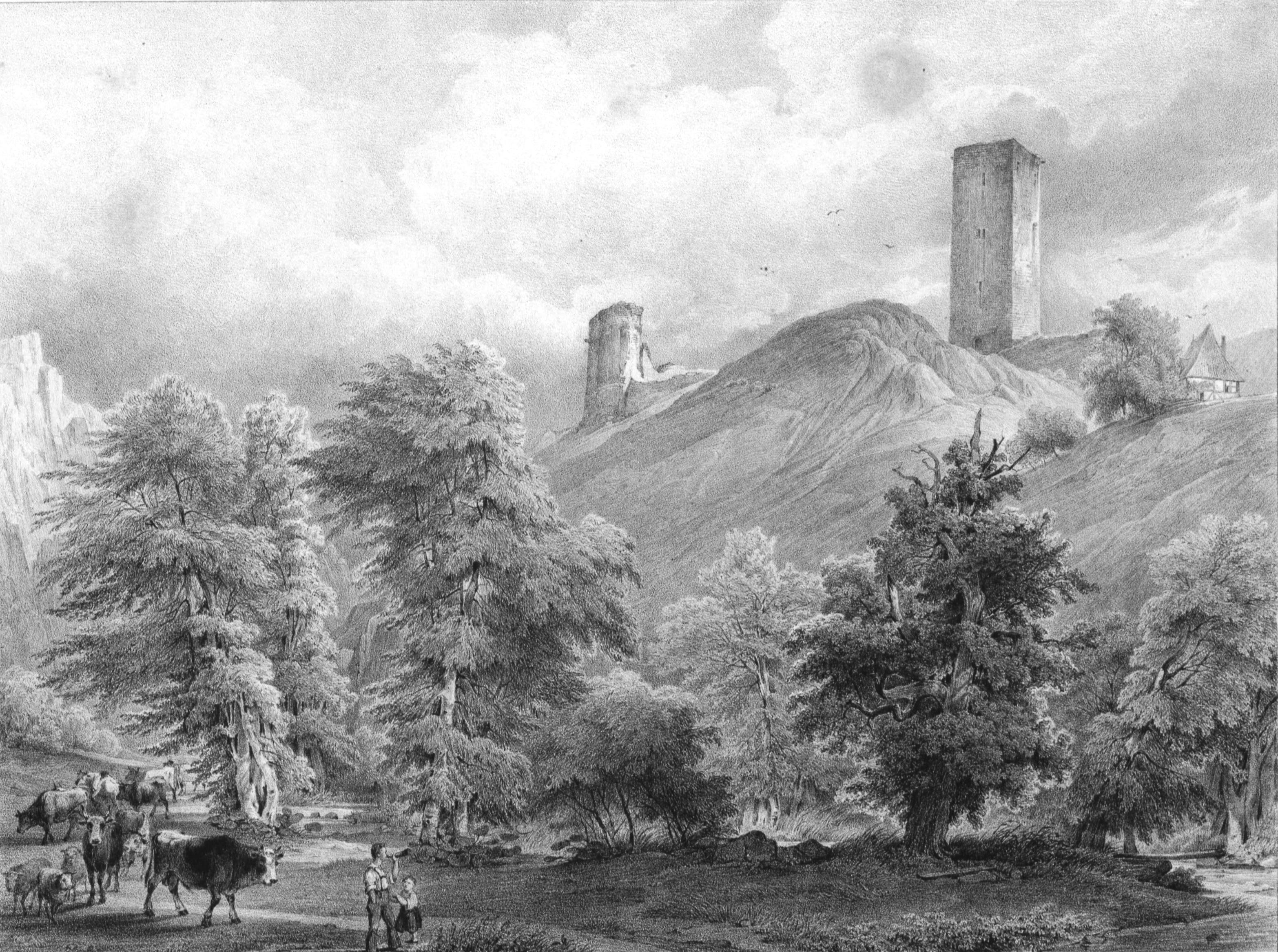
Sponheim Castle ruins (19th century), Caspar Scheuren

The House of Sponheim or Spanheim was a medieval German noble family, which originated in Rhenish Franconia. They were immediate Counts of Sponheim until 1437 and Dukes of Carinthia from 1122 until 1269. Its cadet branches ruled in the Imperial County of Ortenburg-Neuortenburg and various Sayn-Wittgenstein states until 1806.

== History ==
The family took its name from their ancestral seat at Sponheim Castle in the Hunsrück range, in present-day Burgsponheim near Bad Kreuznach, Rhineland-Palatinate. From the 11th century the family was divided in two closely related branches.

One of these branches, probably the senior one, retained the Duchy of Carinthia and originated the County of Ortenburg in Bavaria. The other one remained in Rhenish Franconia, retaining the County of Sponheim.

The founder of the ducal branch was Count Siegfried I (1010–1065), a Ripuarian Frank by birth and retainer of the Salian emperor Conrad II. For this reason the family is sometimes termed the Siegfrieding. Siegfried followed Conrad in his 1035 campaign against Duke Adalbero of Carinthia, who for unknown reasons had fallen out of favour with the emperor.

By his marriage to Richgard, daughter of one Count Engelbert of the Bavarian Sieghardinger noble family, he became heir to large territories in Carinthia and Tyrol. In 1045 Siegfried received the title of a margrave in the Hungarian March by Emperor Henry III. His sons Engelbert, Margrave in Istria from 1090, and Hartwig founded Saint Paul's Abbey, Lavanttal on their mother's estates in 1091.

When the ducal House of Eppenstein became extinct in 1122, Siegfried's grandson Henry inherited the title and became the first Sponheim Duke of Carinthia as well as Margrave in the Italian March of Verona. Upon his death only one year later, he was succeeded by his brother Engelbert, whose descendants ruled in Carinthia until the death of Duke Ulrich III in 1269.

Engelbert's younger son Rapoto became the ancestor of the Bavarian Ortenburg dynasty. The Sponheim dukes tried to consolidate their possessions by being loyal liensmen of the Imperial House of Hohenstaufen, they nevertheless had to struggle with reluctant local nobles like the Carinthian Ortenburger. The margravial title in Verona was lost to Herman III of Baden in 1151.

Under Bernhard of Sponheim, Carinthian duke from 1202 until 1256, the dynasty reached the height of its power. In 1213 he married Judith, a daughter of King Ottokar I of Bohemia, which affiliated the ducal line with the Czech royal Přemyslid dynasty. Bernhard's son Ulrich III by marriage with Agnes of Merania in 1248 also inherited the title of a margrave in the adjacent March of Carniola. However, as he outlived his children, he bequested his Carinthian and Carniolan lands to his Přemyslid cousin King Ottokar II of Bohemia according to a secret inheritance agreement of 1268. These estates were among the territories which Rudolph of Habsburg after his election as King of the Romans in 1273 seized due to their acquisition in suspicious circumstances.

The founder of the Rhenish branch was Count Stephan I of Sponheim (d. 1080), who may have been a 1st cousin, a son or a nephew of Siegfried. One of his successors Gottfried III (1183–1218) married Adelheid of Sayn, sister and heiress of the last Count of Sayn, Henry II.

In 1437 this branch's ruling male line in Sponheim died out, and female line descendants, namely the Margraves of Baden and the Counts Palatine of Simmern-Zweibrücken-Birkenfeld, took on the title of Count to Sponheim, along with the Elector of the Palatinate, who had received a small part as dowry.

The branch of the Counts of Ortenburg is still living today in Tambach (Bavaria). A lateral line of the Rhenish branch survives also with the Princes of Sayn-Wittgenstein.

== Genealogy ==
=== Ducal line ===
Carinthian ducal coat of arms until 1246

Carinthian coat of arms from 1246

1. Siegfried I (d. 1065), Count in the Puster Valley, Margrave of the Hungarian March
  1. Hartwig (d. 1102), Archbishop of Magdeburg
  2. Engelbert I (d. 1096), Margrave of Istria
    1. Bernhard of Trixen (d. 1147)
    2. Richardis (d. about 1112), married to Margrave Poppo II of Carniola
    3. Henry IV (1065/70–1123), Duke of Carinthia and Margrave of Verona
    4. Engelbert II (d. 1141), Margrave of Carniola and Istria, Duke of Carinthia and Margrave of Verona
      1. Ulrich I (d. 1144), Duke of Carinthia and Margrave of Verona
        1. Henry V (d. 1161), Duke of Carinthia, Margrave of Verona until 1151
        2. Herman II (d. 1181), Duke of Carinthia
          1. Ulrich II (1176–1202), Duke of Carinthia
          2. Bernhard (c. 1180–1256), Duke of Carinthia
            1. Ulrich III (c. 1220–1269), Margrave of Carniola since 1248, Duke of Carinthia, married to Agnes of Merania and secondly to Agnes of Baden
            2. Philip (d. 1279) Archbishop-elect of Salzburg, Patriarch of Aquileia
        3. Ulrich, Count of Laibach (Ljubljana), but predeceased his eldest brother.
        4. Godfrey (Gottfried) became a monk, but predeceased his father.
        5. Pilgrim became the Patriarch of Aquileia.
      2. Engelbert III (1124–1173), Margrave of Istria, Margrave of Tuscany
      3. Henry (d. 1169), Bishop of Troyes
      4. Rapoto (d. 1186), Count of Ortenburg, founder of the House of Ortenburg
      5. Adelheid (d. 1178), Abbess at Göss
      6. Hartwig II (d. 1164), Bishop of Regensburg
      7. Matilda (d. 1160/61), married to Count Theobald II of Champagne
    5. Siegfried II (d. 1132), Count at Lebenau
    6. Hartwig I (d. 1126), Bishop of Regensburg
2. Frederick (1022–1058)
3. Eberhard

=== Comital line ===
1. Stephan I (d. about 1080), probably a cousin or brother of Siegfried I
  1. Stephan II (d. about 1118), probably married to Sophia of Formbach, widow of Count Hermann of Salm, German anti-king from 1081
    1. Meginhard I (d. 1136/45), married to Mechtild, daughter of Count Adalbert II of Nellenburg
      1. Godfrey I (d. after 1159), probably married to Matilda (Mechtild), daughter of Duke Simon I of Lorraine
        1. Godfrey II, probably married to a daughter of Count Gerlach of Veldenz
          1. Godfrey III (c. 1175–1218), married to Adelheid, sister of Count Henry III of Sayn, died in the Fifth Crusade
            1. John I of Sponheim-Starkenburg (c. 1206-1266), Count of Sayn from 1263, probably married to a daughter of Count Frederick of Isenberg, see Sponheim-Starkenburg below
            2. Henry (d. 1259), married to Agnes of Heinsberg
            3. Simon I of Sponheim-Kreuznach (c. 1210-1264), married to Margaret of Heimbach, see Sponheim-Kreuznach below
    2. Gerhard I, probably married to a daughter of Count Bertolph of Vianden
    3. Hugo (d. 1137), Archbishop of Cologne
    4. Jutta (1091–1136), Abbess at Disibodenberg

Sponheim-Starkenburg coat of arms

==== Sponheim-Starkenburg ====
1. John I (c. 1206-1266), Count of Sayn from 1263, probably married to a daughter of Count Frederick of Isenberg
  1. Godfrey I of Sponheim-Sayn (d. 1284), married to Jutta of Isenburg
    1. John II of Sayn-Sayn
    2. Engelbert of Sayn-Homburg, ancestor of the House of Sayn-Wittgenstein
  2. Henry I (c. 1235-1289), married to Blancheflor, daughter of Count William IV of Jülich
    1. John II (c. 1265-1324), married to Catherine of Vianden
      1. Henry II (c. 1292-1323), married to Loretta of Salm
        1. John III (c. 1315-1398), married to Mechtild of the Palatinate, niece of Emperor Louis IV
          1. John IV (c. 1338-1413/14), married to Elizabeth, daughter of Count Walram of Sponheim-Kreuznach (see below)
            1. John V (c. 1359-1437), also Count of Sponheim-Kreuznach from 1417, married to Walburg of Leiningen, died childless
          2. Mechtild (d. 1407/10), married to Margrave Rudolf VI of Baden
          3. Loretta, married to Count Henry III of Veldenz
            1. Frederick III of Veldenz (d. 1444)
              1. Anna of Veldenz (c. 1390-1439), married to Count Palatine Stephen of Simmern-Zweibrücken

Sponheim-Kreuznach coat of arms

==== Sponheim-Kreuznach ====
1. Simon I (c. 1210-1264), married to Margaret of Heimbach
  1. John I (c. 1245-1290), married to Adelheid of Leiningen
    1. John II (c. 1270-1340), unmarried
    2. Simon II at Kastellaun (c. 1270-1336), married to Elizabeth of Valkenburg
      1. Walram (c. 1305-1380), married to Elizabeth of Katzenelnbogen
        1. Simon III (c. 1330-1414), married to Maria of Vianden, died without male heirs
          1. Elizabeth (d. 1417), married to Count Engelbert III of the Mark, secondly to Prince Ruprecht Pipan, son of Rupert of the Palatinate
        2. Elizabeth, married to Count John IV of Sponheim-Starkenburg (see above)

== See also ==
- Genealogia Sponhemica
- Sponheim

== Sources ==
- Freed, John B. "Reflections on the Medieval German Nobility." The American Historical Review, Vol. 91, No. 3. (Jun., 1986), pp 553–575.
- (in German) Genealogia Sponhemica. Archiv für rheinische Geschichte Coblenz, 1.1833 - 2.1835. Zweiter Teil 1835. http://www.dilibri.de/rlb/periodical/pageview/27862
