= Burgsponheim =

- Municipality
- Coat of arms

- Location of Burgsponheim within Bad Kreuznach district
- Interactive map of Burgsponheim
- Location within Germany Location within Rhineland-Palatinate
- Coordinates: 49°50′2″N 7°42′59″E
- Country: Germany
- State: Rhineland-Palatinate
- District: Bad Kreuznach
- Municipal assoc.: Rüdesheim

Government
  - Mayor (2019–24): Simone Bopp-Schmid

Area
  - Total: 1.10 km^{2} (0.42 sq mi)
- Elevation: 235 m (771 ft)

Population (2025-12-31)
  - Total: 218
  - Density: 198/km^{2} (513/sq mi)
- Time zone: UTC+01:00 (CET)
  - Summer (DST): UTC+02:00 (CEST)
- Postal codes: 55595
- Dialling codes: 06758
- Vehicle registration: KH
- Website: www.burgsponheim.de

Burgsponheim is an Ortsgemeinde – a municipality belonging to a Verbandsgemeinde, a kind of collective municipality – in the Bad Kreuznach district in Rhineland-Palatinate, Germany. It belongs to the Verbandsgemeinde of Rüdesheim, whose seat is in the municipality of Rüdesheim an der Nahe. Burgsponheim is a winegrowing centre.

== Geography ==
=== Location ===
Burgsponheim is one of the smaller municipalities in the Verbandsgemeinde of Rüdesheim with roughly 300 inhabitants. It lies on a hill above the Ellerbach valley and is framed on all sides by woodland, meadows and vineyards, leading through which are hiking trails. Burgsponheim lies between the Soonwald and the Nahe, 15 km west of Bad Kreuznach and about 50 km west of Mainz. For centuries it was characterized by agriculture and winegrowing, but over the last thirty years or so it has undergone a shift to an almost purely residential community.

=== Neighbouring municipalities ===
Clockwise from the north, Burgsponheim's neighbours are the municipality of Sponheim, the municipality of Waldböckelheim and the municipality of Bockenau.

=== Constituent communities ===
Also belonging to Burgsponheim is the outlying homestead of Akvas Mühle.

== History ==
What is now the land making up Burgsponheim began to be settled sometime about the 10th century when the Counts of Sponheim began building work on their castle (the Burg— prefix in the village's name means "castle"; the rest of the name is drawn from the comital family's name). The castle had its first documentary mention in 1127. A man named Bertoldus clericus, capellanus de castro Spanheim ("Bertoldus the cleric, chaplain at Castle Sponheim") appeared among the series of witnesses to a document signed by Count Meginhard of Sponheim. A further document from Archbishop of Mainz Adalbert in that same year described that same nobleman as commes Megenhardus de castro Spanheim ("Count Megenhardus from Castle Sponheim"). In the early 13th century, the Counts of Sponheim moved their residential and administrative seat, formerly at Castle Kautzenburg, to Kreuznach. This, and the later division of the Counts of Sponheim into the Starkenburg and Kreuznach lines led to the original Castle Sponheim gradually losing its importance about 1235. In 1620, during the Thirty Years' War, the whole castle complex was destroyed by the Spanish general Spinola. The village's situation, along with the wartime predicament in which its agriculture then found itself is documented in depth in Sebastian Wendell's Burgsponheimer Tagebuch (journal). This book, kept in the years 1639 to 1646, is available today in a reprint edition. During the war, the village was often overrun. Many times, the villagers fled for shelter at the Schloss in Winterburg. Many were killed in the war's ravages. In 1721, a simple church was set up in the former "tithe barn". The building was given a ridge turret. Bit by bit, the village grew. A great number of the buildings that now stand in the village centre date from the late 18th or early 19th century. Around the village arose a belt of newer, bigger properties. From 1896 to 1936, the Kreuznach-Winterburg Kleinbahn line led by Burgsponheim and had stops at the mills in the Ellerbach valley. This line is nowadays used as a cycle path and hiking trail and is part of the Verbandsgemeinde of Rüdesheim cycle path circuit (about 35 km long). Burgsponheim won first place in the main class in the contest Unser Dorf soll schöner werden ("Our village should become lovelier") or Unser Dorf hat Zukunft ("Our village has a future" – both names are printed on the certificates) at the district level in 2002, and third place in the special class in 2003.

=== Population development ===
Burgsponheim's population development since Napoleonic times is shown in the table below. The figures for the years from 1871 to 1987 are drawn from census data.

Year	Inhabitants
1815	202
1835	225
1871	244
1905	221
1939	197

Year	Inhabitants
1950	220
1961	215
1970	222
1987	203
2005	233

== Religion ==
As at 31 August 2013, there are 246 full-time residents in Burgsponheim, and of those, 163 are Evangelical (66.26%), 40 are Catholic (16.26%) and 43 (17.48%) either have no religion or will not reveal their religious affiliation.

== Politics ==
=== Municipal council ===
The council is made up of 6 council members, who were elected by majority vote at the municipal election held on 7 June 2009, and the honorary mayor as chairman.

=== Mayor ===
Burgsponheim's mayor is Simone Bopp-Schmid.

=== Coat of arms ===
The municipality's arms might be described thus: Per pale chequy of twenty-one argent and gules and gules issuant from base a tower embattled with six windows, two, two and two on a pedestal masoned sable, the whole of the first.

== Culture and sightseeing ==
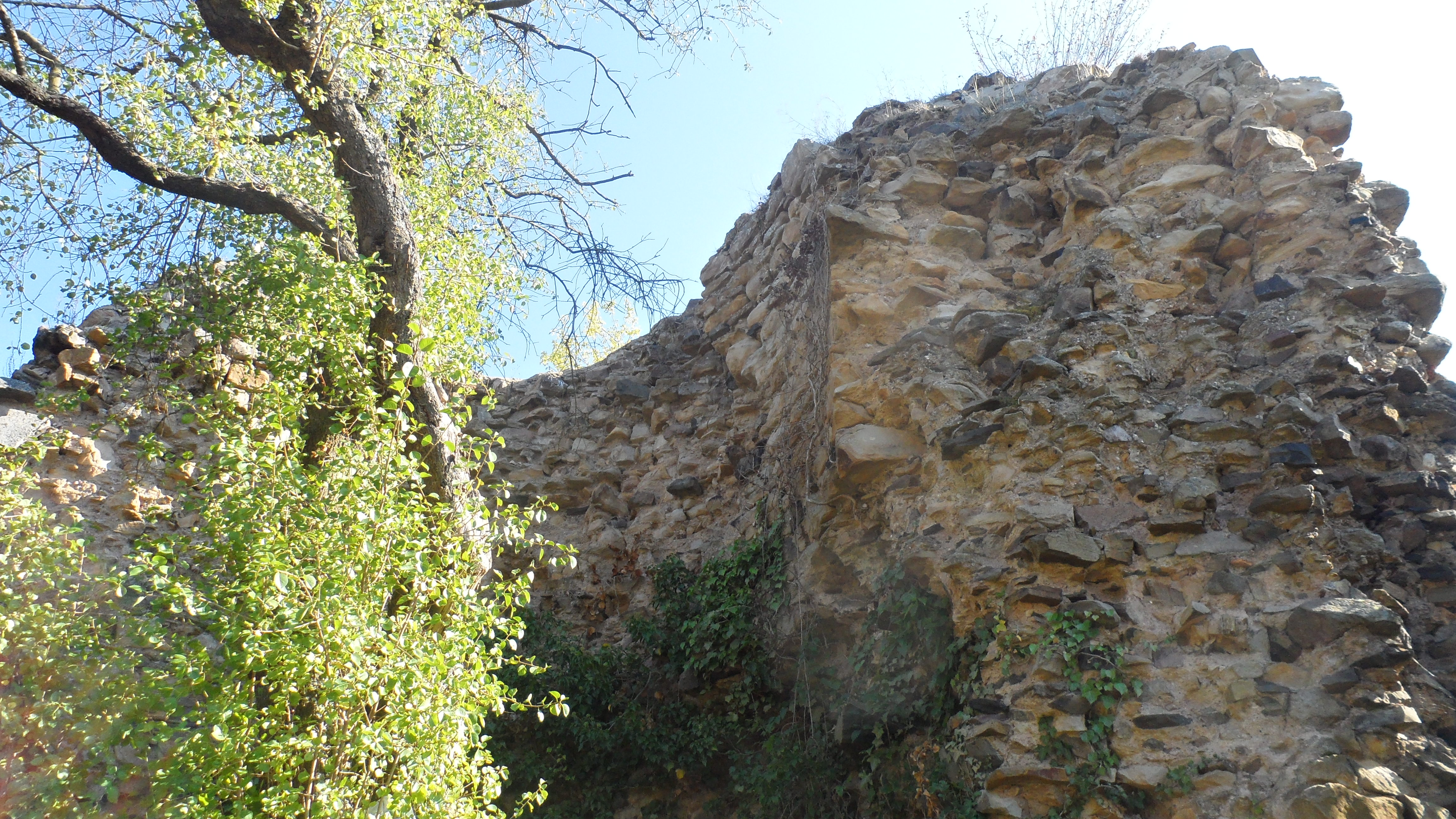
Castle Sponheim (monumental zone)

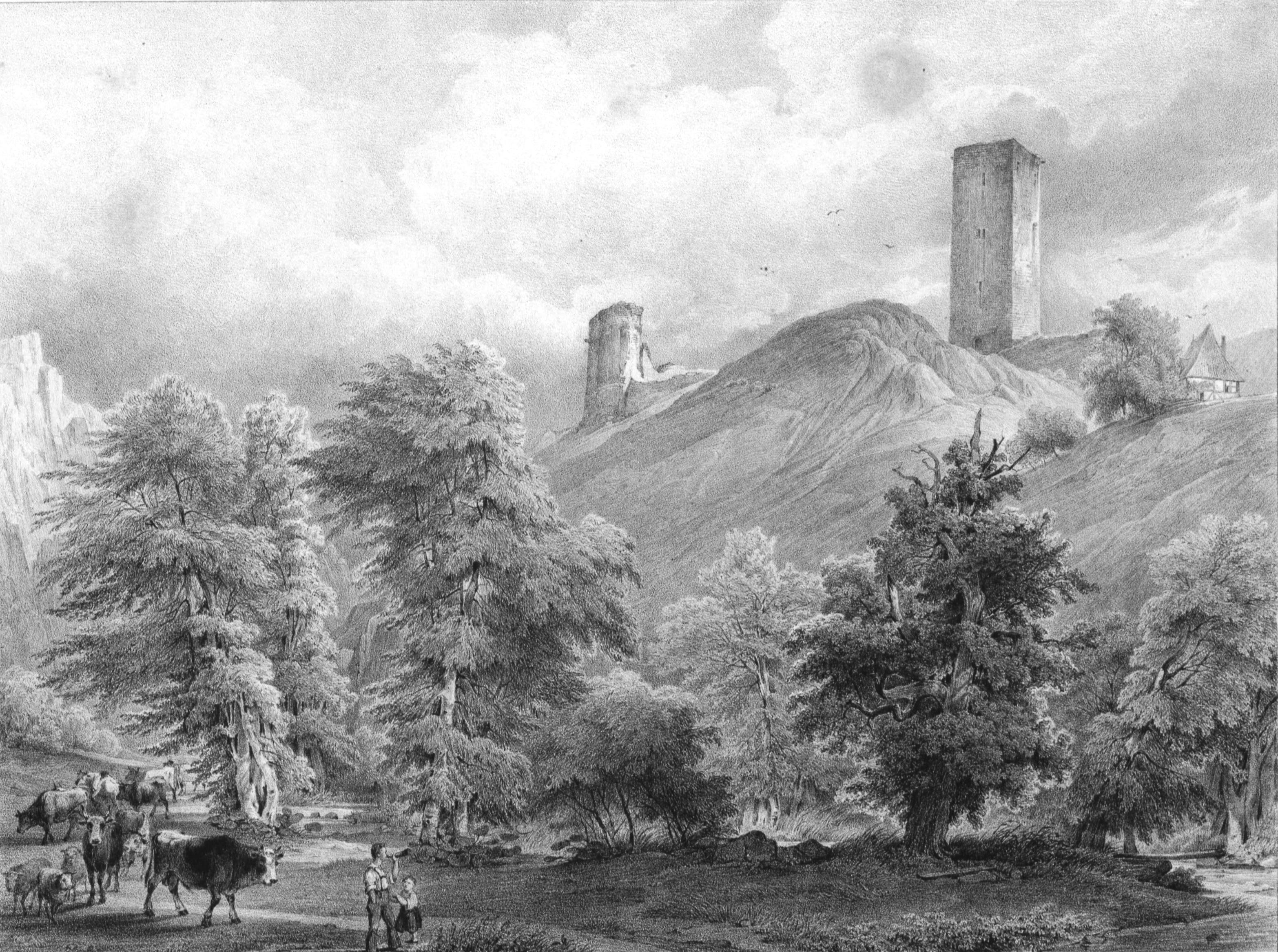
19th-century drawing of Castle Sponheim

=== Buildings ===
The following are listed buildings or sites in Rhineland-Palatinate's Directory of Cultural Monuments:

- Hauptstraße 4: plastered timber-frame house of an estate complex, marked 1616, one-floor front building, 18th or 19th century
- Hauptstraße 15: Baroque timber-frame house, partly solid, essentially from the mid 18th century; bricked-up portal arch, marked 1687 (?); house door marked 1898
- Im Lindengarten 1: former school with teacher's dwelling; one-floor building with mansard roof built like a country house, Heimatstil, about 1910
- Castle Sponheim ruin (monumental zone): remnants of Castle Sponheim, founded about 1000, destroyed in 1620: ringwall, round tower; keep, early 13th century

=== Clubs ===
The following clubs are active in Burgsponheim:

- Burgpiraten Burgsponheim e.V. — "Castle pirates" (children's club)
- Frauenhilfe — women's aid
- Freiwillige Feuerwehr — volunteer fire brigade
- Freundeskreis der Burg Sponheim e.V. — Castle Sponheim "Circle of Friends"
- Posaunenchor — trombone choir
- Pro Burgsponheim e.V. — club for promoting village community and making contributions to public and cultural life
- Seniorenkreis — seniors' circle

=== Village song ===
Burgsponheim has a village song called Mein Burgsponheim, with melody by Chr. Etten and lyrics by Ludwig Hand from Burgsponheim. These are translated below.

German	English translation
First verse
Ich kenne ein Dörfchen am Ellerbachstrand: Burgsponheim wird dieses Kleinod genannt. Es liegt auf der Höhe im sonnigen Schein, umkränzet mit Reben voll feurigem Wein.	I know a little village on the Ellerbach bank: Burgsponheim is this jewel's name. It lies on the heights in the sunny shine, Wreathed with grapes and spirited wine.
Chorus
Erhebet die Gläser, stimmt fröhlich mit ein: Es lebe Burgsponheim, sein Volk und sein Wein!	Raise your glasses, join merrily in: Long live Burgsponheim, its people and its wine!
Second verse
Dort wohnet ein Völkchen, stets fröhlich und frei. Es liebt seine Heimat, ist ehrbar und treu. Die Burg, die Ruine, sie künden noch heut von Grafengeschlechtern vergangener Zeit! Wiederhole Refrain	There lives a little people, always merry and free. They love their home, are respectable and loyal. The castle, the ruin, they still announce today Of comital families of bygone times! Repeat chorus
Third verse
Weilst fern du, o Wanderer, im fremden Land, vergiß nie das Dörfchen am Ellerbachstrand. Erhalte, o Gott mir die Heimat noch lang mit ihren froh'n Liedern, dem Wein und dem Sang! Wiederhole Refrain	While tarrying afar, O wanderer, in foreign lands, Never forget the little village on the Ellerbach bank. Long keep for me, O God, my home With its merry songs, the wine and the song! Repeat chorus

== Economy and infrastructure ==
=== Transport ===
Running through Burgsponheim is Kreisstraße 55, which towards the southeast leads to Bundesstraße 41, which itself leads to Bad Sobernheim to the west and Rüdesheim an der Nahe and Bad Kreuznach to the east. Just beyond Bad Kreuznach is an interchange onto Autobahn A 61 (Koblenz–Ludwigshafen). Serving neighbouring Waldböckelheim is a railway station on the Nahe Valley Railway (Bingen–Saarbrücken).
