= Engelbert of Carinthia =

Duke of Carinthia from 1123–1135

Engelbert
- Duke of Carinthia
- Died: 13 April 1141; Seeon Abbey
- Noble family: House of Sponheim
- Spouse: Uta of Passau
- Issue: Ulric I Engelbert III; Henry; Matilda; Rapoto I Adelheid; Hartwig II; Ida
- Father: Engelbert I, Margrave of Istria
- Mother: Hedwig

Engelbert II (died 13 April 1141), a member of the House of Sponheim, was Margrave of Istria and Carniola from about 1103/07 until 1124. In 1123, he succeeded his elder brother Henry as Duke of Carinthia and Margrave of Verona which he held until his retirement in 1135.

== Life ==
Engelbert II was the son of Engelbert I, Margrave of Istria (d. 1096) and his wife Hedwig of uncertain descent, maybe a daughter of the Billung duke Bernard II of Saxony. His grandfather Count Siegfried I of Sponheim (d. 1065) came to Carinthia about 1035 as an attendant of Emperor Conrad II.

In 1099 Pope Urban II appointed Engelbert II Vogt protector of Saint Paul's Abbey, founded by his father. About 1100 he established the County of Kraiburg on the inherited estates of his wife Uta, daughter of Burgrave Ulric of Passau. He also acquired two castles in the Trixen valley near Völkermarkt from the Bishop of Gurk and the market town of Friesach in 1106. About 1107 he was elevated to a margrave in Istria and Carniola, succeeding Count Ulric II of Weimar.

Unlike his father, Engelbert II was a loyal supporter of the ruling Salian dynasty and also a fierce opponent of Archbishop Conrad I of Salzburg in the yet unresolved Investiture Controversy. He stood as guarantor of German king Henry V at his coronation as Holy Roman Emperor in February 1111 and witnessed the Concordat of Worms with Pope Callixtus II in September 1122. In the same year his elder brother Henry IV was created Duke of Carinthia and Margrave of Verona, and upon his death in 1123 Engelbert II succeeded him. The next year he ceded Istria to his son Engelbert III.

In 1135 Engelbert II renounced Carinthia and Verona, whereafter Emperor Lothair II enfeoffed his son Ulrich I. Engelbert retired to Seeon Abbey in the Bavarian Chiemgau, where he died on 13 April 1141.

== Marriage and issue ==
About 1103 he married Uta, daughter of Burgrave Ulric of Passau (died 2 February 1099). Together they were the parents of the following children:

- Ulric I, succeeded his father in Carinthia in 1135
- Engelbert III, succeeded his father in Istria, Carniola and Kraiburg in 1124
- Henry, bishop of Troyes in 1145
- Matilda, married Count Theobald IV of Blois
- Rapoto I, count of Ortenburg in 1130 and Kraiburg in 1173
- Adelaide, abbess of Göss in 1146
- Hartwig, bishop of Regensburg in 1155
- Ida, married Count William III of Nevers

== Sources ==
- Bouchard, Constance Brittain (1987). Sword, Miter, and Cloister: Nobility and the Church in Burgundy, 980-1198. Cornell University Press.
- Loibl, Richard (1997). Der Herrschaftsraum der Grafen von Vornbach und ihrer Nachfolger: Studien zur Herrschaftsgeschichte Ostbayerns im hohen Mittelalter (in German). Vol. 1. Komm. für Bayer. Landesgeschichte.
- Lyon, Jonathan (2007). "The Withdrawal of Aged Noblemen into Monastic Communities: Interpreting the Sources from Twelfth-Century Germany". In Classen, Albrecht (ed.). Old Age in the Middle Ages and the Renaissance. Walter De Gruyter.
- Schenk, Jochen (2017). The Origins of the German Principalities, 1100-1350: Essays by German Historians. Taylor & Francis.

Engelbert of Carinthia House of Sponheim Died: 12 or 13 April 1141
Preceded by Ulric II	Margrave of Istria; Margrave of Carniola; 1107–1123	Succeeded by Engelbert III
Preceded by Henry IV	Duke of Carinthia; Margrave of Verona; 1123–1135	Succeeded by Ulrich I
