= Saint Paul's Abbey, Lavanttal =

Benedictine monastery in Sankt Paul im Lavanttal, Austria

Saint Paul's Abbey
- Stift Paul im Lavanttal
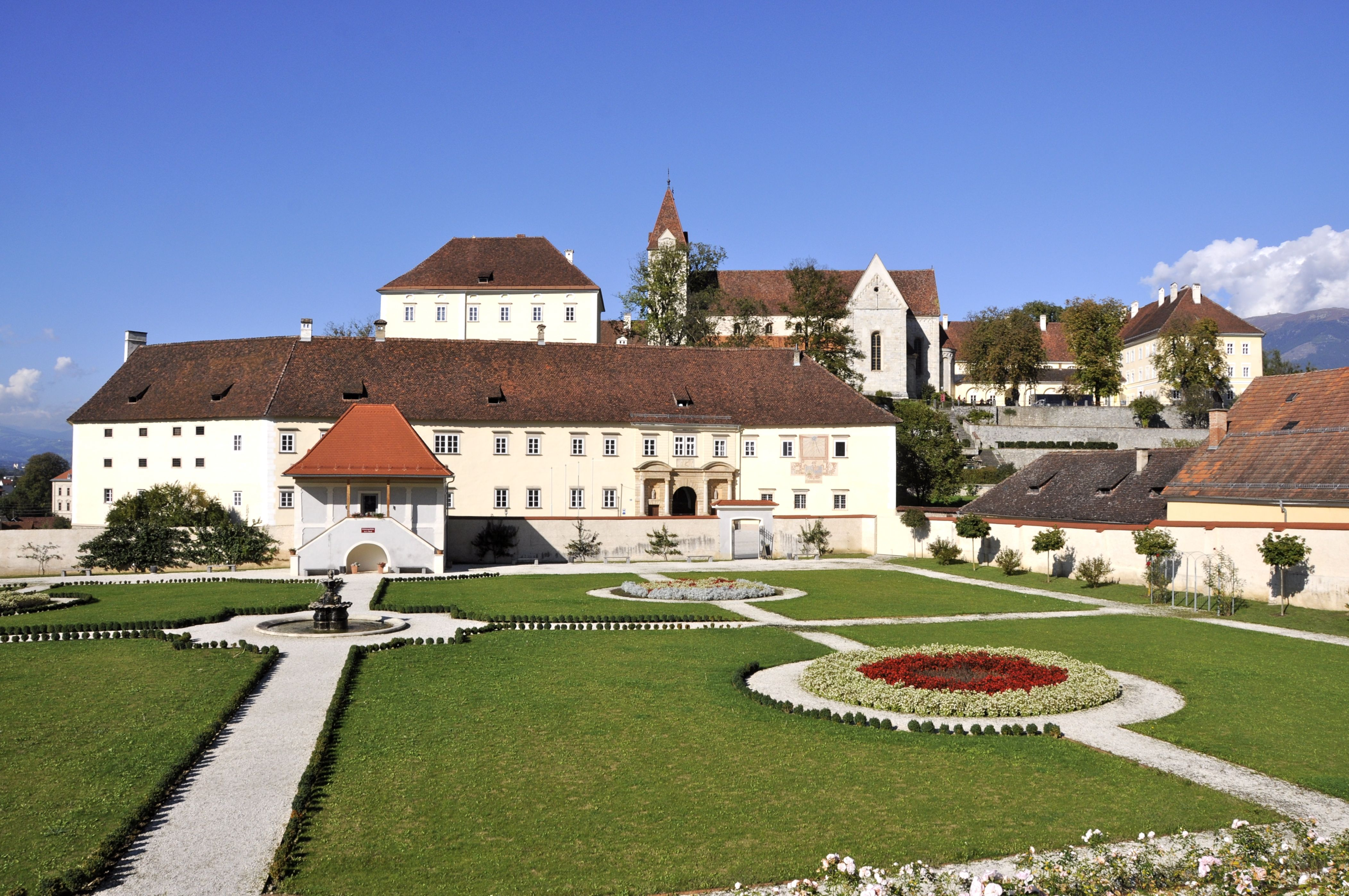
- Monastery complex

Religion
- Affiliation: Christian
- District: Wolfsberg
- Rite: Catholic
- Ecclesiastical or organisational status: Monastery
- Patron: Saint Paul
- Year consecrated: 991; 1035 years ago, 1090; 936 years ago
- Status: Active

Location
- Location: Sankt Paul im Lavanttal, Wolfsberg, Carinthia, Austria
- Municipality: Sankt Paul im Lavanttal
- State: Carinthia
- Interactive map of Saint Paul's Abbey
- Coordinates: 46°42′02″N 14°52′22″E

Architecture
- Type: Castle (before 991), Monastery
- Style: Baroque, Gothic, Romanesque
- Founder: Engelbert I, Margrave of Istria
- Groundbreaking: 991

Saint Paul's Abbey in Lavanttal (German: Stift St. Paul im Lavanttal) is a Benedictine monastery established in 1091 near the present-day market town of Sankt Paul im Lavanttal in the Austrian state of Carinthia. The premises centered on the Romanesque monastery church were largely rebuilt in a Baroque style in the 17th century.

The abbey was dissolved in 1782 by decree of Emperor Joseph II, but resettled in 1809 with monks descending from St. Blaise Abbey in the Black Forest.

== History ==
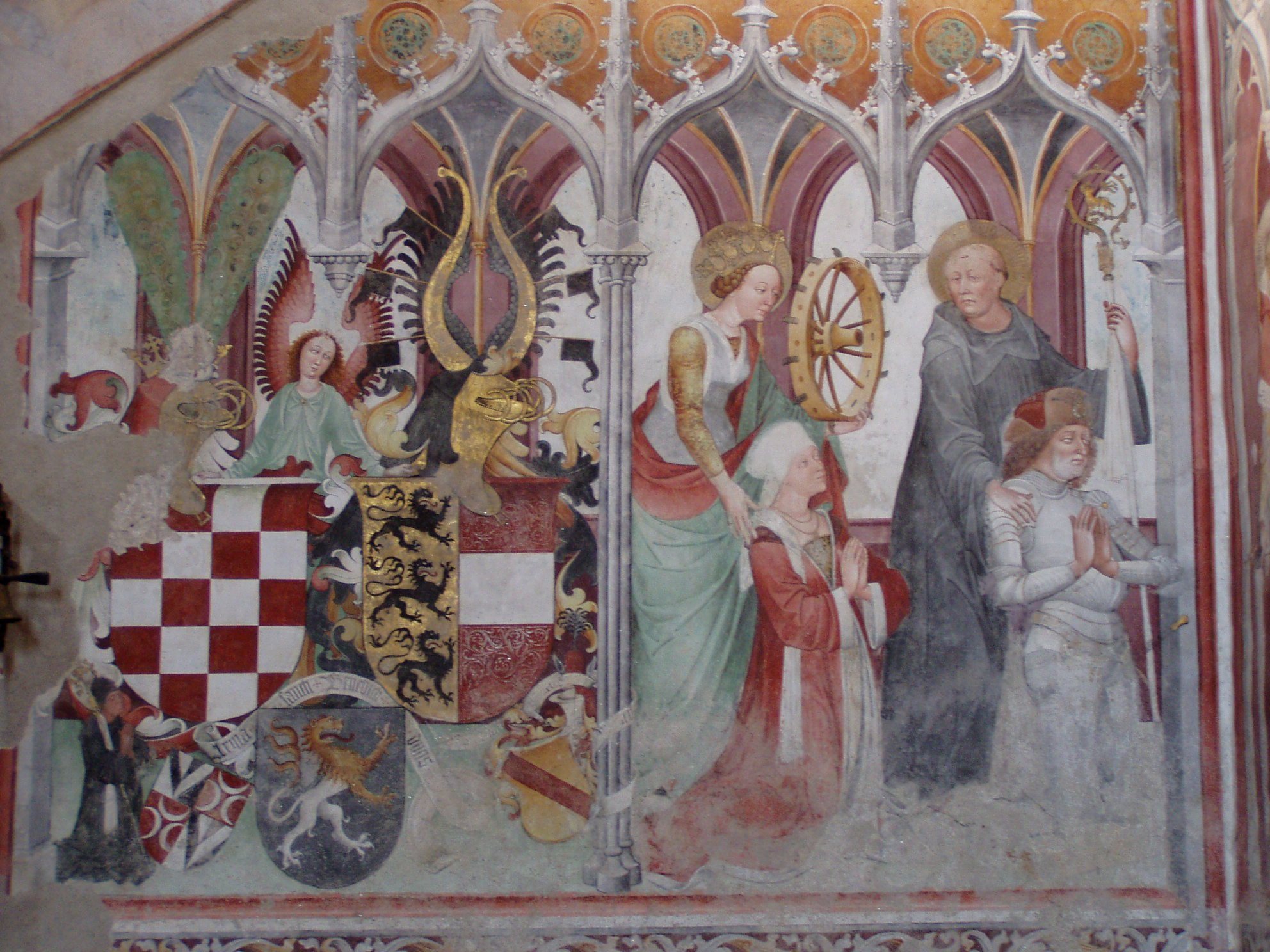
Engelbert of Spanheim and his wife Hedwig (kneeling) with Sts Catherine and Benedict of Nursia, 1493 fresco

The abbey was founded by the Sponheim count Engelbert I, Margrave of Istria since 1090, on the site of a former castle and a church consecrated by Archbishop Hartwig of Salzburg in 991. A follower of Pope Gregory VII and Archbishop Gebhard of Salzburg in the Investiture Controversy with Emperor Henry IV, Engelbert had forfeited his county in the Tyrolean Puster Valley but could retire to the Carinthian estates his father Siegfried I of Spanheim had acquired through his marriage with the local aristocrat Richgard.

A second church dedicated to Saint Paul the Apostle had already been erected at the site by Count Siegfried I. In 1085 Engelbert sent his eldest son Engelbert II to Abbot William of Hirsau in Swabia. He returned to Carinthia with twelve Benedictine monks from Hirsau Abbey, who received the church and monastery of St. Paul's on 1 May 1091, together with large estates in the Lavant Valley, in the March of Styria and in Friuli. Count Engelbert thereby continued the tradition of several Benedictine monastery foundations in the Carinthian duchy, such as Saint George's Abbey, Längsee about 1000, Ossiach Abbey around 1024, the nunnery of Gurk about 1043, and Millstatt Abbey around 1070. In April 1095 he joined the monastic community himself and died at St. Paul's Abbey the next year.

Backed by subsidies from Hirsau Abbey as well as by Engelbert's brother Archbishop Hartwig of Magdeburg, the monastery quickly prospered and, with its own scriptorium and a grammar school, evolved into the most significant Abbey in Carinthia. Pope Urban II put it under papal protection in 1099 and prevented its development to a proprietary monastery of the Sponheim dynasty. The ecclesiastical reservation was renewed by Pope Innocent II, who decreed the abbey's exemption in 1140, while the Sponheims, ruling Dukes of Carinthia since 1122, served as Vogt protectors.

The abbots had to cope with the resentment of the local nobility and sought protection from both the Papacy and the Holy Roman Emperor. During the 15th century conflict of the Habsburg duke Frederick III with the Counts of Celje, the troops of Count Ulrich II devastated the premises. The abbey was again ravaged by Ottoman forces in 1476 and besieged by the Hungarian king Matthias Corvinus in 1480. In the early Ottoman–Habsburg wars, the Habsburg rulers increasingly encumbered the monastery with tributes. They rivalled with the Prince-Archbishops of Salzburg to exert influence, while the conventual life decayed. In the 16th century, large parts of Carinthia turned Protestant and two abbots were declared deposed by Archduke Charles II of Inner Austria.

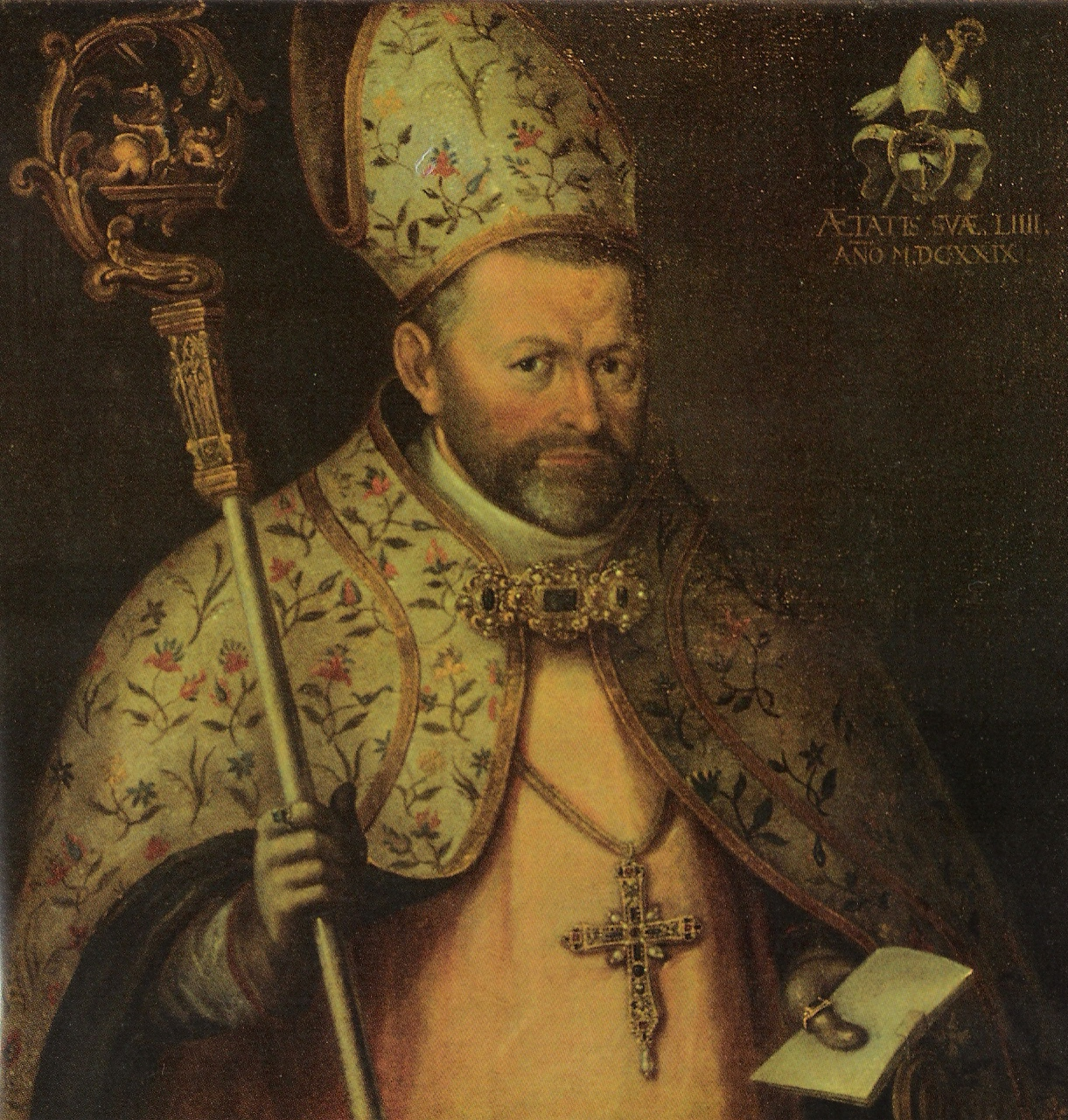
Abbot Hieronymus Marchstaller, 1629 portrait

The resurgence of St. Paul's began under Hieronymus Marchstaller, abbot from 1616. The derelict premises around the monastery church were rebuilt according to plans modelled on the Spanish Escorial. The reconstruction was completed under Marchstaller's successors until 1683.

In 1782/87 Emperor Joseph II dissolved the monastery and nationalised its possessions, however, in 1809, under the Prince-Abbot Dr. Berthold Rottler, monks from St. Blaise's Abbey in the Black Forest, which had also just been dissolved, moved into the premises. In 1940 the abbey was dissolved again by the National Socialists but the monks were able to return when it was reopened in 1947. Today it is the oldest operational monastery in Carinthia.

From 1641 the abbey was a member of the Salzburg Congregation, which in 1930 was merged into the present Austrian Congregation of the Benedictine Confederation.

== Abbey church ==
Within the abbey precinct there is a Romanesque basilica dating from the end of the 12th century. After a fire in 1367 a Gothic vaulted ceiling was added, painted with 44 frescoes by the Tyrolean masters Friedrich and Michael Pacher.

The interior decoration of the church by the Styrian artist Philipp Jakob Straub dates from the 18th century. Beneath the Baroque high altar is a crypt, which contains the coffins of 13 members of the Habsburg family.

== Burials ==
- Siegfried I, Count of Sponheim
- Herman, Duke of Carinthia
- Bernhard von Spanheim
- Leopold III, Duke of Austria
- Elisabeth of Carinthia, Queen of the Romans

== See also ==
St. Paul's Abbey in the Lavanttal commemorative coin

- St. Paul's Abbey in the Lavanttal was recently selected as the main motif of a very high value collectors' coin: the Austrian St. Paul's Abbey in the Lavanttal commemorative coin, minted on October 10, 2007. The obverse displays a view of the abbey buildings nestling on the wooded hill above the town while the reverse shows the South Portal of the church; built in 1618.
- The abbey possesses one of the largest collections of art in Europe, including graphics, coins, sacred art, and paintings by among others Rubens, Van Dyck, Dürer, Holbein and Kremser Schmidt, as well as an extensive and important library of over 180,000 books and manuscripts from between the 5th and 18th centuries.
- The Benedictines of St. Paul also run a secondary school ("Gymnasium").
- In 2010 the Benedictines of St. Paul published a music-production: "The Voices of God - Die Klanggesänge der Benediktiner/Stift St. Paul im Lavanttal", traditional Gregorian Chants with new instruments and compositions.
