= Genealogia Sponhemica =

The Genealogia Sponhemica (Oder Geschlecht Register der alten Graffen und Graffinnen zu Sponheim. Zusammengetragen, mit Anführung vieler merkwürdiger Geschichten 'illustriret', und dem Durchlauchtigsten Fürsten und Herren, Herren Georg Wilhelm Pfalzgraffen bey Rhein, Herzogen in Bayern, Graffen zu Veldenz und Sponheim u. unterthänigst 'presentiret', von Casp. Zillesio J. U. Lto. Consil. Palat. Sponheim. Die 21. Jun. Anno MDCLXIV.) is an official genealogical work of the House of Sponheim by Caspar Zillesius first presented in 1664 under Count Palatine George William of the Rhine, Count to Sponheim, and later reedited by the Archiv für rheinische Geschichte Coblenz in 1835 with revision of Johann Christian von Stramberg.

== Literature ==
- (in German) Genealogia Sponhemica. Archiv für rheinische Geschichte Coblenz, 1.1833 - 2.1835. Zweiter Teil 1835. http://www.dilibri.de/rlb/periodical/pageview/27862
- (in German) https://archivalia.hypotheses.org/3517
