= St. Paul im Lavanttal =

- Municipality
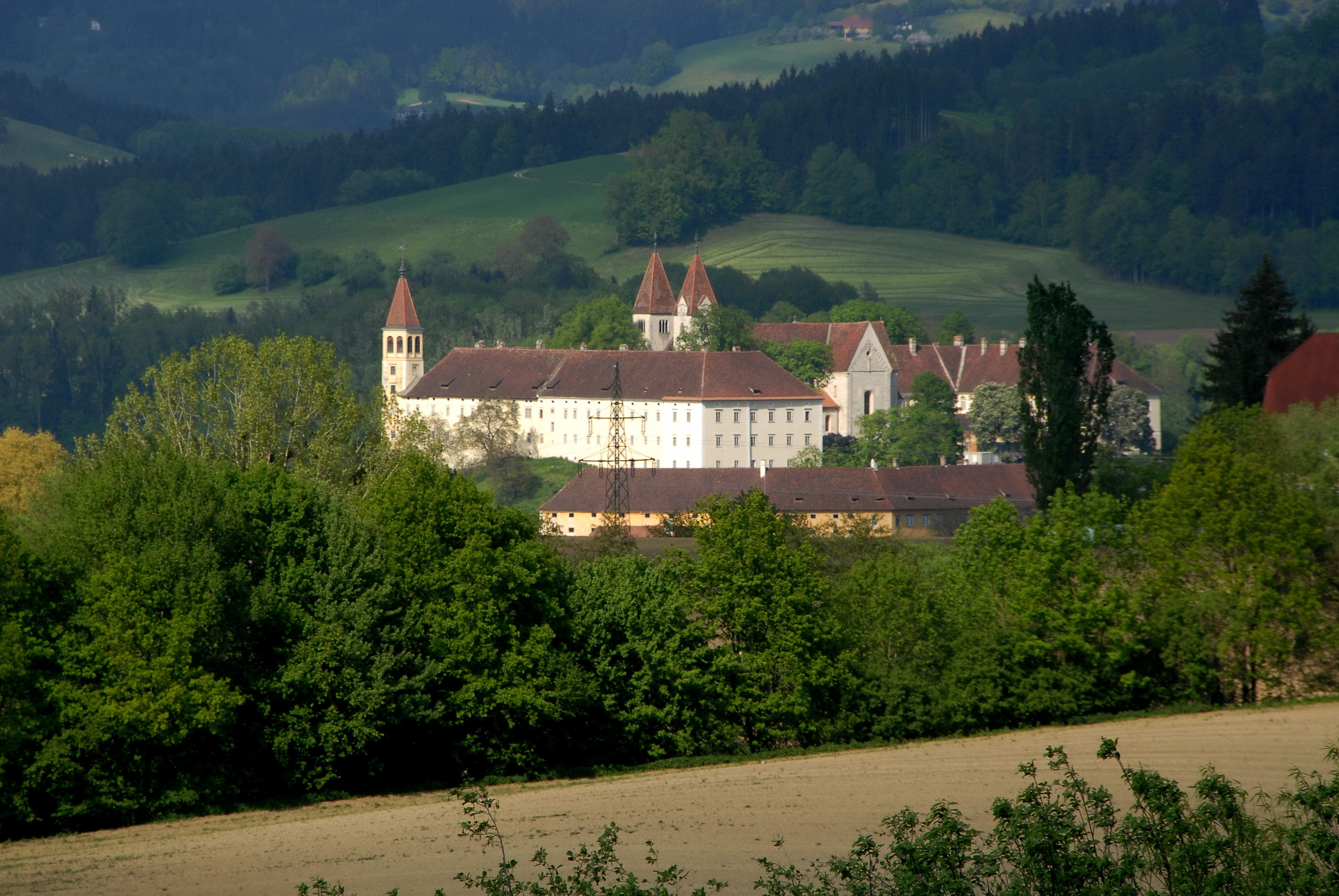

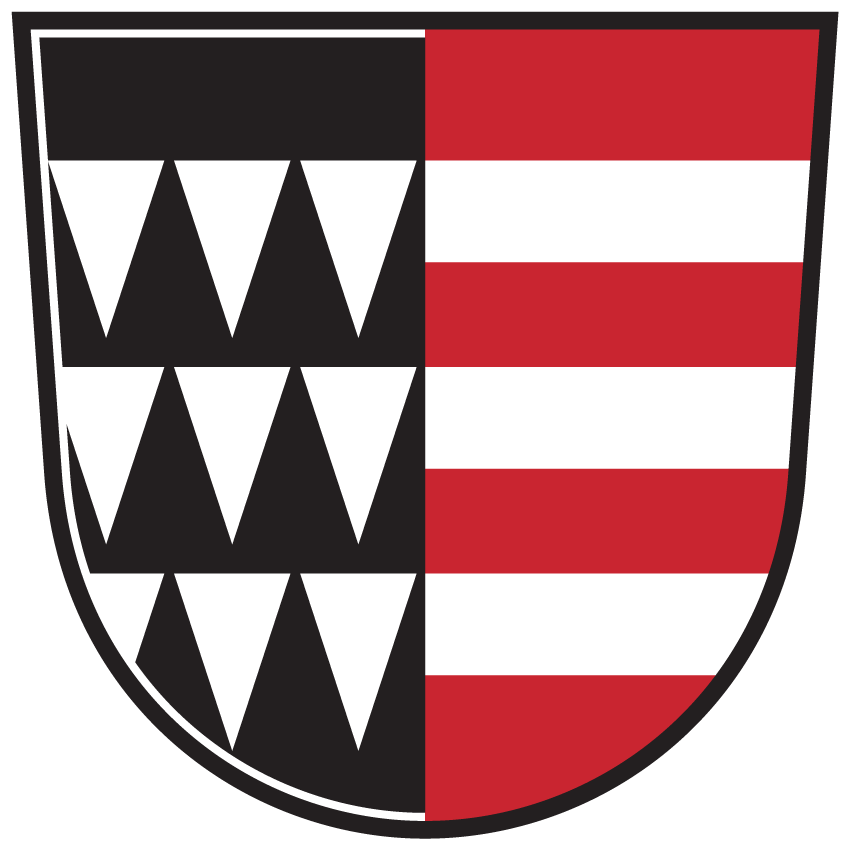
- Coat of arms

- Location within Austria
- Coordinates: 46°42′N 14°52′E
- Country: Austria
- State: Carinthia
- District: Wolfsberg

Government
  - Mayor: Hermann Primus

Area
  - Total: 47.34 km^{2} (18.28 sq mi)
- Elevation: 412 m (1,352 ft)

Population (2018-01-01)
  - Total: 3,303
  - Density: 69.77/km^{2} (180.7/sq mi)
- Time zone: UTC+1 (CET)
  - Summer (DST): UTC+2 (CEST)
- Postal code: 9470
- Area code: 04357
- Website: [*http://www.sanktpaul.at]

St. Paul im Lavanttal (Slovene: Sveti Pavel or Šentpavel) is a municipality of the Wolfsberg district in the Austrian state of Carinthia.

== Geography ==
St. Paul lies in the Lavant River valley. A large part of the municipality lies in the Granitz River valley and in the foothills of the Saualp.

== History ==
The village has always been under the influence of the monastery, which is still a significant economic factor today.

It was only in 1874 that the telegraph came to St. Paul. The opening of a k.k. State telegraph station with "limited daily services" took place at the same time as in other smaller places of the monarchy.

== Sights ==
- St. Paul's Abbey in the Lavanttal
- Ruins of Rabenstein Castle

== See also ==
- List of cities and towns in Austria
