= Donald C. Jackman =

American medievalist and linguist (1954–2023)

Donald Charles Jackman (born London, 15 January 1954, died State College, 14 January 2023) was an American medievalist and linguist of Australian background.

Donald C. Jackman received his Ph.D. in 1987 from Columbia University with the dissertation titled The Konradiner: a study in genealogical methodology dealing with the family of the Conradines. He also later earned the M.A. in applied linguistics and worked as a linguistic supervisor for several years at the Pennsylvania State University. As a historian he concentrated especially on the heritability principle as long-time critic of Eduard Hlawitschka and defender of the thesis of Armin Wolf concerning the genesis of the imperial college of electors. In 2006 he founded the internet publishing house Editions Enlaplage, originally as a conduit for extended investigations into inherited right in the aristocracy of the central Middle Ages.

== Works ==
- The Konradiner. A Study in Genealogical Methodology, Frankfurt am Main 1990, ISBN 3-465-02226-2.
- Das Eherecht und der frühdeutsche Adel, in: Zeitschrift der Savigny-Stiftung für Rechtsgeschichte, Germanistische Abteilung 112, 1995, S. 158–201.
- Criticism and Critique: Sidelights on the Konradiner, Unit for Prosopographical Research, Linacre College, Prosopographia et Genealogica, Band 1, Oxford 1997, ISBN 1-900934-00-0.
- Systematic Extension in Latin Relationship Terminology, in: Prosopon Newsletter 8, 1997,
- Lotharingian Lions: Prosopography with a Heraldic Slant, in: Prosopon Newsletter 9, 1998,
- A Greco-Roman Onomastic Fund, in: Katharine Keats-Rohan and Christian Settipani : Onomastique et parenté dans l'Occident médiéval, 2000, ISBN 1-900934-01-9.
- Cousins of the German Carolingians, in: Katharine Keats-Rohan und Christian Settipani : Onomastique et parenté dans l'Occident médiéval, 2000, ISBN 1-900934-01-9.
- Archiepiscopal Counts of Cologne: A Stage of Constitutional Transition? in: Prosopon Newsletters 11, 2000
- König Konrad, die letzten Karolinger und ihre sächsischen Verwandten, in: Hans-Werner Goetz (Hg.) : Konrad I. - Auf dem Weg zum "Deutschen Reich"?, 2006, S.77–92.
- The Konradiner and Their Hessian Heirs: An Annotated Table, Archive for Medieval Prosopography 1, ISBN 978-1-936466-51-1
- Ius hereditarium Encountered, Part I: The Meingaud-Walaho Inheritance, Archive for Medieval Prosopography 2, ISBN 978-1-936466-52-8, and others in the same series (ISSN 1936-1181).
- Comparative Accuracy, 978-1-936466-81-8, in the series entitled Historicity (ISSN 1940-9451).

== Sources ==
- Eduard Hlawitschka: Der Thronwechsel des Jahres 1002 und die Konradiner. Eine Auseinandersetzung mit zwei Arbeiten von Armin Wolf und Donald C. Jackman, in: ZRG Germ. Abt. 110 (1993) S. 149-248.
- Eduard Hlawitschka: Konradiner-Genealogie, unstatthafte Verwandtenehen und spätottonisch-frühsalischs Thronbesetzungspraxis. Ein Rückblick auf 25 Jahre Forschungsdisput. Monumenta Germaniae Historica Studien und Texte 32, XX und 220 S. Hannover 2003 ISBN 3-7752-5732-2; Besprechung dazu
