= Engelbert I, Margrave of Istria =

Margrave of Istria (1090–1096)

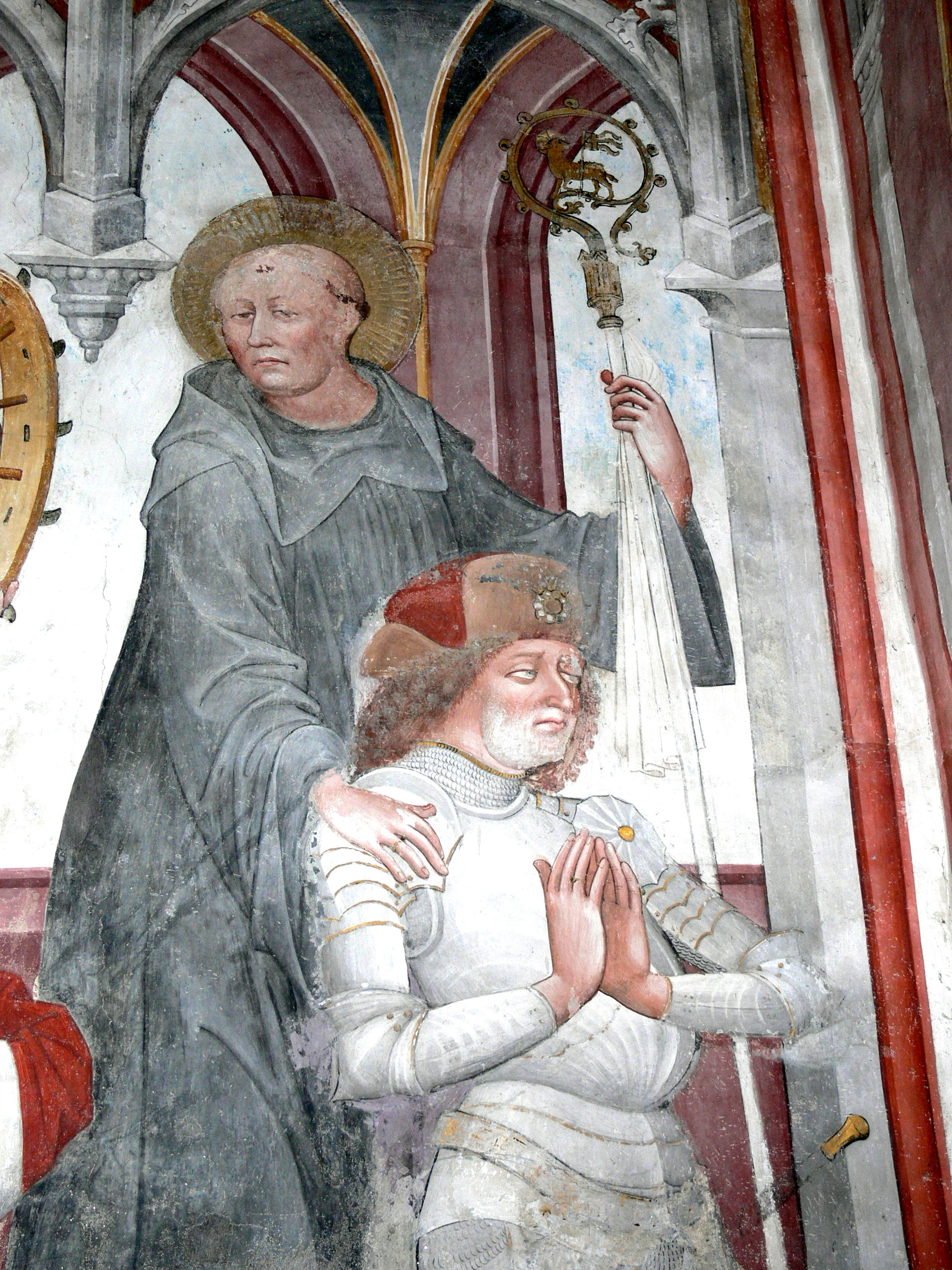
Saint Paul abbey church. Dedication fresco by Thomas von Villach ( 1493 ): Detail showing the donator of the abbey, count Engelbert of Sponheim, with his patron saint Benedict of Nursia.

Engelbert I (died 1 April 1096 in Saint Paul's Abbey, Lavanttal) was Margrave of Istria (1090–1096), Count of Sponheim, Kraichgau, and Pustertal and Vogt of the Archbishopric of Salzburg. As a supporter of Pope Gregory VII during the Investiture Controversy, he lost the county of Pustertal. In 1091, Engelbert founded the Benedictine monastery of St. Paul. He retired as a monk there in 1095 and died in 1096.

== Life and work ==
Engelbert was the eldest son of Siegfried I, Count of Sponheim and Richardis of Lavant, heiress of Count Engelbert IV. In 1065 he followed the Zeisolf-Wolframs as a count in the Kraichgau, from 1070 he is documented as a count in the Pustertal. In the Investiture Controversy he belonged with his brothers to the party of the South Germans supporting Pope Gregory VII and, as a supporter of the Archbishop of Salzburg, Gebhard von Helfenstein, fought in the years 1085 and 1086 against the imperial appointed counter-bishop Berthold von Moosburg. In 1086 he succeeded in bringing Archbishop Gebhard back to Salzburg from exile. As a result of his position in the Investiture Controversy, Engelbert was relieved of the district of Pustertal by Emperor Henry IV in 1091, which the Emperor then gave to the Bishop Burkhard von Brixen.

On 1 May 1091, Engelbert founded the Benedictine monastery of St. Paul, inhabited by monks from Hirsau and their Abbot Wezilo. This monastery became the house monastery of the Sponheimers, who continued to give it rich gifts. It is also the oldest burial sites of the House of Sponheim and their descendants are found there.

In April 1095 Engelbert joined St. Paul monastery as a monk. He died there on 1 April 1096.

== Descendants ==
Engelbert was married to Hedwig, possibly a daughter of Bernard II of Saxony. They had:

- Bernhard of Trixen (d 1147), Count of Trixen
- Richarda (d around 1112), married Count Berthold I of Schwarzenburg (d.1090), secondly married Poppo II, Margrave of Carniola (d. 1107), thirdly married Gebhard I, Count of Reichenhall (d. 1102)
- Henry IV, Duke of Carinthia, (1122–1123),
- Engelbert II (d. 1141), Margrave of Istria (1103–1134), Duke of Carinthia (1123–1135), married Uta daughter of Ulric of Passau
- Siegfried II (d 1132), Count of Spanheim-Lebenau
- Hartwig (d 1126), Bishop of Regensburg (1105–1126)
- Diemut, married Meginhard, Count of Lurn

== Sources ==
- Loud, Graham A.; Schenk, Jochen, eds. (2017). The Origins of the German Principalities, 1100-1350: Essays by German Historians. Routledge. ISBN 978-0367879501.
- Ogris, Alfred (2011). Wadl, Wilhelm (ed.). Auf Spurensuche in Kärntens Geschichte: Diskussionen und Kontroversen (in German). Verlag des Kärntner Landesarchivs. ISBN 9783900531799.
- Paulus, Christof (2007). Das Pfalzgrafenamt in Bayern im Frühen und Hohen Mittelalter (in German). Brill. ISBN 9783769668759.
- Robinson, I. S. (2003). Henry IV of Germany 1056-1106. Cambridge University Press. ISBN 9780521545907.
- Schennach, Martin P. (2010). Gesetz und Herrschaft: die Entstehung des Gesetzgebungsstaates am Beispiel Tirols (in German). Bohlau. ISBN 9783412206352.
- Štih, Peter (2010). The Middle Ages between the Eastern Alps and the Northern Adriatic. Brill. ISBN 978-9004185913.
- Thiele, Andreas (1994). Narrative genealogical family tables on European history (in German). Vol. 1: German imperial, royal, ducal and count houses (2nd ed.). R. G. Fischer. ISBN 3-89501-023-5.
