= Sponheim Castle =

- Burg Sponheim
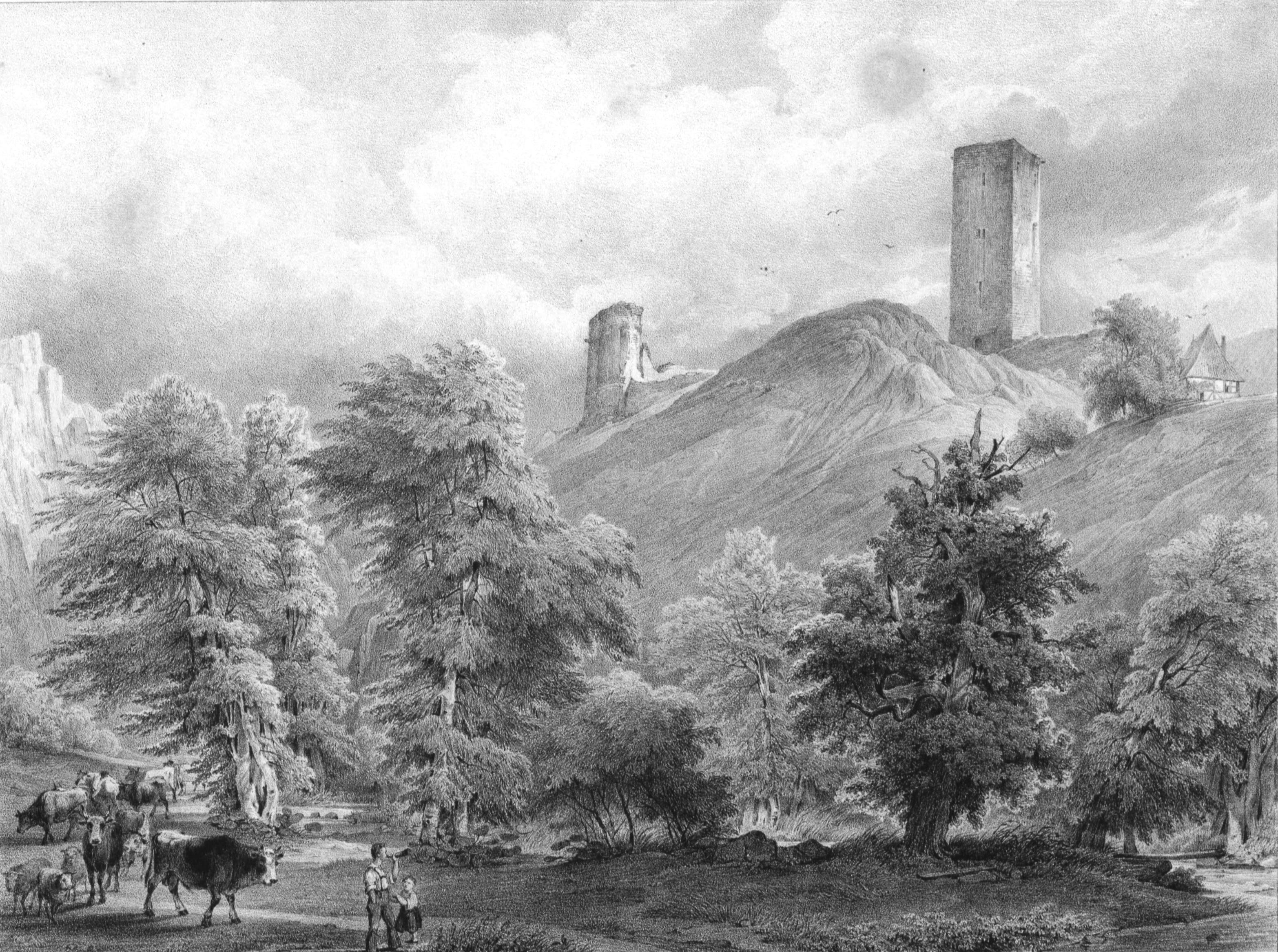
- J. C. Scheuren, Ruins of Sponheim Castle, 1834
- Interactive map of the Sponheim Castle area

General information
- Architectural style: Spur castle
- Location: Burgsponheim, Rhineland-Palatinate, Germany
- Coordinates: 49°49′53.5″N 7°42′53″E
- Completed: 12th century
- Landlord: Counts of Sponheim

Technical details
- Structural system: Rough-hewn masonry

Sponheim Castle (German: Burg Sponheim) is a medieval ruin in Burgsponheim on the edge of the Hunsrück mountain range in Rhineland-Palatinate, Germany. From the 12th century it was the original residence of the Counts of Sponheim. Significant portions of the castle remain standing.

== Site ==
The castle stands on a crag, approximately 250 meters long, around which the Ellerbach stream, a tributary of the Nahe, flows on the south and east sides. The ruin is on the peak of the crag, which is roughly 150 meters high.

== History ==
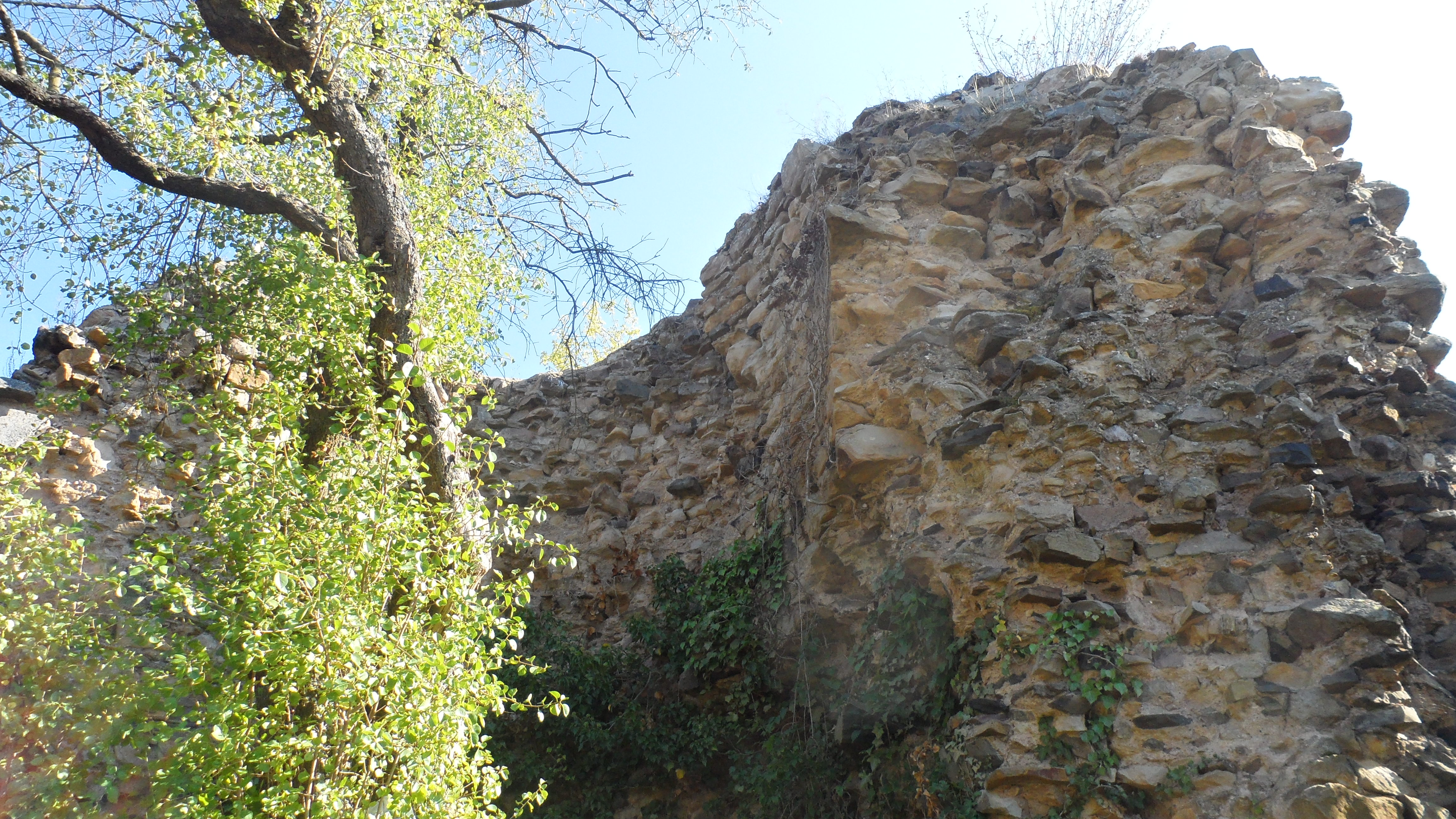
Remnants of the watchtower

The castle was probably already built in the 11th century and is first mentioned in two documents of 1127. In the 12th century it was extended and became the residence of the Counts of Sponheim. Upon the partition of the county in the early 13th century, the castle lost its importance, becoming the seat of comital ministeriales. The existence of a castle chapel is documented in an indulgence dated 1300.

When the ruling male line of the Rhenish branch of the House of Sponheim became extinct in 1437, the castle became a joint jurisdiction of the Margraves of Baden and the Counts of Veldenz, whose territories were inherited by Count Palatine Frederick I of Simmern in 1444 and held by the House of Palatinate-Zweibrücken. In the Thirty Years' War the castle was besieged by Spanish troops under Ambrogio Spinola in 1620, which may have caused some destruction.

== Layout ==
Within a ring wall, the castle comprised a residential section, a round tower, and a strongly fortified rectangular keep, provided for habitation purposes with privy, enlarged windows, and fireplaces. The keep was constructed of rough-hewn stone and dates roughly to the mid-12th century. Other towers with rough-hewn masonry are found only south of the River Nahe.

== Sources ==
- Köhl, Stefan: "Burg Sponheim", in Burgen und Schlösser 1992 volume 1, pp. 6–19
