= Waldböckelheim =

- Municipality
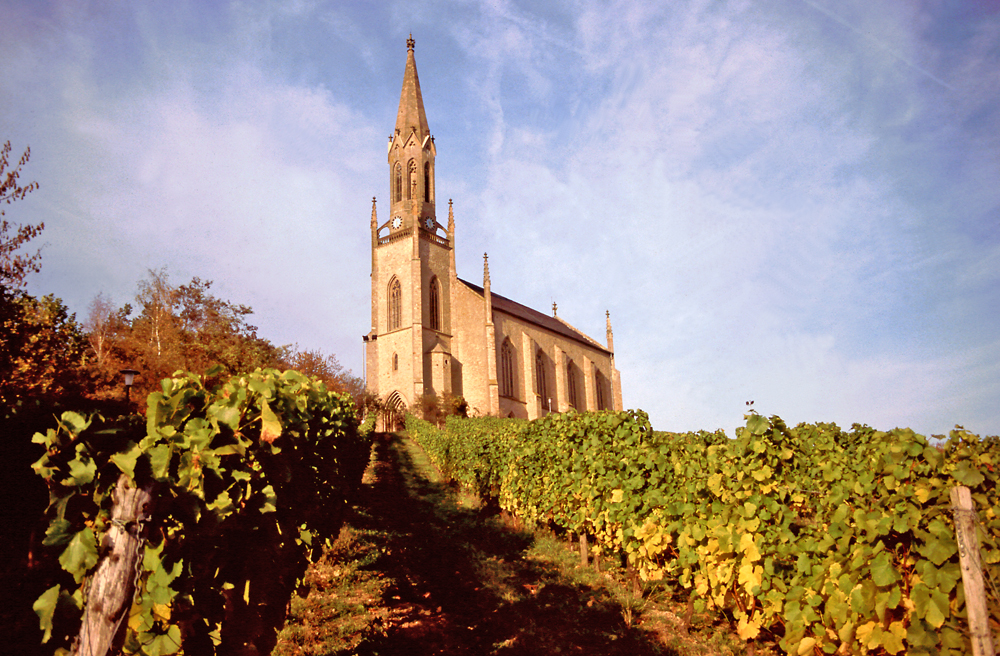

- Coat of arms

- Location of Waldböckelheim within Bad Kreuznach district
- Interactive map of Waldböckelheim
- Location within Germany Location within Rhineland-Palatinate
- Coordinates: 49°49′04″N 7°43′02″E
- Country: Germany
- State: Rhineland-Palatinate
- District: Bad Kreuznach
- Municipal assoc.: Rüdesheim

Government
  - Mayor (2019–24): Helmut Schmidt (SPD)

Area
  - Total: 18.58 km^{2} (7.17 sq mi)
- Elevation: 195 m (640 ft)

Population (2025-12-31)
  - Total: 2,199
  - Density: 118.4/km^{2} (306.5/sq mi)
- Time zone: UTC+01:00 (CET)
  - Summer (DST): UTC+02:00 (CEST)
- Postal codes: 55596
- Dialling codes: 06758
- Vehicle registration: KH
- Website: www.waldboeckelheim.de

Waldböckelheim is a municipality in the district of Bad Kreuznach in Rhineland-Palatinate, in western Germany.

== Geography ==
Waldböckelheim is located north of the Nahe in the Rhenish Massif. Waldböckelheim is surrounded by three extinct volcanoes.

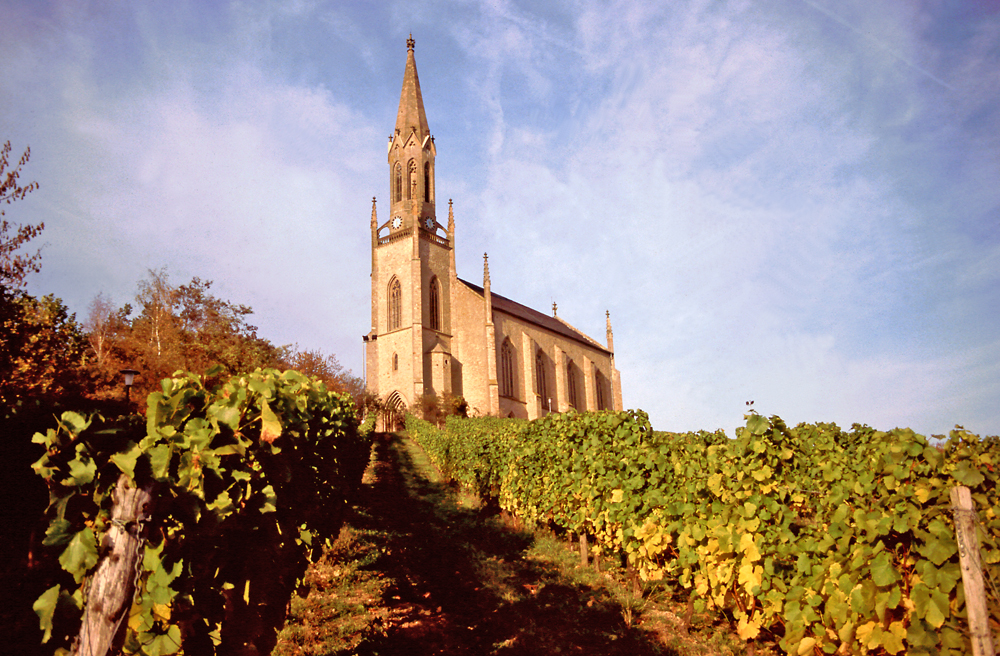
The Evangelical Church of Waldböckelheim

== History ==
It was mentioned first on 10 February 824 Becchilenheim. The prefix Wald (forest) was prefixed in the 13th century to distinguish themselves from Gau-Bickelheim. In the castle Böckelheim was Emperor Henry IV prisoner of his son in December 1105. The office Bockelheim was formed together with the surrounding villages. After changing ownership several times, it belonged more than 300 years to the Electorate of the Palatinate.

== Economy ==
In Waldböckelheim there are two kindergartens, one primary, a Regionale Schule and a voluntary fire brigade.
