= Sponheim =

- Municipality
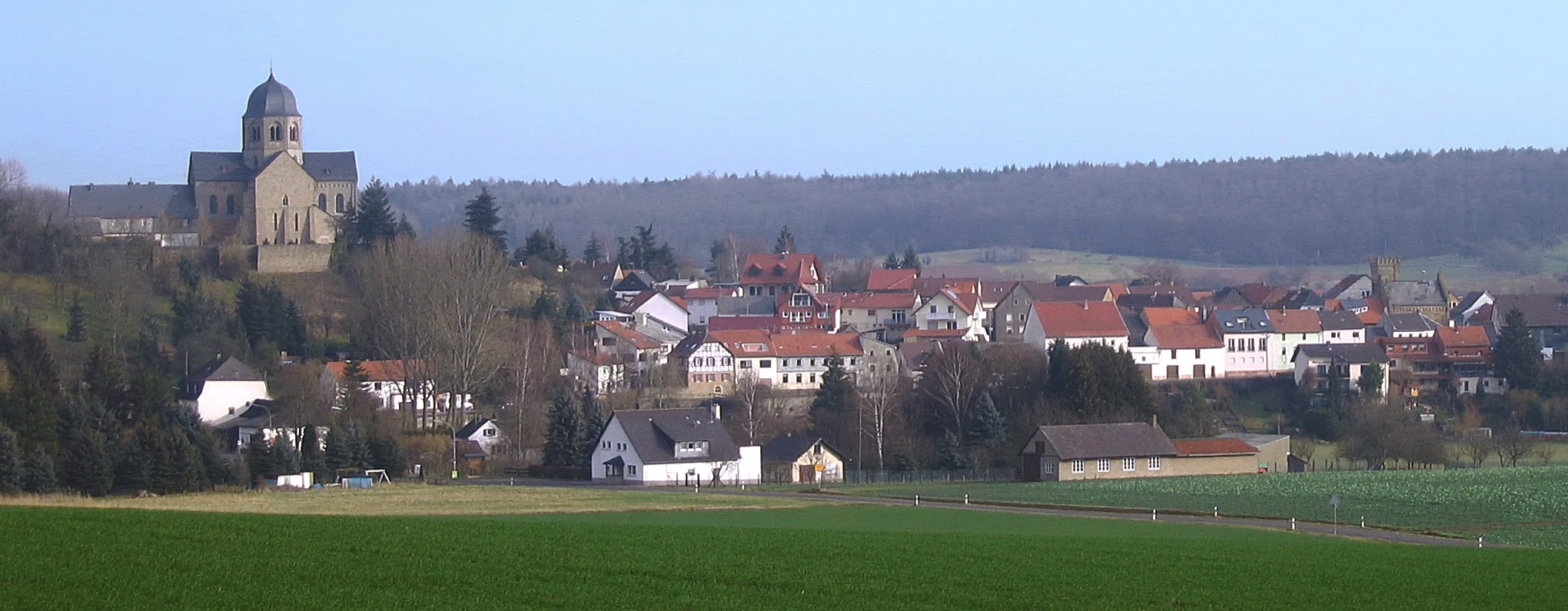
- View of Sponheim with the abbey

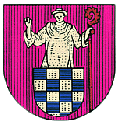
- Coat of arms

- Location of Sponheim within Bad Kreuznach district
- Interactive map of Sponheim
- Location within Germany Location within Rhineland-Palatinate
- Coordinates: 49°50′45″N 7°43′35″E
- Country: Germany
- State: Rhineland-Palatinate
- District: Bad Kreuznach
- Municipal assoc.: Rüdesheim

Government
  - Mayor (2019–24): Bernhard Haas

Area
  - Total: 14.35 km^{2} (5.54 sq mi)
- Elevation: 230 m (750 ft)

Population (2025-12-31)
  - Total: 760
  - Density: 53/km^{2} (140/sq mi)
- Time zone: UTC+01:00 (CET)
  - Summer (DST): UTC+02:00 (CEST)
- Postal codes: 55595
- Dialling codes: 06758
- Vehicle registration: KH
- Website: www.sponheim.de

Sponheim is a municipality in the district of Bad Kreuznach in Rhineland-Palatinate in western Germany.

== History ==
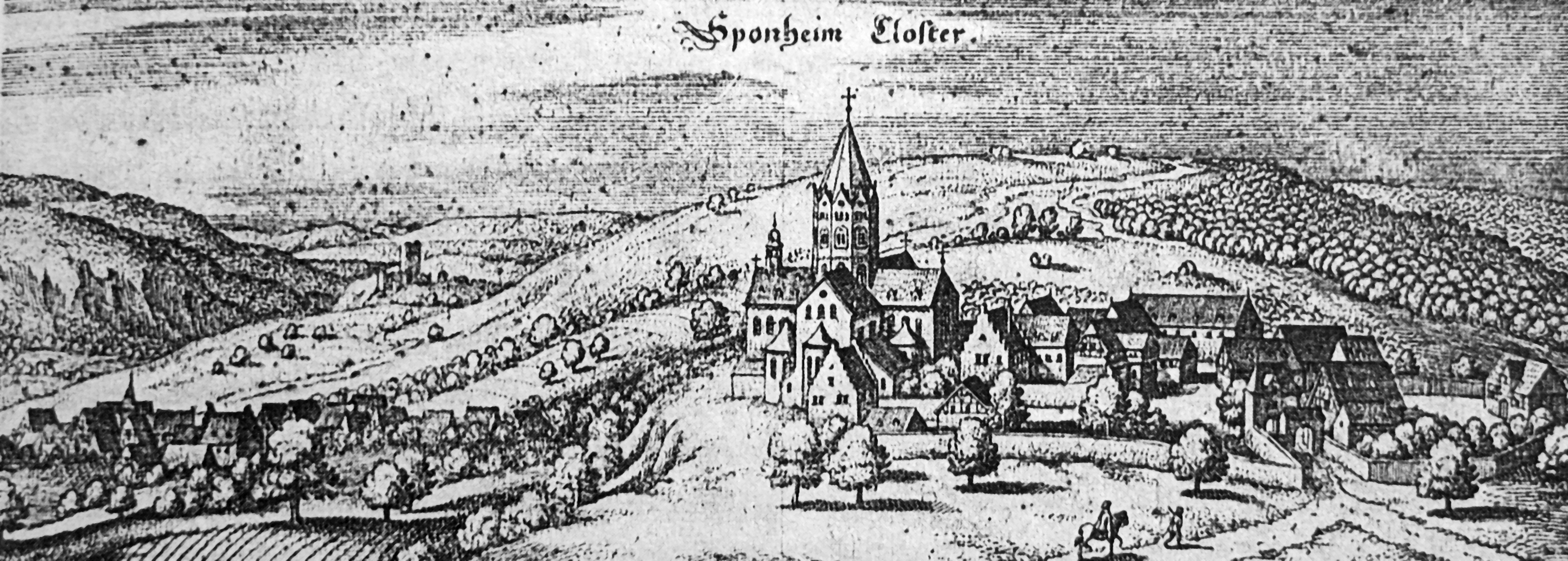
Abbey of Sponheim c. 1650

Sponheim was the capital of the County of Sponheim.

=== Sponheim Abbey ===
There was a Benedictine abbey which was founded in 1101 by Stephan II, Count of Sponheim not far from the comital residence at Castle Sponheim. Johannes Trithemius was one of the abbots. Traveling from university to his home town in 1482, he was surprised by a snowstorm and took refuge in the Benedictine abbey of Sponheim near Bad Kreuznach. He decided to stay and was elected abbot in 1483, at the age of twenty-one. In his time, the abbey library increased from around fifty items to more than two thousand. However, his efforts were not met with praise, and his reputation as a magician did not further his acceptance. Increasing differences with the convent led to his resignation in 1506.

== See also ==
- County of Sponheim
- House of Sponheim
