= List of counts at Sponheim =

Coat of arms of the House of Sponheim

The County of Sponheim went through roughly three main phases during the course of the centuries. The first one lasted from the beginnings in the 11th century until the first divisions of the county between two Sponheimish lines around 1234. In this first period the region was ruled by a single count.

In the second phase the county was managed by two counts. The “Further” County (Vordere Grafschaft) of Sponheim was ruled by the line Sponheim-Kreuznach with residence at Castle Kauzenburg near Kreuznach. The "Hinder" County (Hintere Grafschaft) of Sponheim was ruled by the Sponheim-Starkenburg line, with residence at first at Castle Starkenburg near Enkirch and after 1350 at Castle Grevenburg near Trarbach. This phase lasted nearly to the extinction of both lines in 1437.

Finally in the third phase both parts of the county were managed by joint rulers as a condominium. The management of the “Hinder” County of Sponheim was divided between a collateral palatine line (House of Palatinate-Simmern, later House of Palatinate-Zweibrücken, later still House of Palatinate-Birkenfeld) and Baden, the management of the “Further” County of Sponheim roughly between Baden and the Electoral Palatinate. The ruling houses of the Sponheimish condominium were matrilineal descendants of the House of Sponheim and took on the title of Count at Sponheim (Graf zu Sponheim).

== Counts of Sponheim ==
=== House of Sponheim ===
==== Division of Sponheim under House of Sponheim rule ====
County of Sponheim (1st creation) (c.1030-1218)
| County of Upper Sponheim (1218-1417) | County of Lower Sponheim (1218-1417) |
County of Sponheim (2nd creation) (1417-1437)

==== Table of rulers ====
| Ruler | Born | Reign | Death | Ruling part | Consort | Notes |
|---|---|---|---|---|---|---|
| Eberhard I | c.990? ? | c.1030? – 1044 | County of Sponheim | Hedwig of Nellenburg at least one child | 1044 aged 53-54 | First known count of the family. |
| Siegfried I | c.1010? First son of Eberhard I and Hedwig of Nellenburg | 1044 – 7 February 1065 | County of Sponheim | Richardis of Lavanttal four children | 7 February 1065 aged 54-55 | Also Count in the Puster Valley and Margrave of the Hungarian March |
| Stephen I | c.1020? (Possible) Second son of Eberhard I and Hedwig of Nellenburg | 7 February 1065 – 1080 | County of Sponheim | ? of Stromberg at least one child | 1080 aged 59-60 | Possibly a brother or a cousin of Siegfried. |
| Stephen II | c.1050? Son of Stephen I | 1080 – 1118 | County of Sponheim | Sophia of Formbach c.1092 five children | 1118 aged 67-68 | |
| Meginhard I | c.1085 Son of Stephen II and Sophia of Formbach | 1118 – 1136 | County of Sponheim | Matilda of Mörsberg-Nellenburg four children | 1136 aged 50-51 | Also Count of Winterthur. |
| Gottfried I | c.1115 Son of Meginhard I and Matilda of Mörsberg-Nellenburg | 1136 – 1159 | County of Sponheim | Matilda of Lorraine? eight children | 1159 aged 43-44 | |
| Gottfried II | c.1140 Son of Gottfried I and Matilda of Lorraine | 1159 – 1183 | County of Sponheim | ? of Veldenz seven children | 1183 aged 42-43 | |
| Council of Regency (1183-1189) | | | | | | Died during the Fifth Crusade. After his death, his children split the Sponheim domains. |
| Gottfried III | c.1175 Son of Gottfried II | 1183 – 1218 | County of Sponheim | Adelaide, Countess of Sayn; 1202 five children | c.1218 aged 42-43 | Died during the Fifth Crusade. After his death, his children split the Sponheim domains. |
| John I | c.1205 First son of Gottfried III and Adelaide of Sayn | 1218 – 1266 | County of Upper Sponheim | ? of Altena-Isenberg five children | 1266 aged 60-61 | Children of Gottfried III, divided the county. John inherited the Upper part with residence in Starkenburg; Simon inherited the Lower part with residence in Kreuznach. |
| Simon I | c.1210 Second son of Gottfried III and Adelaide of Sayn | 1218 – 8 April 1264 | County of Lower Sponheim | Margaret of Hengebach (1225-1290); 11 December 1240 six children | 8 April 1264 aged 53-54 | Children of Gottfried III, divided the county. John inherited the Upper part with residence in Starkenburg; Simon inherited the Lower part with residence in Kreuznach. |
| John I the Lame | c.1245 Son of Simon I and Margaret of Hengebach | 8 April 1264 – 28 January 1290 | County of Lower Sponheim | Adelaide of Leiningen-Landeck; 15 March 1265 seven children | 28 January 1290 aged 44-45 | |
| Henry I | c.1235 Son of John I | 1266 – 1 August 1289 | County of Upper Sponheim | Blancheflor of Julich three/four children | 1 August 1289 aged 53-54 | |
| John II | c.1265 Son of Henry I and Blancheflor of Julich | 1 August 1289 – March 1324 | County of Upper Sponheim | Catherine of Ochsenstein (d.1313); 3 June 1290 three children | March 1324 aged 58-59 | Father and son, co-rulers. Henry predeceased John, and he was succeeded by his minor grandchild. |
| Henry II the Younger | c.1295 Son of John II and Catherine of Ochsenstein | c.1310 – October 1323 | County of Upper Sponheim | Lauretta of Salm; January 1315 one child | October 1323 aged 27-28 | Father and son, co-rulers. Henry predeceased John, and he was succeeded by his minor grandchild. |
| Simon II | c.1270 First son of John I and Adelaide of Leiningen-Landeck | 28 January 1290 – 1336 | County of Lower Sponheim (at Kastellaun) | Elisabeth of Falkenburg; November 1293 nine children | 1336; Kastellaun aged 65-66 | Sons of John I, shared rule in the county, from their separate residences. |
| John II | c.1270 Second son of John I and Adelaide of Leiningen-Landeck | 1290 – 11 March 1340 | County of Lower Sponheim (at Kreuznach) | Unmarried | 11 March 1340 aged 69-70 | Sons of John I, shared rule in the county, from their separate residences. |
| Regency of Lauretta of Salm (1324-1331) | | | | | | Lauretta was regent in name of her child, John III. In spite of being engaged in a trial of strength with one of the most powerful and influential princes of her time, the Elector of Trier Baldwin of Luxembourg, she devoted herself to putting Sponheim on a firm political and economic footing. |
| John III The Elder | c.1315 Son of Henry II and Loretta of Salm | March 1324 – 30 December 1398 | County of Upper Sponheim | Matilda of the Palatinate; 1331 three children | 30 December 1398 aged 82-83 | Lauretta was regent in name of her child, John III. In spite of being engaged in a trial of strength with one of the most powerful and influential princes of her time, the Elector of Trier Baldwin of Luxembourg, she devoted herself to putting Sponheim on a firm political and economic footing. |
| Waleran | 1305; Kastellaun; Son of Simon II and Elisabeth of Falkenburg | 1336 – 13 February 1380 | County of Lower Sponheim | Elisabeth of Katzenelnbogen; 9 August 1330 six children | 13 February 1380 aged 74-75 | Inherited the domains of his father (Kastellaun) and uncle (Kreuznach). |
| Simon III | c.1335 Son of Waleran and Elisabeth of Katzenelnbogen | 13 February 1380 – 30 August 1414 | County of Lower Sponheim | Maria of Vianden (1337 – 21 October 1400); 23 July 1348 three children | 30 August 1414 aged 78-79 | |
| John IV | c.1335 Son of John III and Matilda of the Palatinate | 30 December 1398 – 1411 | Conty of Upper Sponheim | Elisabeth of Sponheim-Kreuznach (d.18 April 1395); 1346 one child | 1411 aged 75-76 | |
| Elisabeth | 1365; Daughter of Simon III and Maria of Vianden | 30 August 1414 – 31 July 1417 | County of Lower Sponheim | Engelbert III of the Mark; 5 April 1381 no children Rupert Pepin of the Palatinate; 1392; Alzey no children | 31 July 1417; Kreuznach aged 51-52 | After her death, her estates were reunited with those of the Upper Sponheim line. |
| John V | 1359; Son of John IV and Elisabeth of Sponheim-Kreuznach | 1411 – 24 October 1437 | County of Sponheim (at Upper Sponheim until 1417) | Walpurga of Leiningen c.1415 five children | 24 October 1437 aged 75-76 | In 1417, after the death of Countess Elisabeth of Lower Sponheim, he reunited Sponheim once more, but died with no descendants. The family became extinct. The county was divided between the heirs of his father's sisters (Matilda and Lauretta): the Margraves of Baden and the Lords of Veldenz. |

== Successors in Upper and Lower Sponheim ==
| Upper Sponheim | Lower Sponheim |
|---|---|
| Palatinate-Veldenz: Frederick III, Count at Veldenz and Sponheim (1437–1444); Palatinate-Simmern/-Birkenfeld/-Zweibrücken: Frederick I, Count Palatine (1444–1480); John I (1480–1509); John II (1509–1557); Frederick II, 1559 Prince Elector Frederick III (1557–1560), as pledgeholder 1569 to 1571; Palatinate-Zweibrücken: Wolfgang at Veldenz (1560–1569); John I (1569–1584 as regent to his brother Charles I); Palatinate-Birkenfeld: Charles I at Birkenfeld (1584–1600); George William (1600–1669), until 1618 under custody; Charles II Otto (1669–1671); (Palatinate-Birkenfeld-Bischweiler receives Birkenfeld): Christian II at Bischweiler (1671–1717); (Palatinate-Bischweiler-Birkenfeld acquires Zweibrücken): Christian III, since 1731 at Zweibrücken (1717–1735); Christian IV (1735–1775); Charles III Augustus Christian (1775–1795); Maximilian I (IV) Joseph, Prince Elector of Palatinate-Bavaria, 1806 King of Bavaria, heir 1799 also to the share of the “Further” County; Baden: James I (1437–1453); Charles I (1453–1475); Christoph I (1475–1527); Bernard III at Baden (1527–1536); Philibert (1536–1569); Philip II (1569–1588); Edward Fortunatus (1588–1600) (1600–1605 no Badish joint ruler); George Frederick at Durlach (1605–1622); William (1622–1677); Louis William (1677–1683), brother (Always campaigning abroad from 1683 to 1697, the Baden share was held by his uncle Leopold Wilhelm's widow, Margravine Marie Francisca b. Countess of Fürstenberg); Louis George (1697–1761); Augustus George (1761–1771); Charles Frederick (1771–1811) | Electoral Palatinate: Louis IV (1437–1449); Frederick I (1449–1476), at first regent; 1451 Prince Elector; Philip (1476–1508); Louis V (1508–1544); Frederick II (1544–1556); Otto Henry (1556–1559); (Succession to Palatinate-Simmern line) Palatinate-Simmern: Frederick III, 1559 Prince Elector (1557–1576); Louis VI, Prince Elector (1576–1583); Frederick IV, Prince Elector (1583–1610); Louis Philip at Simmern (1610–1655), until 1622 single holder.; Louis Henry at Simmern (1655–1674); Charles I Louis, Prince Elector (1674–1680); Charles II, Prince Elector (1680–1685); (Extinction of the Simmern line, succession to Palatinate-Neuburg) Palatinate-Neuburg: Philip William, Prince Elector (1685–1690); John William, Prince Elector (1690–1716); Charles III Philip, Prince Elector (1716–1742); Charles Theodore, Prince Elector (1742–1799); (Rightful successor was Count Palatine Maximilian of Zweibrücken (see “Upper” County)) Baden-Baden: James I (1437–1453); Charles I (1453–1463) (1463 until January 1508 pledged to Electoral Palatinate); Philipp I (1508–1533) (1533/1534 disputed, 27 March 1534 to Baden-Baden); Bernard III (1534–1536); Philibert (1536–1569); Philipp II (1569–1588); Edward Fortunatus (1588–1600) (1600 until November 1622 no Badenish joint ruler, Electoral-Palatine holding only); William (1622–1677); Louis William (1677–1707); Louis George (1707–1761); Augustus George (1761–1771); (Extinction of the Baden-Baden line, succession falls to Baden-Durlach line): Charles Frederick (1771–1811) |
