= Gutenberg (disambiguation) =

Johannes Gutenberg (c. 1400–1468) was a German printer who invented effective mechanical printing.

Gutenberg may also refer to:

== People ==
- Gutenberg (surname)

== Places ==
- Gutenberg (crater), a crater on the Moon
- Gutenberg, Germany, a municipality in Rhineland-Palatinate, Germany
- Gutenberg an der Raabklamm, a municipality in Styria, Austria
- Gutenberg Castle, a castle in Liechtenstein
- Gutenburg Castle, a ruined castle in Gutenberg, Rhineland-Palatinate, Germany

== Education ==
- Gutenberg College, a four-year college in Eugene, Oregon, United States
- Gutenberg Museum, Mainz, Germany
- Project Gutenberg, a volunteer effort to digitize, archive, and distribute cultural works

== Other uses ==
- Gutenberg, a 1993 children's book by author and illustrator Leonard Everett Fisher
- Gutenberg Bible, printed by Johannes Gutenberg circa 1455
- Gutenberg! The Musical!, Broadway musical running in New York City
- The Gutenberg discontinuity, a seismic propagation discontinuity at the core–mantle boundary
- Gutenberg, the default editor of WordPress as of version 5.0 (2018)

== See also ==
- Guttenburg, a German brig wrecked on the Goodwin Sands on 1 January 1860
- Gutenburg (disambiguation)
- Guttenberg (disambiguation)
- Project Gutenberg (disambiguation)
