= Gutenberg, Germany =

Gutenberg
- Municipality
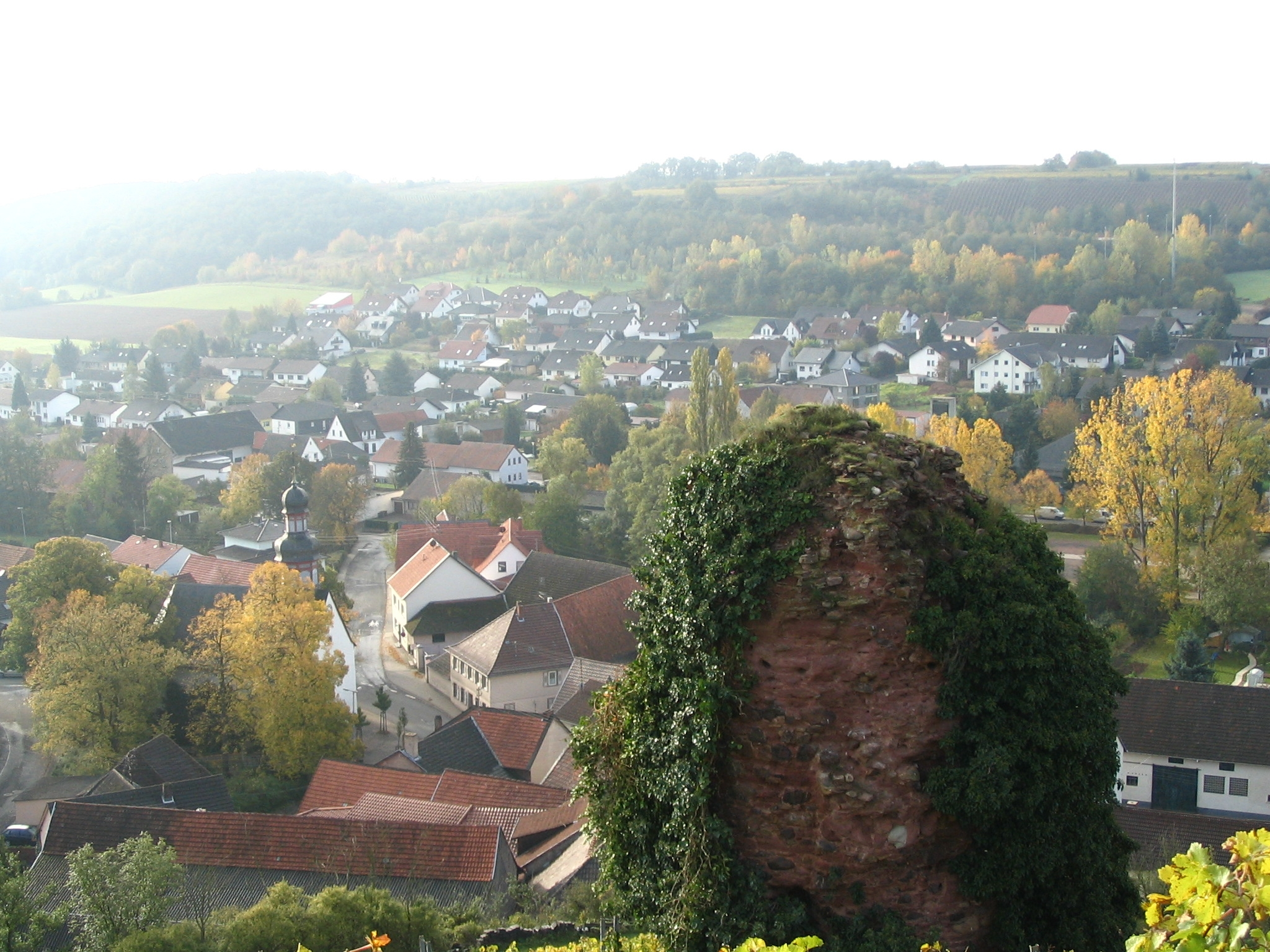

- Coat of arms

- Location of Gutenberg within Bad Kreuznach district
- Interactive map of Gutenberg
- Location within Germany Location within Rhineland-Palatinate
- Coordinates: 49°52′47″N 7°47′55″E
- Country: Germany
- State: Rhineland-Palatinate
- District: Bad Kreuznach
- Municipal assoc.: Rüdesheim

Government
  - Mayor (2019–24): Jürgen Frank

Area
  - Total: 4.18 km^{2} (1.61 sq mi)
- Elevation: 180 m (590 ft)

Population (2025-12-31)
  - Total: 1,029
  - Density: 246/km^{2} (638/sq mi)
- Time zone: UTC+01:00 (CET)
  - Summer (DST): UTC+02:00 (CEST)
- Postal codes: 55595
- Dialling codes: 06706
- Vehicle registration: KH
- Website: www.gutenberg-nahe.de

Gutenberg (German pronunciation: [ˈɡuːtn̩bɛʁk]) is an Ortsgemeinde – a municipality belonging to a Verbandsgemeinde, a kind of collective municipality – in the Bad Kreuznach district in Rhineland-Palatinate, Germany. It belongs to the Verbandsgemeinde of Rüdesheim, whose seat is in the municipality of Rüdesheim an der Nahe. Gutenberg is a winegrowing village.

== Geography ==
=== Location ===
Flowing through Gutenberg is the Gräfenbach. Gutenberg belongs to the Nahe wine region and lies at the foot of the Soonwald in the Hunsrück. Its elevation is roughly 145 m above sea level and it lies some 7 km from the district seat, Bad Kreuznach. Bad Sobernheim, Idar-Oberstein, Bad Münster am Stein-Ebernburg and Bingen am Rhein also lie relatively nearby. Gutenberg is distinguished by the consistency of its weather, low rainfall averaging only 480 mm yearly and many sunny days. This has led the municipality to adopt the slogan "Gutenberg – auf der Sonnenseite der Welt" ("Gutenberg – on the sunny side of the world").

=== Neighbouring municipalities ===
Clockwise from the north, Gutenberg's neighbours are the municipalities of Windesheim, Guldental, Hargesheim, Roxheim and Wallhausen, all of which likewise lie within the Bad Kreuznach district.

=== Constituent communities ===
Also belonging to Gutenberg is the outlying homestead of Nackmühle.

== History ==
=== Antiquity ===
Not much can be brought to light about the Gutenberg area's earliest settlers, who were nomads – hunter-gatherers – of the Old Stone Age, and they did not leave much behind for archaeologists to find. In the 1960s, however, a man named Kurt Hochgesand from Waldalgesheim discovered articles from several epochs of the Stone Age in the fields near the Butterberg. Unearthed over the years were parts of a shoe-last celt, a round scraper, flint blades, a crudely worked hoe, half and whole stone hatchets and several siliceous (perhaps chert) blades. The finds were investigated and written up in Mainz journals. Thereafter they were kept under Hochgesand's private ownership.

No finds from the Bronze Age were made within Gutenberg's limits are known. From the Iron Age, when the Celts migrated into the area, three archaeological finds are known: two arm rings and a neck ring from Hallstatt culture (700–450 BC). A man named Josef Wink found these objects in a sandpit in the Weißenborn. In the 1st century BC Julius Caesar conquered Gaul and advanced all the way to the Rhine. Thenceforth the Gutenberg area belonged to the Roman province of Germania Superior. Right at the northern municipal limit ran the old Roman road that led from Bad Kreuznach towards Stromberg, where it linked to the Mainz-Bingen-Trier road, the so-called Via Ausonia (locally, the Ausoniusstraße). It seems likely that the first Roman archaeological find in what is now Gutenberg was made in the 1620s. In an engraving by Sebastian Furck, published in 1630 in Daniel Meisner and Eberhard Kieser's Thesaurus Philopoliticus, appears a stone coffin similar to those unearthed at the Roman graveyard in Bad Kreuznach near today's Bosenheimerstraße. An inscription on the engraving reads "Ist alda mit einem cörper und zwei gläsern darin ein unbekannts materia auch vier schüßlin ausgegraben worden" ("Was dug up there with a body and two glasses therein an unknown material also four dishes"). What became of this coffin is unknown.

The next major find was not made until 1921. Phillip Stieb IV discovered on his field "im Bauernstück", likely while he was doing clearing work, two stone chests. Found inside were urns, bottles, small clay lamps, coins and rings from the 1st century AD. The finds were taken to Mainz and put in the Romano-Germanic Central Museum. In 1925, Gustav Behrens, the museum's caretaker of Rhenish-Hessian archaeological monuments, wrote them up in his museum guidebook Römische Gläser aus Deutschland ("Roman Glassware from Germany"). Today, this glassware can be found at the local history museum in Bad Kreuznach.

In 1925 the well known local historian Karl Geib undertook an investigation in his field, for which he turned to people who were interested in the subject. In Gutenberg, that was the schoolteacher Meyer. With the help of his answers on the prepared questionnaire it came to light that many archaeological finds from prehistoric and Roman times had been destroyed through people's ignorance.

In 1967, Karl Hochgesand made an interesting discovery on the Butterberg near the Roman road: During clearing work, a plough had struck some stone chests and had destroyed them. They were set aside and seemingly never seen again, until Hochgesand found them and reported this find to the local history museum. Found in the chests were a few Roman enamel fibulae as well as glass and beaker shards. Some of this remained in private ownership and some went to the local history museum. It is noteworthy that all prehistoric and Roman archaeological finds have come to light outside what is now the village. This likely has to do with the ongoing building over time, with new buildings replacing old ones in the village itself. Indeed, most of these finds were made near the old Roman road. Since not only Roman artifacts have been dug up there, but also even older ones, it seems clear that this road had been important for some time, even before the Romans came, and that the Romans simply improved the road. Who actually lived in the village in Roman times may well never be known with certainty, but these archaeological finds leave no doubt that this place was indeed inhabited then.

=== Name ===
The first mention of the village is as Weihersheim. In 1158, a place named Weihersheim had its first documentary mention. On 22 May of that year, Archbishop of Mainz Arnold confirmed to the convent of Ruppertsberg near Bingen its land holdings as they were donated by individual persons. Mentioned among other things were four manors at Weithersheim. This convent had been founded in 1149 by Saint Hildegard, who herself had grown up at Disibodenberg. Once again, in 1184, a place called Wertdersheim was mentioned in a document. Pope Lucius III therein likewise confirmed the donations to that convent, and along with them papal protection. In 1187, Wertdersheim appeared for the third time in a document that likewise dealt with the Ruppertsberg convent. Archbishop Cunrad of Mainz, a papal legate, freed the convent from taxes and furnished it with specific rights.

A clue to the location comes from yet another document, this one from the monastery at Bingen. It bears the title Registratio rerum et censum monasterii S. Rupperti ab anno 1147 usque 1270 and comprehensively lists all the convent's land holdings. For Weithersheim, 53 rural areas are named. Among others, it names "in hahnebach" and "in demo sewe". These cadastral names appear on modern maps within Gutenberg's limits, in modified or even the same forms as they had in the 13th century. The locality name "retro ecclesiam" also crops up, which is Latin. There was already a church at this time, Saint Margaret's (Kirche St. Margarete), which stood somewhat more to the northeast than today's church. Weithersheim appears to be Gutenberg, and sometime its name was changed.

It was once assumed that Weithersheim had been a village on the Butterberg that was later abandoned for a newer village called Gutenberg in the valley. Hochgesand's discoveries at the Butterberg, however, seem to belie that assumption, for all his finds were either prehistoric or Roman, and never mediaeval. Furthermore, a temporal overlap in the use of the two names may be noted. Records from Eberbach Abbey and Ruppertsberg, both of which had land holdings at Gutenberg, kept referring to the village as Weithersheim long after those from the Counts of Sponheim had begun using the names Burg Gutenberg and Tal Gutenberg ("castle" and "dale"), thus putting the lie to any notion that Weithersheim was abandoned and Gutenberg then built to replace it.

=== The Gutenburg ===
The local castle, known as The Gutenburg, is nowadays a ruin. Its construction date is disputed. Some hold that it was built at about the same time as the Dalburg (a castle near Dalberg). Others hold that it has a similar age to the Schöneberger Burg, another nearby, now largely vanished, castle in Schöneberg. Still others say that the tower on the slope dates back to Roman times.

=== Gutenberg under the Lords vom Stein ===
In 1213, Eberbach Abbey, then an important monastery near Eltville, found itself at odds with Bertha and her brother Rheinbodo of Bingen. At Saint Peter's Monastery near Kreuznach the two parties met in the presence of Lord Wolfram vom Stein and his son, also named Wolfram. Thereafter, a monk from the Breitenvahs Monastery (now Guldental's outlying homestead of Breitenfelser Hof) was supposed to hand over 10 pounds in denarii to the siblings from Bingen at Castle Weithersheim. In 1227, Wolfram the Elder (who, somewhat confusingly, was the younger of the two Wolframs mentioned above) decided to take part in the Crusades under Emperor Friedrich. Before he left, he made over to the monastery a further 28 Morgen of wildland that the monastery demanded and also two Morgen for his salvation. The problem, though, was that the land that he had signed over was not altogether his own. He shared ownership with his siblings. To offset this, Wolfram also gave them parts of his land holdings. From the document in question comes knowledge of other localities that even now have the same or similar names, and also of a few people who then lived in Gutenberg. In 1248, a woman named Agnes von Gudenburg cropped up in a document as Wolfram vom Stein the Younger's wife. Wolfram the Younger was the Elder's half-brother, and their father was the Lord Wolfram vom Stein mentioned above. Agnes and Wolfram had stolen some swine from the Breitenfelser Hof, and as compensation they donated 15 Morgen of land to Eberbach Abbey, which at the time owned the Breitenfelser Hof. This document is also noteworthy in that it was the first one to mention the name Gudenburg.

=== Gutenberg under the Lords vom Turm ===
Agnes's and Wolfram's only daughter, Guda, wed Heinrich von Gymnich. It is believed that she sold the castle to a family from Mainz, for in 1301, Mainz treasurer Eberhard's son Philipp, of the house de Turri (rendered "vom Turm" in German, "from the tower") was calling himself Philipp von Gudenburg.

=== Gutenberg under the Lords of Sponheim ===
In 1318, Count Johann of Sponheim was enfeoffed by an Eberhard, Treasurer of Gutenberg and a Johann Buser. He was given leave to defend the castle and the village as if they were his own. In 1334, Eberhard sold Castle Gutenburg and the village of Weithersheim to Johann, with "people, lands, fields and all appurtenances". In 1339, Johann endowed "a perpetual Mass at the church at Weyttersheym for his and his forebears' salvation". This now church, Saint Margaret's (Kirche St. Margarete or Kirche St. Margaretha) no longer exists.

In the same year, the childless Count Johann bequeathed the land to his nephew (his late brother Simon II's son), Walram, Count of Sponheim-Kreuznach. In 1350, the castle and the village of Weithersheim became Walram's wife Elisabeth's widow's estate (Wittum). Her granddaughter, Elisabeth of Sponheim and Vianden, transferred a one-fifth share of Burg Gutenburg and Tal Gutenburg in 1416 to her brother-in-law, Count Palatine of the Rhine Ludwig. Through her marriage to Ruprecht IV Pipan she was Ludwig's sister-in-law, although by this time, her husband was already long dead. In a Burgfrieden ("castle peace") the very same year, Count Johann of Sponheim, the countess's heir, as well as Count Palatine Ludwig, ruled on who had what rights. After the countess's death, they both divided the castles up. In a 1417 document it is laid down who owned what shares in which castles. From this document can be drawn a rough outline of just what the castle looked like in those days. It can be seen today that what remains of the now ruined castle was only a small part of the whole complex. The document speaks of gatehouses, stables, an outer bailey with towers and a well, which can all still vaguely be made out today.

In 1428, Jakob Margrave of Baden and Friedrich Count of Veldenz, both Johann's kin, received the three fourths of the castles that still belonged to Johann. Jakob transferred, for 20,000 Rhenish guilders, one fourth as a pledge to Count Palatine Ludwig. There is an interesting reference in a copy of this document to "Burg und Stadt Gutenberg" ("castle and town of Gutenberg"). Styling Gutenberg a "town" suggested that it had town rights, but this is held to be a simple mistake in the writing. In the same year, a renewed Burgfrieden was concluded between Johann's heirs and the Count Palatine. In 1436, Ludwig died and bequeathed to his eldest son, also named Ludwig, among other things, his share of Gutenberg. He, for his part, acknowledged the Burgfrieden in two documents that he issued in 1437.

The castle at Gutenberg was thus owned by the Counts of Veldenz, the Margraves of Baden and the Counts Palatine of the Rhine, but none wanted to live there. Not even Meinhard von Koppenstein, who according to a document from the same year was Amtmann of Kreuznach, was supposed to govern the castle for the counts. Indeed, only a servant lived there, although there were also five watchmen and attendants, who seem to have lived nearby and did not have to be there at all times. After the Counts of Veldenz died out, their holdings were inherited by the House of Palatinate-Simmern. The castle continued to be owned by the Margraves, the Palatinate-Simmerns and the Counts Palatine until the Rhineland was overrun by French Revolutionary troops in the late 18th century. The respective shares held by each of the counts' successors to the "Further" County of Sponheim, to which the castle at Gutenberg also belonged, were constantly changing. How complex these ownership arrangements were is something that writer W. Dotzauer tries to display graphically in one of his books. The castle thus lost ever more of its importance and fell into disrepair.

=== Castle's ruination ===
How unimportant the castle at Gutenberg had already become by Meinhard von Koppenstein's time can be seen in a 1437 document that lists castles and palaces that were to be supplied with weapons, munitions and provisions. The Gutenburg is not listed at all. In the 1620s, Sebastian Furck came down the Gräfenbach valley towards Kreuznach. He drew the Rosenburg in Argenschwang, the Dalburg and the Gutenburg. These drawings were later published as copper engravings in Daniel Meisner's and Eberhard Kieser's Thesaurus Philopoliticus in 1630. In contrast to the other two castles, which are shown in these pictures in their full stateliness, the Gutenburg is already a ruin. All that can be recognized of it is tower remnants and the fortified walls. Each engraving is accompanied by an inscription, and the one accompanying the Gutenburg reads:

Die Zeit alles aufreiben thut
Ob es wohl schön, auch starck und gut,
Endlich in einem Felsen hart,
Ein Schloß nicht ist vorm fall verwahrt.

or in English:

Time doth destroy all
Whether it may be strong and good,
In the end in a hard rock,
A castle is not spared decay.

This caption, and also the fact that the castle had now not been occupied for more than 500 years make it clear that it was never destroyed (as so many castles were), but rather that it simply succumbed to the ravages of time. Its stones found new use as building materials in the village down below. After the Congress of Vienna, the Rhineland passed to the Kingdom of Prussia, and all castles and palaces accordingly passed to the Prussian state. In 1838, Gutenberg's castle was bought by the Kreuznach court clerk Meyer, who proceeded to build it "in an old-fashioned style into the most attractive point in the dale". The stairway tower got a roof with a flag, and on the western tower, battlements were walled and a wooden house was built in the ward. In the time of Romanticism, there was even dancing at the castle. The holes for the wooden floor beams can still be made out today. The castle has been under private ownership ever since:

- 1880 Heinrich Reidenbach, Bad Kreuznach
- 1919 Julius Schäfer, pharmacist in Bad Münster am Stein
- 1940 Family Puth, Wallhausen

=== Population development ===
Gutenberg's population development since Napoleonic times is shown in the table below. The figures for the years from 1871 to 1987 are drawn from census data:

Year	Inhabitants
1815	302
1835	429
1871	505
1905	457
1939	389

Year	Inhabitants
1950	455
1961	476
1970	606
1987	795
2005	1,015

== Religion ==
As at 30 September 2013, there are 973 full-time residents in Gutenberg, and of those, 387 are Evangelical (39.774%), 431 are Catholic (44.296%), 1 is Lutheran (0.103%), 7 (0.719%) belong to other religious groups and 147 (15.108%) either have no religion or will not reveal their religious affiliation.

== Politics ==
=== Municipal council ===
The council is made up of 16 council members, who were elected by proportional representation at the municipal election held on 7 June 2009, and the honorary mayor as chairman. Each council member belongs to one of two voters' groups; traditional parties won no seats.

=== Mayor ===
Gutenberg's mayor is Jürgen Frank, and his deputies are Christa Dapper, Rosi Stief and Walter Kluge.

=== Coat of arms ===
The municipality's arms might be described thus: Or six lozenges throughout conjoined azure, three and three.

=== Town partnerships ===
Gutenberg fosters partnerships with the following places:

- Villy-le-Bouveret, Haute-Savoie, France

Since 1984, there has been an official partnership between the French commune of Villy-le-Bouveret in the Department of Haute-Savoie, some 30 km south of Geneva, and Gutenberg. Meetings take place every two years with the venue alternating between Gutenberg and Villy. Gutenberg is supported in this endeavour by the club Freundeskreis Villy-le-Bouveret & Gutenberg e.V.

== Culture and sightseeing ==
=== Buildings ===
The following are listed buildings or sites in Rhineland-Palatinate's Directory of Cultural Monuments:

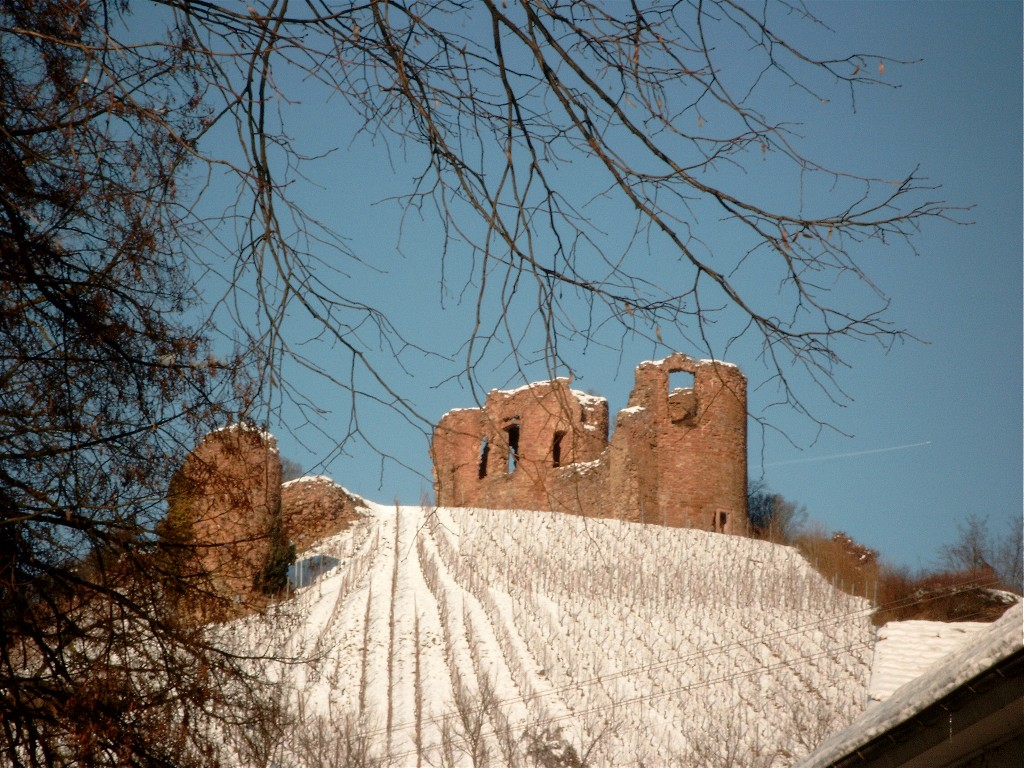
On a hill in the Gräfenbach valley: the ruins of Gutenburg Castle

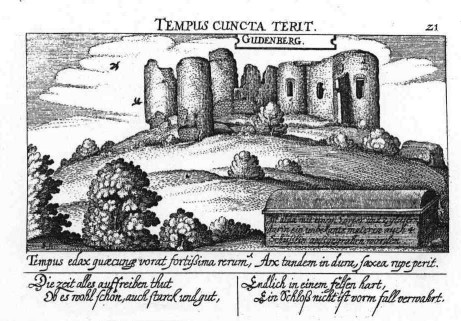
Gutenberg in a copper engraving according to Sebastian Furck/Daniel Meisner (before 1630)

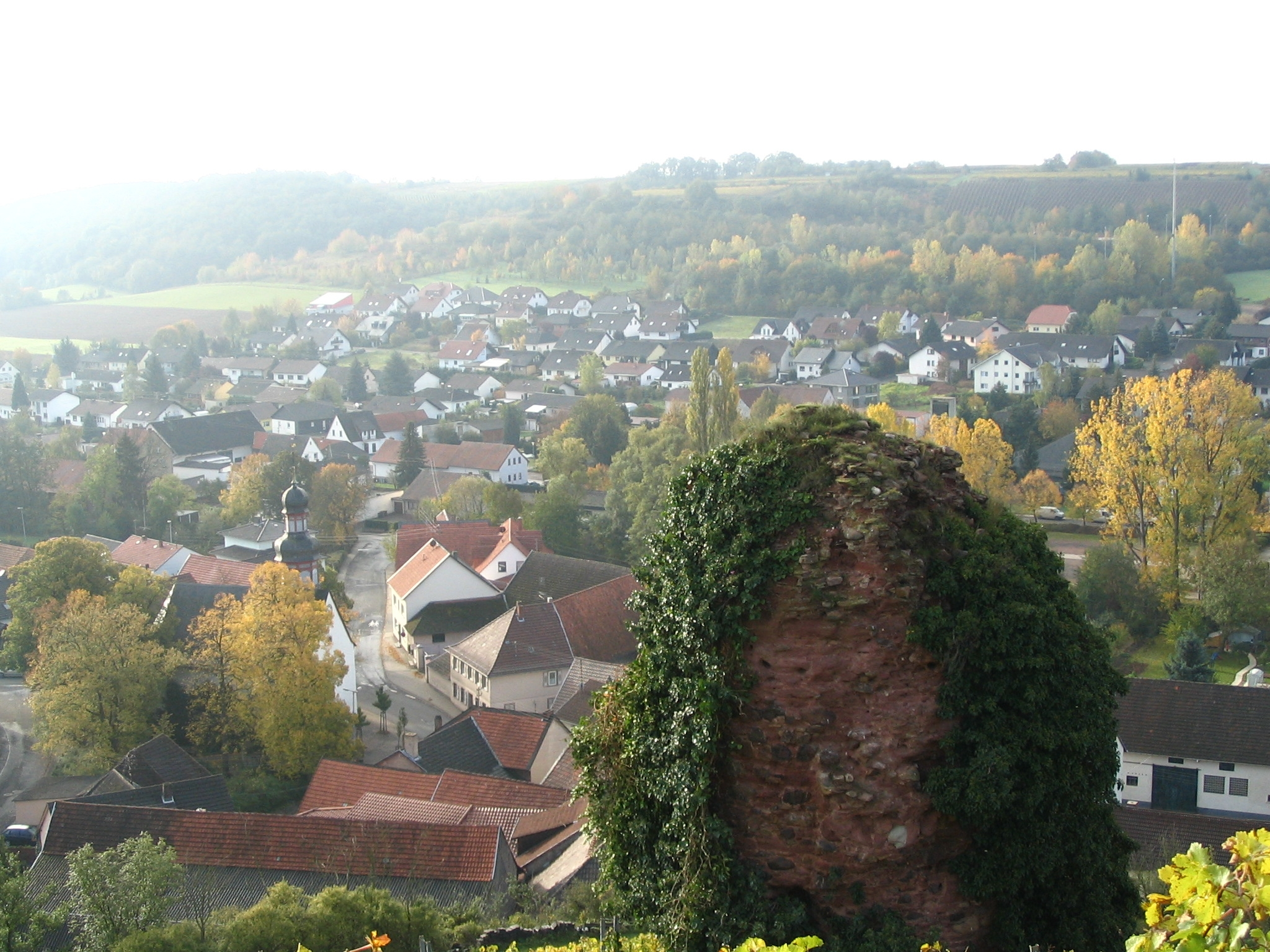
Gutenberg in the Gräfenbach valley

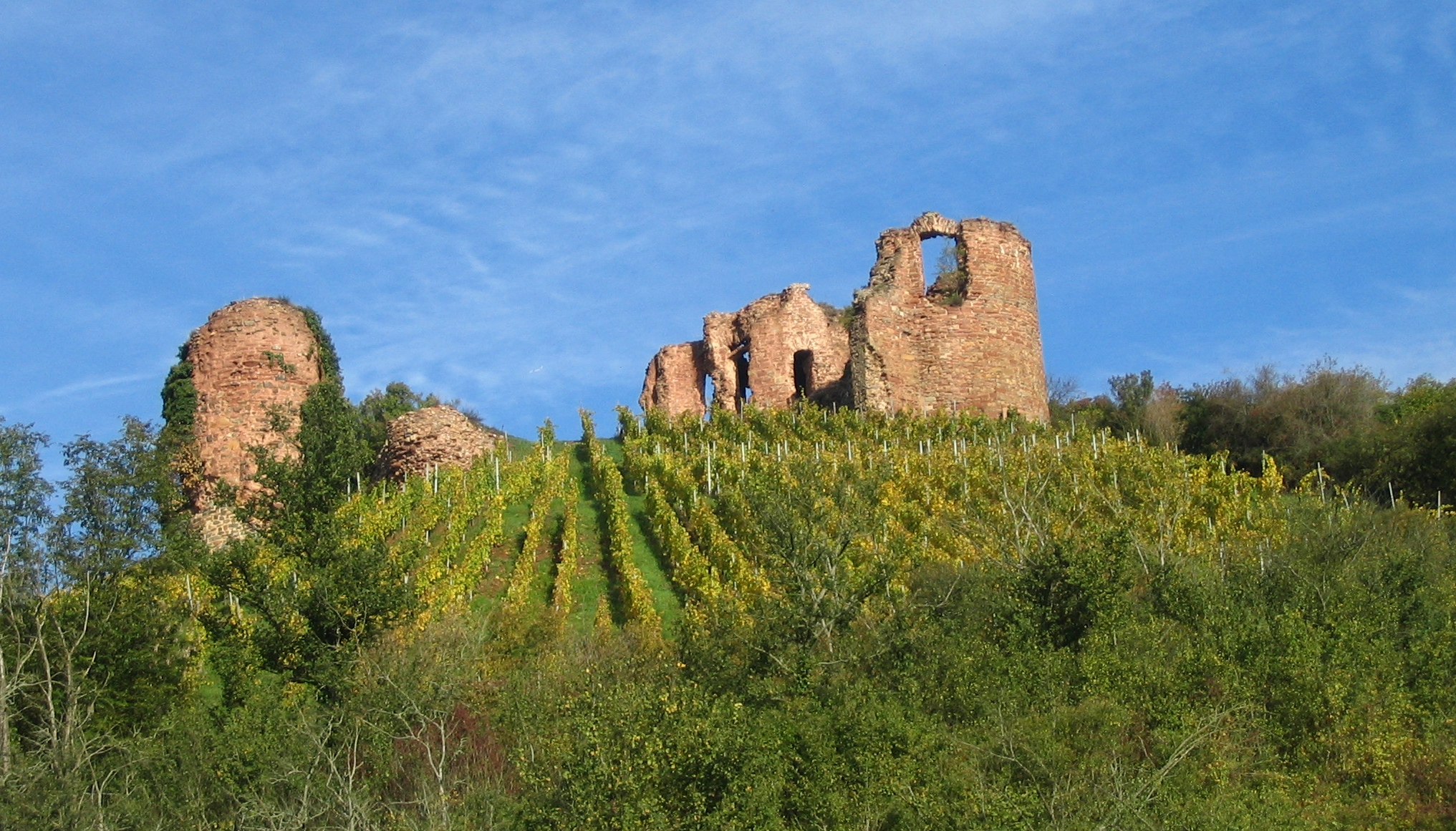
Gutenburg Castle ruins

- Evangelical church, Hauptstraße – former simultaneous church, Late Baroque aisleless church, marked 1769
- Hauptstraße 13 – house, Classicist building with hip roof, timber framing plastered, earlier half of the 19th century
- Hauptstraße 28 – former school; Late Classicist building with hip roof, about 1870/1880
- Hauptstraße 32 – timber-frame house, partly solid, possibly from the 18th or early 19th century
- Castle Gutenburg ruin (monumental zone), on a hill in the Gräfenbach valley – rectangular complex with corner towers; parts of the outer wall, round tower above the outer wards of the caste, which was built in 1213 and destroyed in the 17th century

=== Regular events ===
Gutenberg holds a tent kermis (church consecration festival) each year on the second weekend in September.

=== Clubs ===
Gutenberg has a great number of clubs. Currently active in the municipality are the following:

- Burgtheater Gutenberg — theatre club
- Cantarinis — ecumenical children's choirs
- Christlicher Verein junger Menschen (CVJM) — YMCA
- "Chörchen" — Evangelical church choir
- CDU-Ortsverein — Christian Democratic Union of Germany local chapter
- Freundeskreis (Villy-le-Bouveret & Gutenberg e.V.) — "circle of friends" concerning itself with Gutenberg's partnership with Villy-le-Bouveret
- Freunde helfen Freunden — help for children from Chernobyl
- Förderverein der Feuerwehr — fire brigade promotional association
- Förderverein Kindergarten — kindergarten promotional association
- Freie Wählergruppe Süss — Free Voters' group
- Gesangverein — singing club
- Nachbarschaftshilfe im Trauerfall — "neighbourly help for those in mourning"
- NOBetterWay e.V. — charity
- SPD-Ortsverein — Social Democratic Party of Germany local chapter
- Turnverein Gutenberg — gymnastic club
  - Abteilung Linedance — line dancing department
- TuS Gutenberg — gymnastic and sport club
  - Abteilung Fußball — football department
  - Abteilung Tennis — tennis department
  - Abteilung Tischtennis — table tennis department
  - Abteilung Turnen & Tanzen — gymnastic and dancing department
- Wählergruppe Frank — Free Voters' group
- VdK — social advocacy group
- Weizenbierclub — "wheat beer club"
- Zunft — literally "guild", a corps of volunteer pallbearers

== Economy and infrastructure ==
=== Transport ===
Gutenberg is served by Omnibusverkehr Rhein-Nahe GmbH bus route no. 244 (Bad Kreuznach–Wallhausen–Münchwald). Gutenberg lies within the Rhein-Nahe-Nahverkehrsverbund, a local public transport association whose fares therefore apply. The local bus route serves Bad Kreuznach station, making the rail service there available to those living in Gutenberg. Running through the village is Landesstraße 239. To the south runs Bundesstraße 41, which leads to Bad Kreuznach, linking there with other Bundesstraßen (48 and 428). To the north lies the Autobahn A 61 (Koblenz–Ludwigshafen), the nearest interchange on which is in Waldlaubersheim.
