= John I of Sponheim-Starkenburg =

John I, Count of Sponheim-Starkenburg (before 1206 - 1266) was a German count. He was son of Gottfried III of Sponheim and Adelheid of Sayn, and ruled from 1218 to his death. He married a daughter of Frederick of Isenberg, among their children are Henry I, who inherited Sponheim-Starkenburg, and Gottfried I, who inherited Sayn.

== Life ==
John I of Sponheim-Starkenburg was born to Gottfried III of Sponheim and Adelheid of Sayn sometime before 1206.

Sometime between 1223 and 1237, after the death of his father, he divided his inheritance between himself and his brothers Henry I of Heinsberg and Simon I of Sponheim. Simon received two-thirds of the County of Sponheim and founded the Sponheim-Kreuznach line, while John himself received the remaining third. The inheritance took effect in 1247 after the death of their uncle, Count Heinrich III of Sayn.

He lived at Starkenburg Castle and was married twice, with the first marriage being childless.

| Preceded by Gottfried III | Count of Sponheim; 1218-1266 | Succeeded by Henry I |
| Preceded by Adelheid | Count of Sayn; 1263-1266 | Succeeded by Gottfried I |
