= Project Gutenberg (disambiguation) =

Project Gutenberg is a volunteer effort to digitize and archive cultural works under U.S. copyright law.

Project Gutenberg or Gutenberg project may also refer to:

== Books ==
- Project Gutenberg Australia, a Project Gutenberg sister project under Australian copyright law
- Project Gutenberg Canada, a Project Gutenberg sister project under Canadian copyright law
- Faded Page, the book archive of Distributed Proofreaders Canada of which some are included at Project Gutenberg Canada

== Other ==
- Project Gutenberg Encyclopedia or Encyclopædia Britannica Eleventh Edition (1910–1911)
- Project Gutenberg (film), (aka Mo Seung; 無雙) a 2018 Hong Kong crime thriller film

== See also ==
- Gutenberg press, the circa 1440 European printing press with lead alloy movable type from individually cast, reusable letters
- Gutenberg (disambiguation)
- Gutenburg (disambiguation)
- Guttenberg (disambiguation)
