= Gutenberg (surname) =

Gutenberg is a German surname. Notable people with the surname include:

- Beno Gutenberg (1889–1960), German-born seismologist
- Erich Gutenberg (1897–1984), German economist
- Johannes Gutenberg (c. 1398–1468), German printer and publisher

== See also ==
- Guttenberg (disambiguation)
- Gutenburg (disambiguation)
