= John II of Sponheim-Kreuznach =

John II, Count of Sponheim-Kreuznach
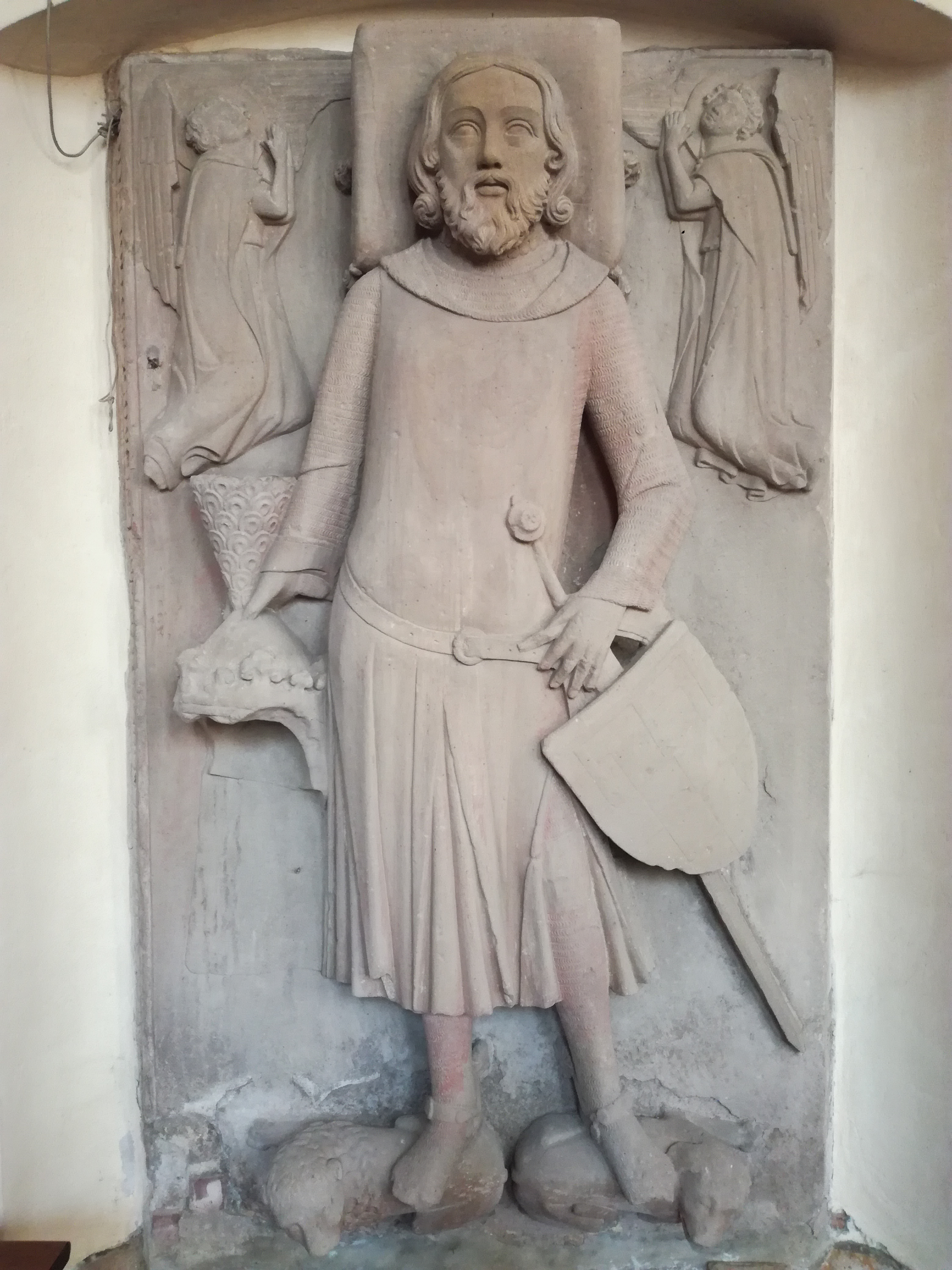
- Born: c. 1270-1275
- Died: 11 March 1340; Pfaffen-Schwabenheim
- Buried: Augustinian Canonical Foundation
- Noble family: House of Sponheim
- Spouse: None
- Father: John I, Count of Sponheim-Kreuznach
- Mother: Adelaide of Leiningen-Landeck

John II "The Lame" (German: Johann II der Lahme) (born 1270-75; died 11 March 1340) was a German nobleman of the house of Sponheim, ruling over the County of Sponheim. He succeeded his elder brother Simon II.

John was the son of John I, Count of Sponheim-Kreuznach. He first was recorded in 1290 with his brother Simon as the ruling count in Sponheim. By 1300, the county was divided in rule between the two brothers. The northern part was ruled by Simon in Kastellaun, and John retained the south part with Bad Kreuznach. In 1920, he received the lordship of Ebernburg as part of inheritance from his Leiningen-Landeck lineage, which died out with his mother, Adelheid von Leiningen-Landeck.

With his brother, John supported Frederick the Handsome during the period of dual kingship until 1322. In 1328, the support of the Sponheimers for the Wildgraves in the first Schmidtburg feud led to armed conflicts with Baldwin of Luxembourg. Ludwig IV supported Bavaria as early as 1330, and John received from him the town charter for Winterburg and Koppenstein. Unlike his brother Simon, John pursued active castle policy. He reestablished Koppenstein Castle, built in Winterburg, and bought Grafendahn Castle and Gutenburg Castle. John died on March 11, 1340, having passed down his inheritance to his nephew Walram, who united the north and south parts of the county. John's grave is in the monasterial church in Pfaffen-Schwabenheim.

Although once engaged to a daughter of Friedrich von Kyrburg, John was never married, and had an illegitimate son named Walrab with a woman from the Stelin von Bonnheim family of knights, who were ministerialises in the Sponheim county. Walrab founded the non-count line of Koppensteiner.^{[de]}

== Progeny ==
- Wallrab von Koppenstein, illegitimate son and founder of the Koppenstein line
- Henne von Cruzenach (died after 1379), illegitimate son and burgrave of Vianden
