= Simon II of Sponheim-Kreuznach =

Simon II, Count of Sponheim-Kreuznach
- Born: c. 1270
- Died: 1336; Kastellaun
- Buried: City church in Kastellaun
- Noble family: House of Sponheim
- Spouse: Elisabeth II of Valkenburg
- Father: John I, Count of Sponheim-Kreuznach
- Mother: Adelaide of Leiningen-Landeck

Simon II of Sponheim (c. 1270 – 1336 in Kastellaun) was a nobleman from the Holy Roman Empire. He was a member of the House of Sponheim and a ruling Count of the County of Sponheim.

== Life ==
Simon II was born around the year 1270 as a son of Count John I, Count of Sponheim-Kreuznach and his wife Adelaide of Leiningen-Landeck. After his father died in 1290, Simon II ruled the county jointly with his brother John II, Count of Sponheim-Kreuznach.

He married Elisabeth II of Valkenburg in 1300. Around this time, the brothers divided the county. The dividing line was Soonwald Forest; Simon II ruled the part north of the forest, including Kirchberg and Kastellaun. Simon chose Kastellaun Castle as his residence. He expanded the castle and the town, giving it city rights in 1305 and market rights in 1309. Later, he built city walls and a new church, which today serves as the evangelical (i.e. Protestant) church.

In Kreuznach he built the Alte Nahebrücke (Old Nahe Bridge) in about 1300. The first recorded mention of the stone bridge was in 1332. It not only provided an important link on the road between Mainz and Trier, but also formed part of the Kreuznach's town fortifications. It still stands today and is one of oldest stone bridges in Germany.

Simon II's younger brother Emerich made two failed attempts to be elected Archbishop. Both attempts were blocked by the powerful Luxembourg family. After this blockade, Simon II and his brothers opposed Archbishop Baldwin of Archbishopric of Trier and supported his opponent, anti-king Frederick the Fair, the opponent of Emperor Louis IV. Their opposition to the Luxembourg dynasty formed the basis of their policies, and led to numerous feuds.

In 1320, Baldwin captured the Sponheim city of Sprendlingen and besieged Kreuznach and Kastellaun. A year later, Simon II gave up and signed a peace treaty with Baldwin. In 1325, Baldwin constructed Balduinseck Castle, to weaken the position of Kastellaun Castle. Three years later, Simon II supported the wildgraves of Nahegau, who fought Archbishop Baldwin over Schmidtburg Castle.

Simon II died in 1336 and was buried in the church he had built in Kastellaun. A double grave monument for Simon II and his wife can still be found in the church. His heir was his son Walram.

== Marriage and issue ==
He married Elisabeth II of Valkenburg in 1300. Together, they had the following children:

- Walram (d. 1380), Count of Sponheim, married on 9 August 1330 to Elisabeth of Katzenelnbogen (d. 1383)
- Simon
- John II (1312-1348), Count of Sponheim
- Reinhard (d. 1352), canon in Mainz and Trier
- Imagina (d. after 21 December 1352), married in 1322 to Count Philip of Solms (d. 1364 or 1365)
- Margaret, married in 1330 to a Wildgrave of Dhaun and Grumbach (d. 1350)
- Anna (d. 1330), married Count John I of Katzenelnbogen (d. 1357)
- Elisabeth, married:
  1. before 1331 to Count Rudolph I of Hohenberg (d. 1336)
  2. before 15 October 1340 to Louis the Junker of Hesse (d. 1345)

== Bibliography ==
- Johannes Mötsch: Die Burg Kastellaun bis 1437, in: Stadt Kastellaun (eds.): Das Wahrzeichen Kastellauns — Seine Burg, in the series Kastellaun in der Geschichte, vol. 3, Kastellaun, 1994, p. 19-58
- Johannes Mötsch: Trier und Sponheim, in: Johannes Mötsch and Franz-Josef Heyen (eds.): Balduin von Luxemburg. Erzbischof von Trier — Kurfürst des Reiches. Festschrift aus Anlaß des 700. Geburtsjahres, Mainz, 1985, p. 357 - 389

Simon II of Sponheim-Kreuznach House of Sponheim Born: c. 1270 Died: 1336
Preceded by John I	Count of Sponheim-Kreuznach; 1290-1336	Succeeded by Walram
