= Villy-le-Bouveret =

Villy-le-Bouveret Viyi (Savoyard)
- Commune
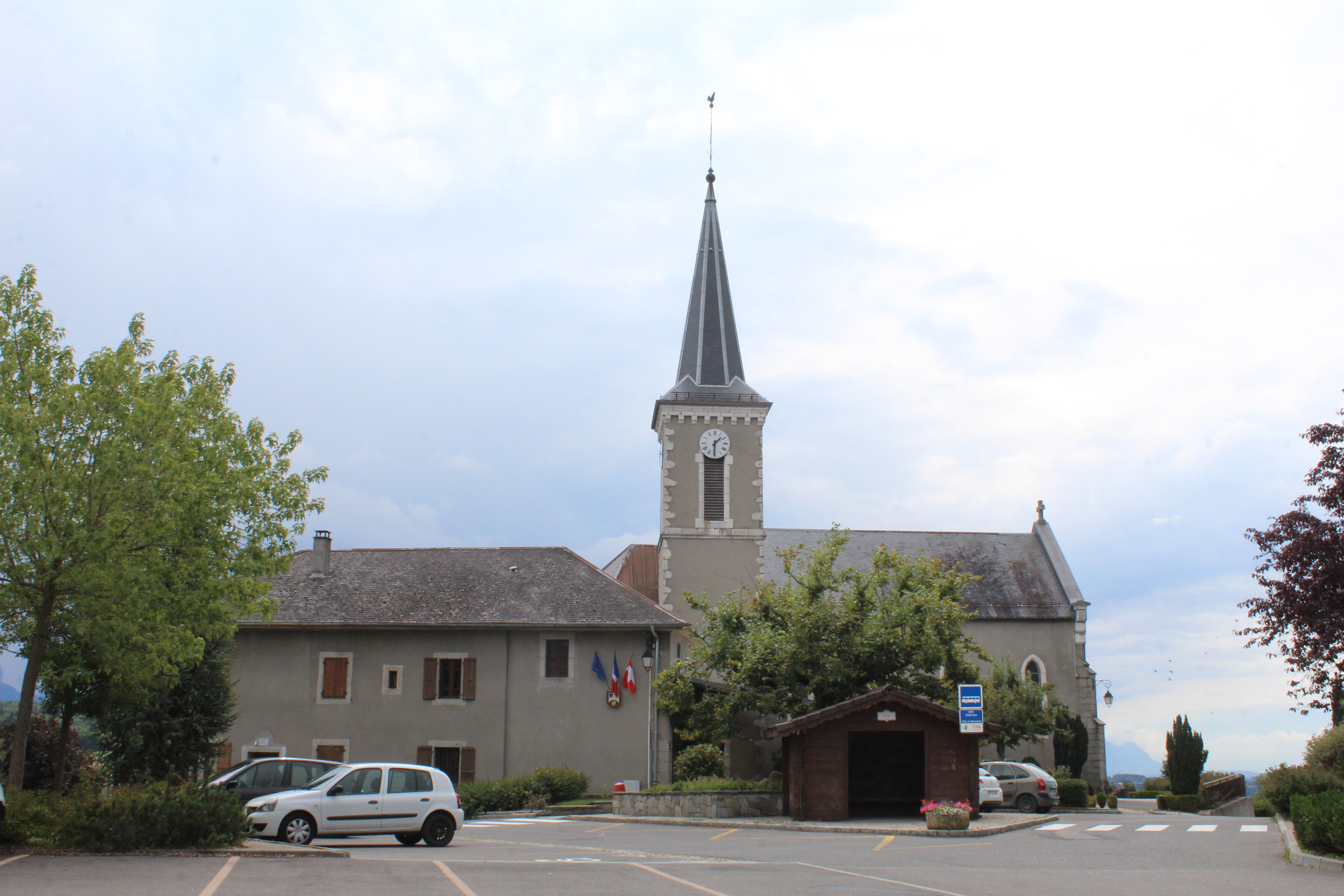
- Town hall and Saint-Pierre church
- Location of Villy-le-Bouveret
- Location within France Location within Auvergne-Rhône-Alpes
- Coordinates: 46°02′41″N 6°09′46″E
- Country: France
- Region: Auvergne-Rhône-Alpes
- Department: Haute-Savoie
- Arrondissement: Saint-Julien-en-Genevois
- Canton: La Roche-sur-Foron
- Intercommunality: CC Pays de Cruseilles

Government
  - Mayor (2020–2026): Jean-Marc Bouchet
- Area^{1}: 3.49 km^{2} (1.35 sq mi)
- Elevation: 772 m (2,533 ft)
- Highest elevation: 802 m (2,631 ft)
- Lowest elevation: 626 m (2,054 ft)
- Population (2023): 653
  - Density: 187/km^{2} (485/sq mi)
- Time zone: UTC+01:00 (CET)
  - Summer (DST): UTC+02:00 (CEST)
- INSEE/Postal code: 74306 /74350
- ^{1} French Land Register data, which excludes lakes, ponds, glaciers > 1 km^{2} (0.386 sq mi or 247 acres) and river estuaries.

Villy-le-Bouveret (Savoyard: Viyi) is a commune in the Haute-Savoie department in the Auvergne-Rhône-Alpes region in south-eastern France.

== Town partnerships ==
Since 1984, Villy-le-Bouveret fosters an official partnership with Gutenberg, in the Bad Kreuznach district, Rhineland-Palatinate, Germany. Meetings take place every two years with the venue alternating between Gutenberg and Villy.

== See also ==
- Communes of the Haute-Savoie department
