= Siege of Kreuznach =

1620 battle of the Thirty Years' War

Siege of Bad Kreuznach
- Part of the Palatinate phase of the Thirty Years' War
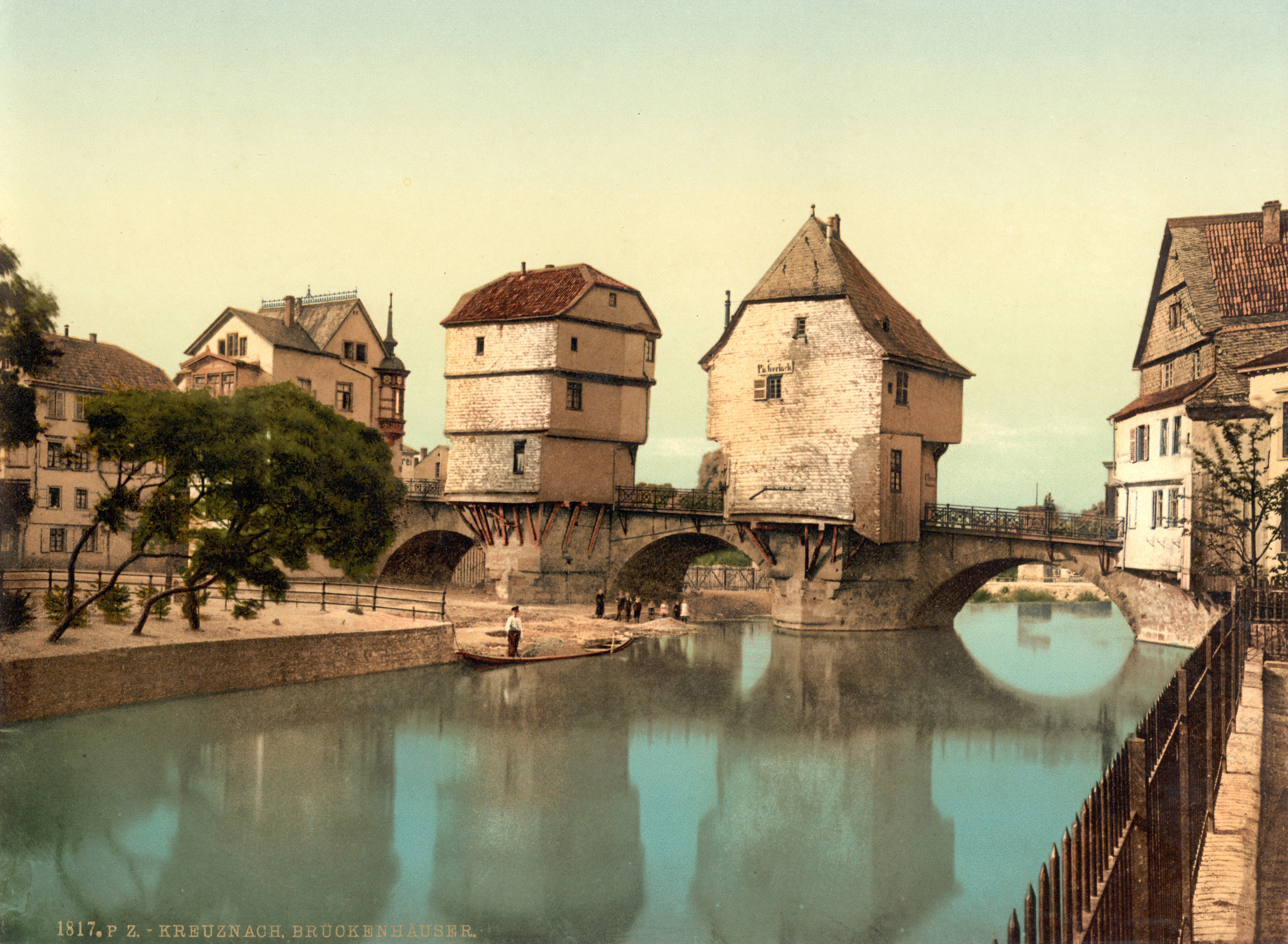
- Old Nahe Bridge, Bad Kreuznach
Date	10 September 1620
Location	Bad Kreuznach, Palatinate (present-day Germany) 49°51′N 7°52′E
Result	Spanish victory

Belligerents
(Spain) Spanish Empire	Palatinate

Commanders and leaders
(Spain) Carlos Coloma	Unknown (surrendered)

Strength
5,000 infantry 300 cavalry 4 cannons	~3 infantry companies ~1 company of cavalry

Casualties and losses
None	None

The siege of Kreuznach or the Spanish capture of Kreuznach took place on 10 September 1620, at Kreuznach (renamed Bad Kreuznach in 1924) in the Palatinate, where the Army of Flanders, led by the Spanish Don Ambrosio Spinola, defeated the troops of Frederick V, Elector of the Palatinate, during the Palatinate campaign of the Thirty Years' War. The Army of Flanders was a multinational army in the service of the kings of Spain that was based in the Netherlands during the 16th to 18th centuries. Spinola's troops stormed Bad Kreuznach and its garrison surrendered. Later the town was freed on an oath not to rebel against the Holy Roman Empire.

== Background ==
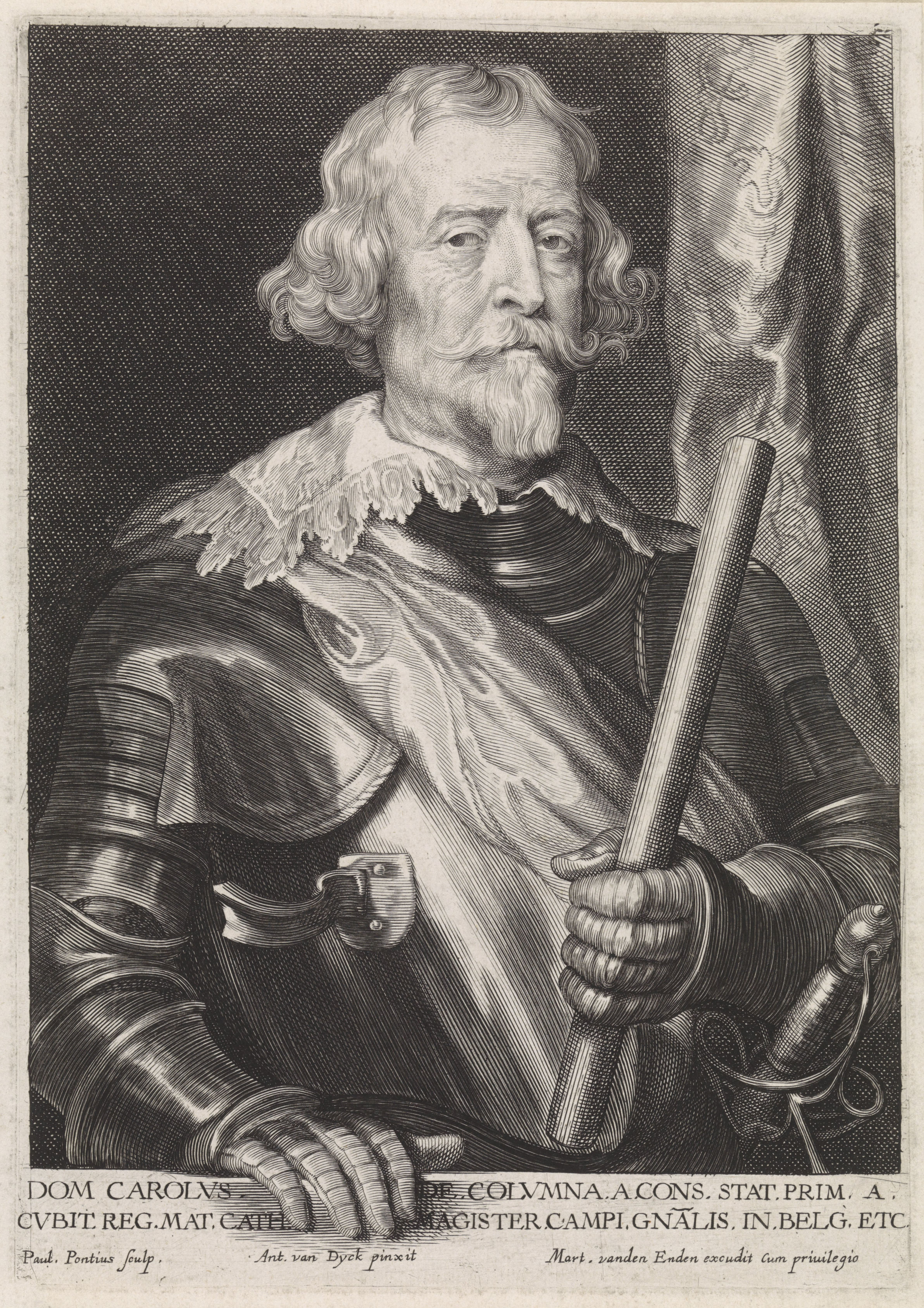
Don Carlos Coloma

The Thirty Years' War began in 1618 with the Bohemian Revolt, when the authorities of Bohemia offered the throne of their kingdom to the Protestant Frederick V of the Palatinate. He accepted and this initiated a conflict between the Protestant Union led by Frederick and the Catholic House of Habsburg. Two years after the outbreak of the war the situation had apparently reached a standstill, but in reality the Habsburgs were able to politically isolate Frederick via diplomatic manoeuvres.

In August 1620, Spinola and 25,000 soldiers from the Army of Flanders began their march from Brussels, and in early September they entered the Lower Palatinate, taking Bad Kreuznach, Oppenheim, and the Bergstrasse district, and on 1 October Bacharach.

Since the Elector of Palatine had not yet begun hostilities against the Spanish monarchy, Spinola tried to occupy the main towns of the Palantine as peaceably as possible. On 8 September Spinola marched with his army against the Palatine forces not far from Oppenheim. At midnight he ordered his Field Marshal Don Carlos II Coloma, in command of two Tercios of infantry, numbering about 5,000 soldiers and 300 horsemen, to take the town of Kreuznach, a town of some importance because it had a fortified bridge over the Nahe river and Kauzenburg Castle, which overlooked the town.

== Siege ==
Don Carlos Coloma arrived with his troops at the gates of the town on the evening of 10 September, and sent emissaries to the authorities saying that if they surrendered to the obedience of Emperor Ferdinand II they would be well treated. Faced with an ambiguous response from the defenders, Coloma ordered the placement of four cannons and moved his troops to the foot of the walls and the gate of the town to launch the assault.

The defenders of Kreuznach, whose forces consisted of three companies of infantry and one of cavalry, decided to act and fired their muskets from the castle overlooking the town. Then, the Flanders forces, in perfect formation, responded by opening fire with their cannons. A few minutes later, the garrison decided to surrender the town. The Army of Flanders captured the horses and the weapons of the Palatine soldiers, and Coloma forced the Palatine troops to take an oath not to continue fighting against the Emperor.

== Aftermath ==
With the news of the fall of Kreuznach, Spinola continued the march with his army over the Palatinate to Alzey, one of the main cities of the region, and captured it in the same day. Four days after, on 14 September, Spinola, with a great maneuver of distraction over Worms, captured Oppenheim, without too much difficulty, causing a severe blow to the Protestant forces.
