= Alte Nahebrücke (Bad Kreuznach) =

Medieval bridge with buildings

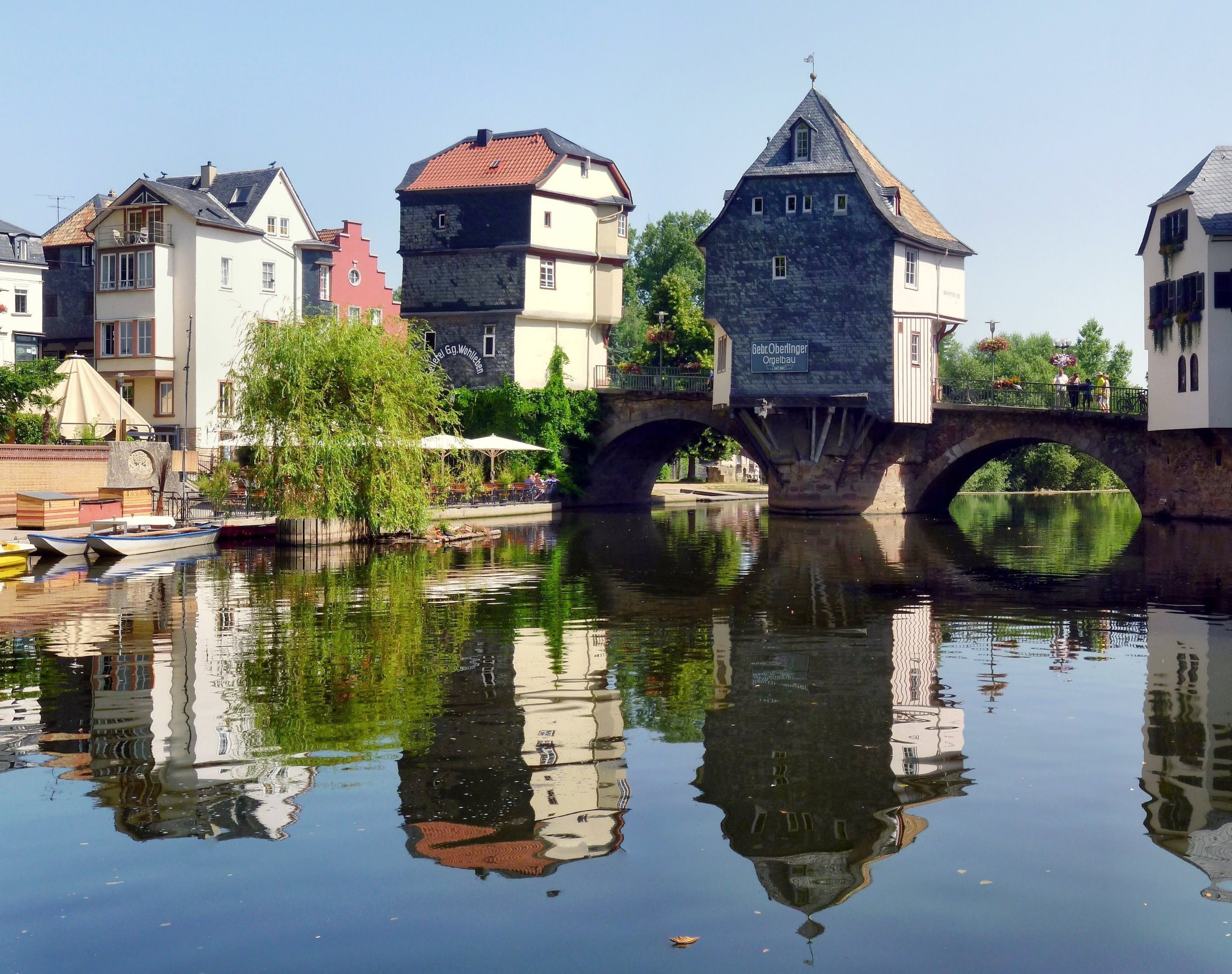
- Coordinates: 49°50′41″N 07°51′28″E
- Crosses: Nahe river
- Locale: Bad Kreuznach, Rhineland-Palatinate

Characteristics
- Design: stone arch bridge
- Total length: 135 metres (443 ft)
- Width: 10 metres (33 ft)

History
- Construction end: c. 1300/1956 (bridge); 1612 (houses)

Location
- Interactive map of Alte Nahebrücke

The Alte Nahebrücke (English: Old Nahe Bridge) is a medieval stone arch bridge in Bad Kreuznach, in western Germany, dating from around 1300, that originally spanned the Nahe river and a neighbouring canal called the Mühlenteich (English: mill pond). Only the section spanning the canal remains intact. With four houses on its piers, it is one of the few remaining bridges in the world that has buildings on it.

== History ==
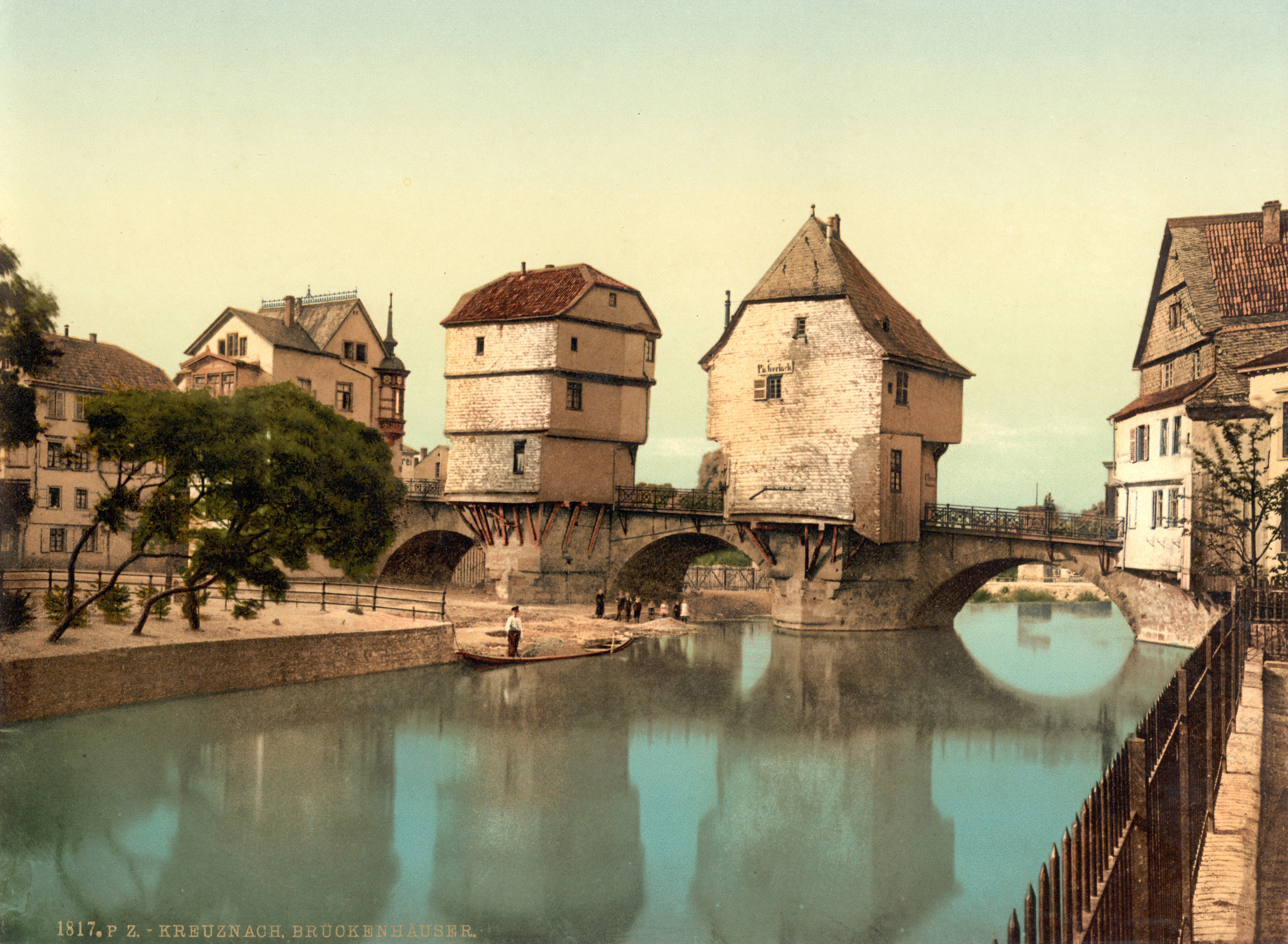
Alte Nahebrücke, c. 1900

The stone Alte Nahebrücke was built around 1300 by Simon II, Count of Sponheim-Kreuznach, who ruled the town, to replace a wooden bridge which connected settlements on either side of the Nahe river. It provided an important connection on the road from to Mainz to Trier, and it formed part of the town fortifications. Towers on the bridge, one of which was for a period used as a prison, were destroyed by French troops in the late 17th century. The first recorded mention of the stone bridge was in 1332, when the Pauluskirche (English: St Paul's Church), which stands on Wörthinsel, the island between the canal and the river, was consecrated. Karl Marx was married in the church on 19 June 1843.

The bridge has two arms; one spanning the Nahe river and another, which supports the old buildings, spanning the Mühlenteich (English: mill pond) canal, which is parallel to the river. On Friday, 16 March 1945 the arm of the bridge spanning the river was blown up by German troops to hinder the approach of American forces. This destroyed a Baroque style Christian stone cross (a 1934 reproduction of the original) which was on the sixth pier of the bridge, and a statue of Saint John of Nepomuk, the bridge's patron saint, which was on the seventh pier.

American tanks arrived in Bad Kreuznach at midday 18 March 1945, unimpeded by the damage to the bridge.

In 1955, the town council had the remaining original span of the bridge over the Mühlenteich widened by two metres. In 1956, a concrete single-span bridge was built to replace the destroyed section which crossed the Nahe river. There was controversy about this work as some people felt that the 700 year-old historic bridge should have been returned to its original form.

From 2015 to 2017 both the old span and the 1956 concrete span of the bridge underwent a major restoration. The 1956 span had become structurally weakened and it was originally planned to replace it with a completely new bridge. However, due to financial constraints the local authority decided to restore it and to put a new support pier under it.

=== Houses ===
Houses were first built on the bridge around 1480 and first mentioned in 1495. The half-timbered buildings that remain on the span crossing the Mühlenteich were built between 1582 and 1612. The four buildings, on the street now called Mannheimer Straße, are on four bridge piers on the upstream side of the bridge. There is also a house on the downstream side of the fourth pier, but its foundations are on an island which lies between the canal and the river, so it is not actually a bridge-supported building.

- 96 Mannheimer Straße – Built in 1612, restored 1985.
- 94 Mannheimer Straße – Built in 1609. The house has a cannonball embedded in its front facade between the upper floor windows. It was shot by Swedish troops in a military engagement in 1632, during the Thirty Years War.
- 92 Mannheimer Straße – Built 1595. The building is notable for its protruding back facade, and protruding upper floors.
- 90 Mannheimer Straße – Built 1582. A basement was later built underneath its original groundfloor.

Craftsmen and merchants originally lived in the buildings, which are now used as shops and business premises.

== Bridge structure ==
Originally the bridge had eight arches in total and it was built of sandstone and porphyry rock. Since being widened in 1955, the road carriageway has had a width of 6 m and the footpaths on each side have widths of between 2 m and 3 m. The narrowest point between the two houses on the fourth pier is 4 m wide.

The bridge is 135 m long in total, with the 1956 concrete span being 49.4 m long. The three arched vaults supporting the old span of the bridge are 10.5 m to 12.55 m wide.

== Gallery ==
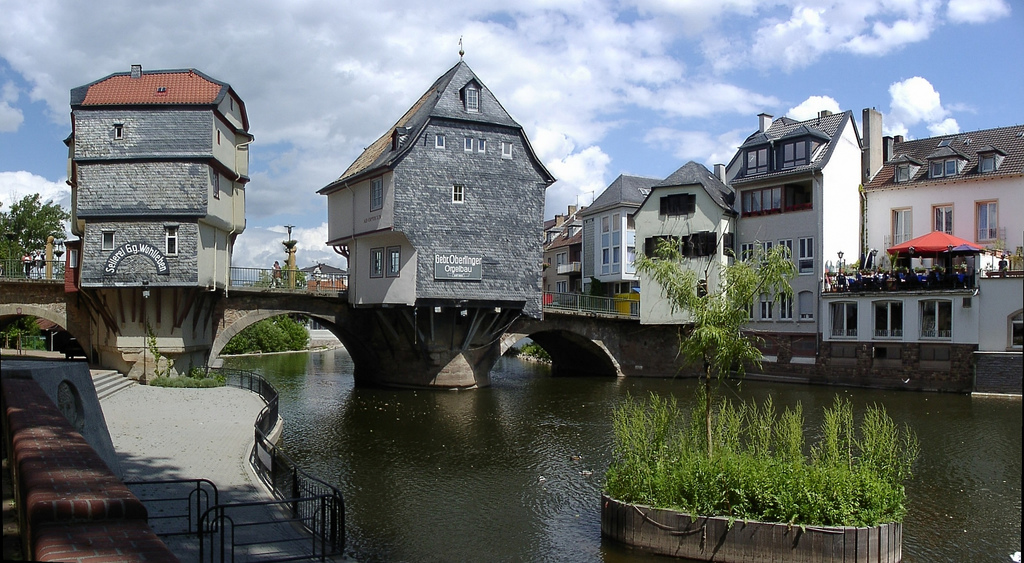
Alte Nahebrücke, upstream view, 2004

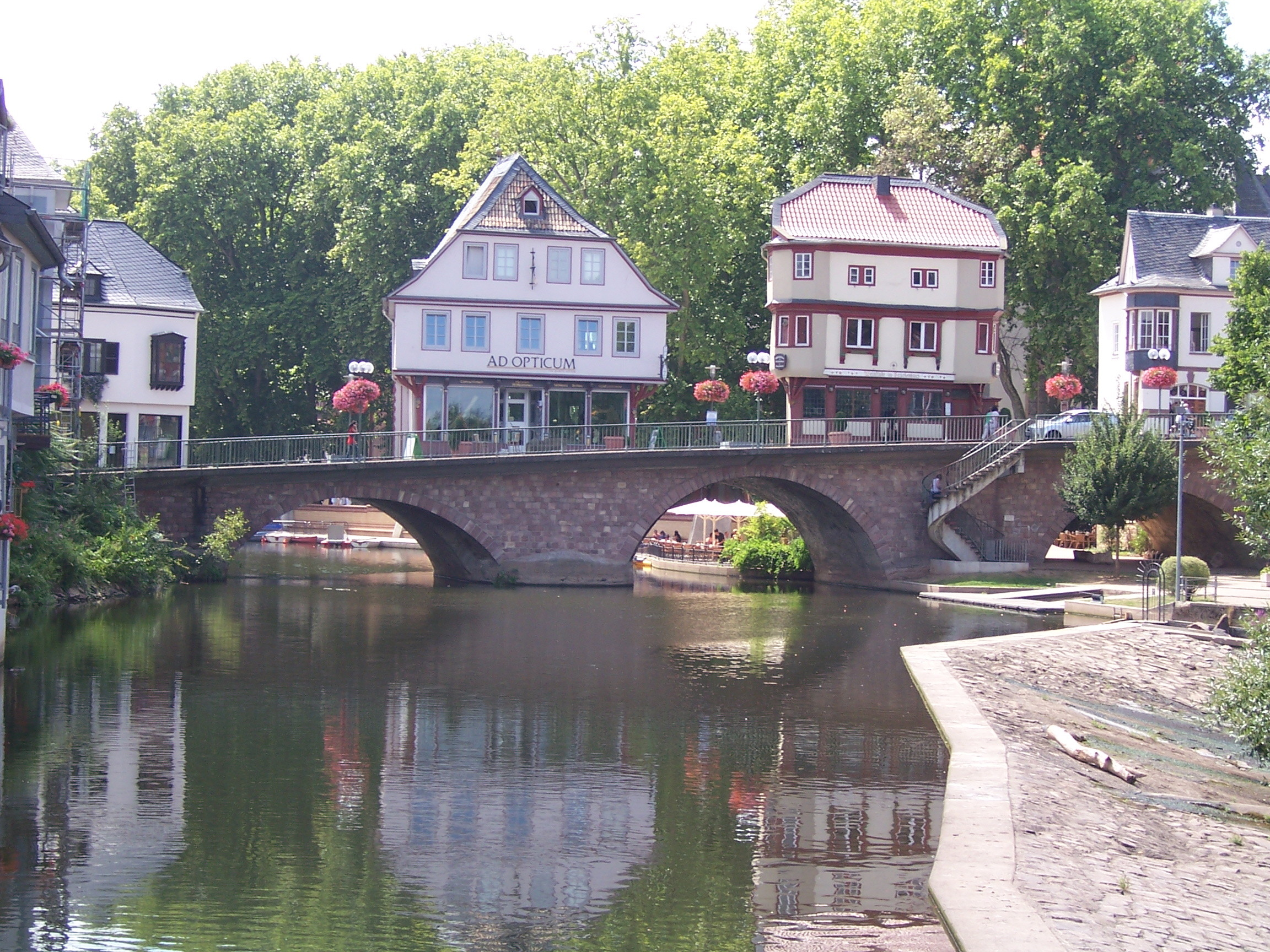
Alte Nahebrücke downstream view, east side, 2008

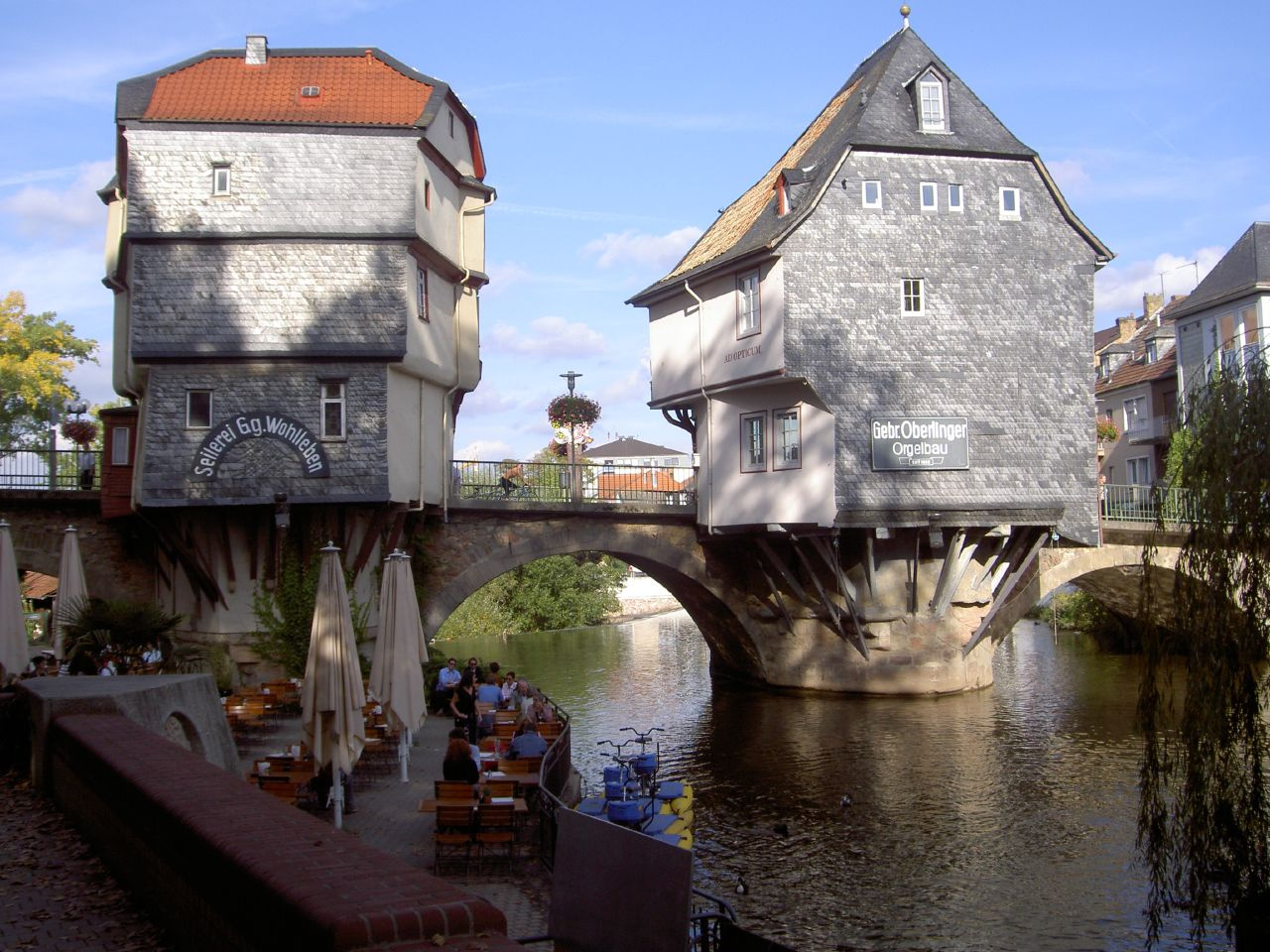
Alte Nahebrücke, tiled buildings, 2007

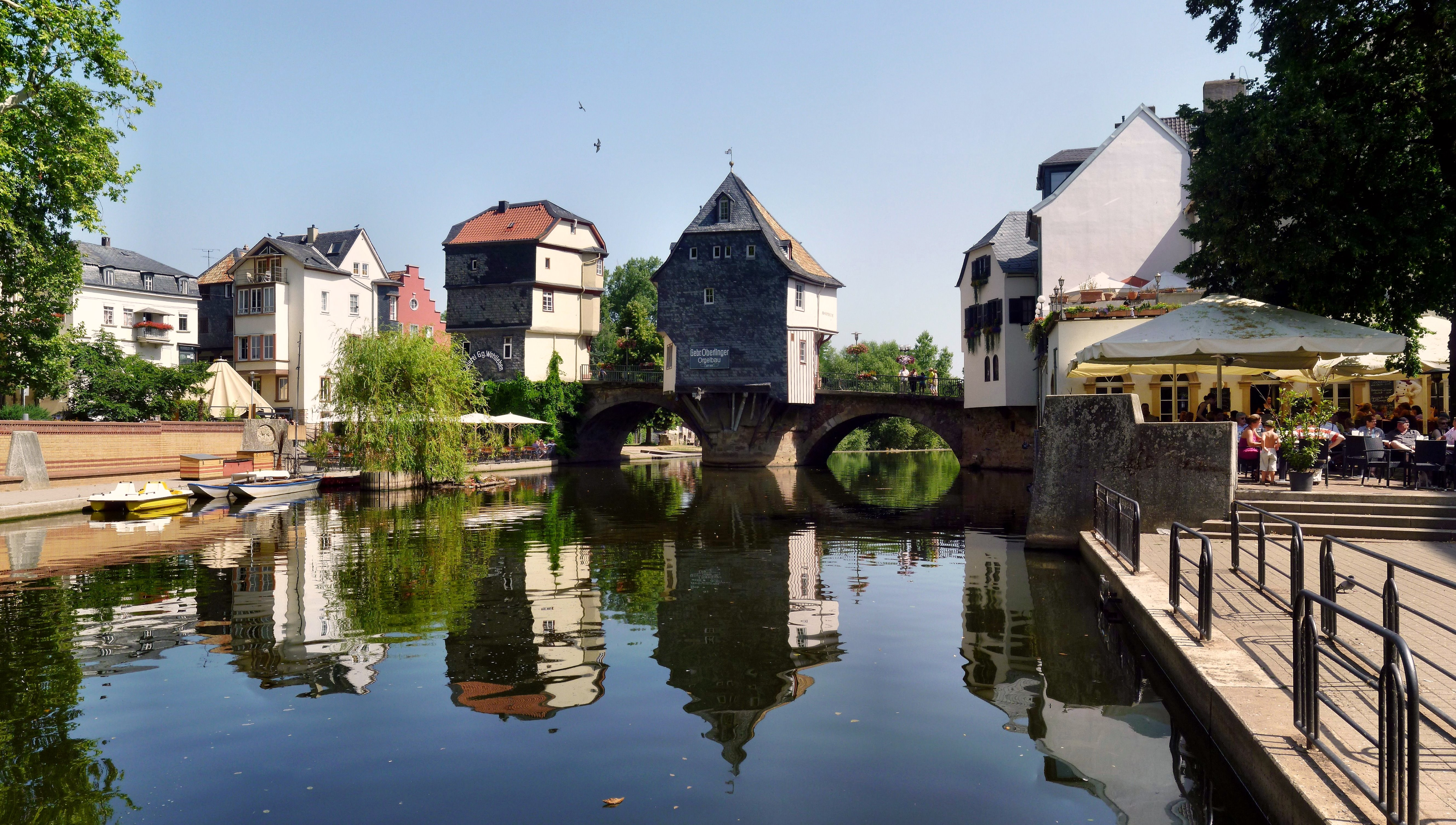
Alte Nahebrücke and Mühlenteich canal, 2010

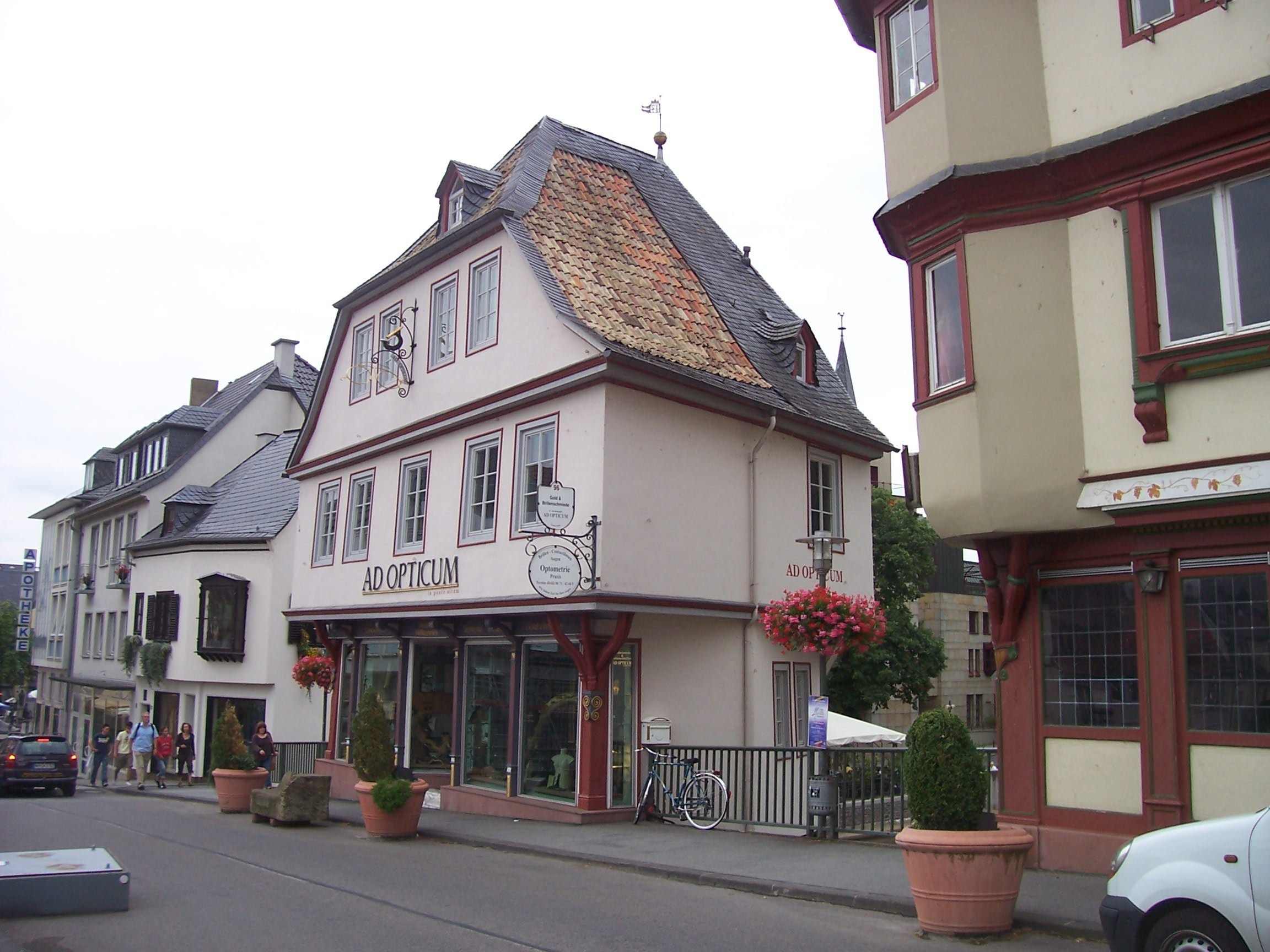
Bridge houses from the street, 2008

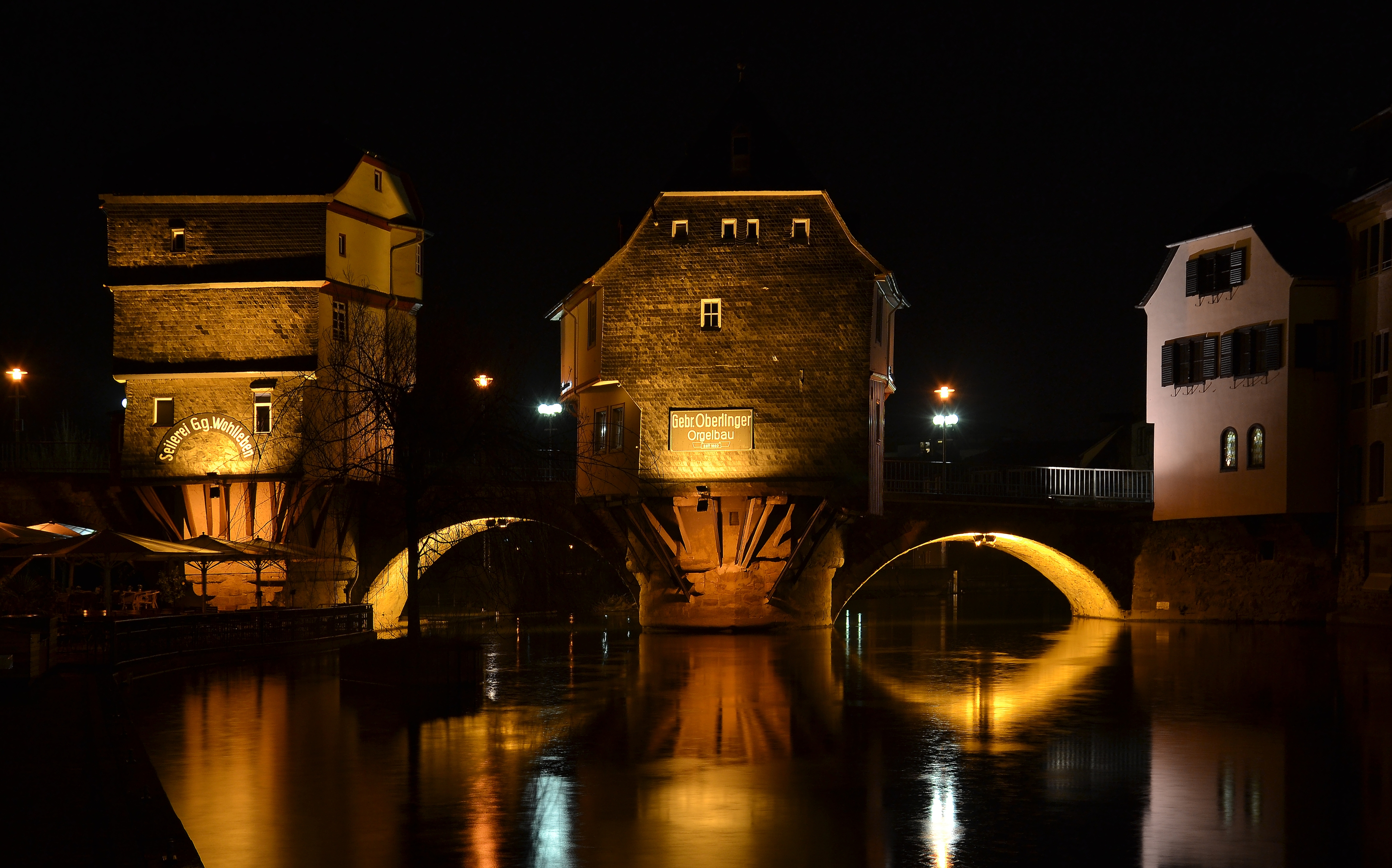
Alte Nahebrücke at night

== See also ==
- Siege of Bad Kreuznach
- Krämerbrücke
- High Bridge, Lincoln
- Pont des Marchands
- List of medieval stone bridges in Germany
- List of bridges in Germany

== Bibliography ==
- Vogt, Werner (1988) Nahebrücke Bad Kreuznach. In: Steinbrücken in Deutschland. Düsseldorf: Beton-Verlag, ISBN 3-7640-0240-9, pp. 394–398
- Schaller, Rolf (31.05.2010) Der Neubau der Alten Nahebrücke - Die Zerstörung eines historischen Stadtbildes on www.regionalgeschichte.net. Retrieved 15 June 2018
