= Johannes Mötsch =

German archivist and historian (born 1949)

Johannes Mötsch (born 8 July 1949 in Bonn) is a German archivist and historian.

== Life ==
Johannes Mötsch studied History and Latin Philology from 1970 to 1978 at the Universität Bonn and graduated in 1979. In 1978 he started, as trainee teacher, the preliminary office at the Landeshauptarchiv Koblenz and attended the Archivschule Marburg until 1980. Until 1993 he worked at the Landeshauptarchiv Koblenz and taught in 1989 at the Marburger Archivschule. In 1993 he went to the thuringian Hauptstaatsarchiv Weimar, where he worked until 1997. In the same year he overtook as archive director the management of the Thüringisches Staatsarchiv in Meiningen.

He is a member of the Historische Kommission für Thüringen.

He is cousin of the physicist Martin Bodo Plenio

== Works (selection) ==
- Balduin von Luxemburg. Erzbischof von Trier — Kurfürst des Reiches 1285–1354. Festschrift aus Anlaß des 700. Geburtsjahres, hrsg. von Franz-Josef Heyen und Johannes Mötsch (Quellen und Abhandlungen zur mittelrheinischen Kirchengeschichte 53), Mainz 1985
- Regesten des Archivs der Grafen von Sponheim 1065–1437, Teil 1-5, bearbeitet von Johannes Mötsch, Landesarchivverwaltung Rheinland - Pfalz, 1987–1991
- Geschichtlicher Atlas der Rheinlande, Beiheft V/4: Die Grafschaften Sponheim, von Johannes Mötsch, Köln: Rheinland-Verlag, 1992
- Die ältesten Lehnsbücher der Grafen von Henneberg, bearbeitet von Johannes Mötsch und Katharina Witter, Weimar: Böhlau, 1996 - ISBN 3-7400-1013-4
- Fuldische Frauenklöster in Thüringen: Regesten zur Geschichte der Klöster Allendorf, Kapellendorf und Zella, Rhön, bearb. und eingel. von Johannes Mötsch, München u.a.: Urban und Fischer, 1999 - ISBN 3-437-31126-3
- Die Wallfahrt zu Grimmenthal: Urkunden, Rechnungen, Mirakelbuch, herausgegeben von Johannes Mötsch, Köln u.a.: Böhlau, 2004 - ISBN 3-412-14004-X
- Regesten des Archivs der Grafen von Henneberg-Römhild, Teilbände 1 und 2, herausgegeben von Johannes Mötsch, Köln u.a.: Böhlau, 2006 - ISBN 978-3-412-35905-8
