= Meginhard I of Sponheim =

Meginhard I (c. 1085-c. 1135) was a member of the House of Sponheim, succeeding his father, Stephan II, Count of Sponheim. His mother was probably Sophia of Formbach. His son was Gottfried I, Count of Sponheim.
