= Simon I of Sponheim-Kreuznach =

Simon I (born 1210/15; died 8 April 1264), son of Gottfried III, was the first ruling count of Sponheim and the first in the Sponheim-Kreuznach line of the house of Sponheim. He was succeeded by his eldest son John I.

His mother and father was Adelheid of Sayn (d. 1263) and Gottfried III, Count of Sponheim (b. 1775)

Simon had 11 siblings: Henry I of Sponheim, John I of Sponheim-Sayn, Eberhard of Sayn, Agnes of Sayn, Bertha of Sayn, and Henry III, count of Sayn, the other five are unknown.

His father died on the April 21, 1223, at age 48.

Simon I married Margareta of Sponhein (born von Heimbach) in 1240, at age 30.

They had 2 children: John I and
