= Henry I of Heinsberg =

German nobleman

Henry I
- Lord of Heinsberg
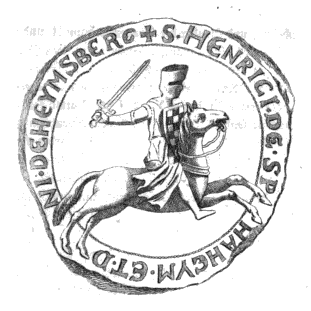
- Native name: Heinrich I von Heinsberg
- Born: around 1224
- Died: 1258
- Noble family: House of Sponheim
- Spouse: Agnes of Cleves
- Issue: Dirk II of Heinsberg; Aleida of Sponheim; John I of Heinsberg; Isalda of Heinsberg
- Father: Gottfried III, Count of Sponheim
- Mother: Adelheid of Sayn

Henry I, Lord of Heinsberg (died 1259) was a German nobleman. He was the second son of Gottfried III, Count of Sponheim and ruled as lord of Heinsberg from 1228 until his death.

== Life ==
Henry I was the second son of Count Gottfried III of Sponheim and his wife Adelheid of Sayn. He married Agnes of Cleves-Heinsber, daughter of Count Dietrich I of Falkenburg and Heinsberg sometime around 1228 - 1233. Through his marriage to Agnes, he inherited titles and possessions of the Lords of Heinsberg.

The first historical mention of the city of Heinsberg as a town occurs in a document issued by Henry in 1255.

== Issue ==
Henry I and Agnes of Cleves had 4 children:

- Dirk II of Heinsberg
- Aleida of Sponheim
- Johann I von Heinsberg
- Isalda of Heinsberg
