= Gottfried I of Sponheim =

Gottfried I, Count of Sponheim (c. 1115 - ff. 1183) was a member of the House of Sponheim, son of Meginhard I, Count of Sponheim. He was count of Sponheim from 1136 until his death, when he was succeeded by his son Gottfried II who was in turn was succeeded by his son Gottfried III.

He was a witness to a certain charter of Hildegard of Bingen, for Rupertsberg Convent, but his signature went missing.

Gottfried I was the ancestor of a number of counts and dukes, whose seat was Stonheim Castle, until 1437.
