= Henry I, Count of Sponheim-Starkenburg =

German nobleman

Henry I, Count of Sponheim (born between 1235 and 1240; died 1 August 1289) was a German nobleman of the house of Sponheim, son of John I. He was the count of Sponheim from 1266 until his death, he was succeeded by his son John II.
