= John I of Sponheim-Kreuznach =

German nobleman

John I, Count of Sponheim-Kreuznach (born 1245-1250; 28 January 1290) was a German nobleman. As eldest son he succeeded his father Simon I and was himself succeeded by his eldest son Simon II.
