= Walram, Count of Sponheim-Kreuznach =

German nobleman

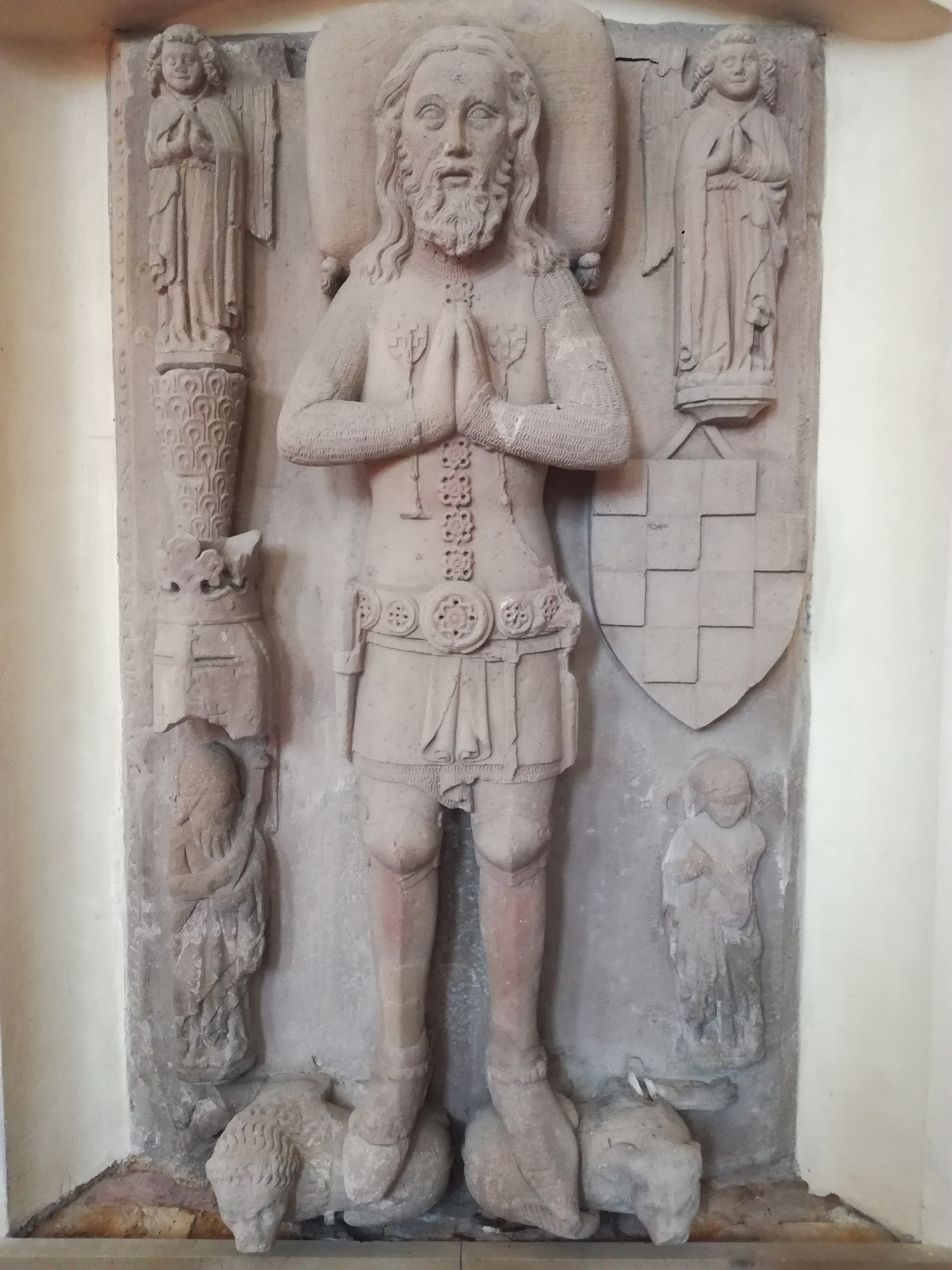

Walram (c. 1305 – 1380) was a German nobleman of the House of Sponheim. He succeeded his father Simon II, Count of Sponheim-Kreuznach.
