= Guttenberg =

There are several possible meanings for Guttenberg or Guttenburg:

== People ==
- Johannes Gutenberg (1400–1468), invented the moveable type printing press
- David Guttenberg (born 1951), U.S. state politician (Alaska)
- Enoch zu Guttenberg (1946–2018), German conductor, father of Karl-Theodor
- Fred Guttenberg, American activist against gun violence
- The House of Guttenberg, a Franconian noble family
- Johann Lorenz Trunck von Guttenberg (1661–1742), Mayor of Vienna 1713–1716
- Karl-Theodor zu Guttenberg, (born 1971), former Minister of Defence (Germany), son of Enoch zu Guttenberg
- Steve Guttenberg (born 1958), American actor

== Places ==
- Guttenberg, Bavaria, Germany
- Guttenberg, Iowa, United States
- Guttenberg, New Jersey, United States

== Guttenburg ==
- Guttenburg, a German brig that wrecked on the Goodwin Sands on 1 January 1860

== See also ==
- Gutenberg (disambiguation)
- Gutenburg (disambiguation)
