= Gutenburg =

Gutenburg may refer to:

- Gutenburg, Switzerland, Canton of Bern

== See also ==
- Johannes Gutenberg, German inventor of lead-based movable type for printing
- Guttenburg, a German brig wrecked on the Goodwin Sands on 1 January 1860
- Gutenberg (disambiguation)
- Guttenberg (disambiguation)
