= Gutenburg Castle =

- Burg Gutenberg, Guttenberg, Weitersheim, Weithersheim
- Gutenberg
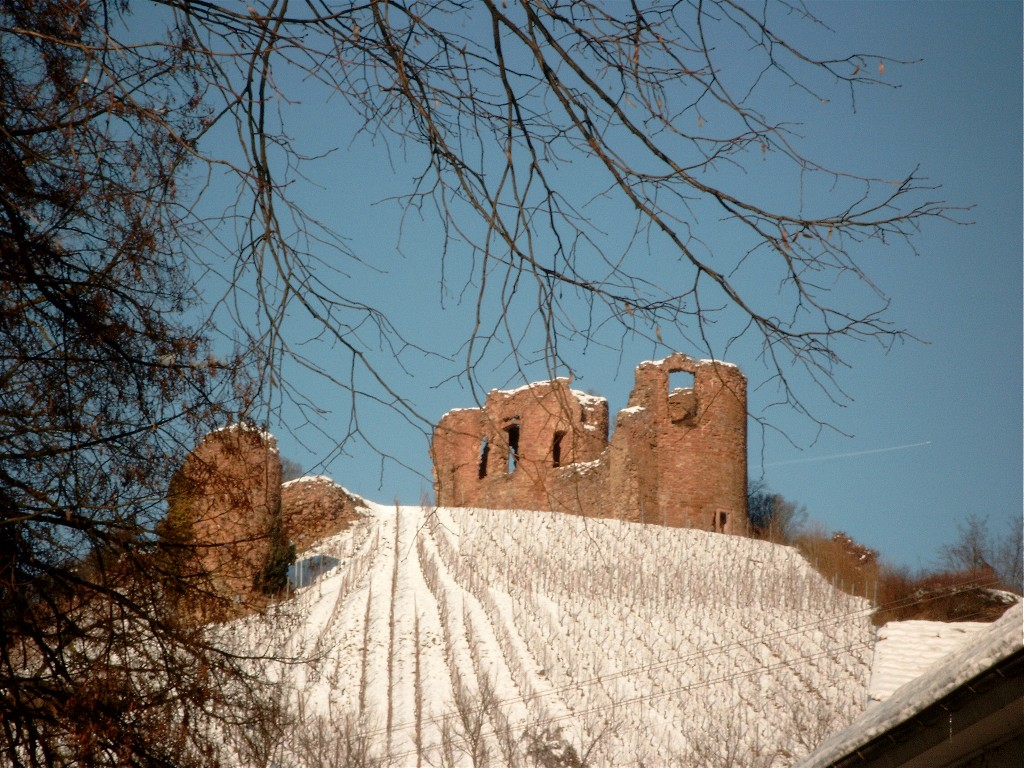
- The Gutenburg

Site information
- Type: hill castle
- Code: DE-RP
- Condition: curtain walls

Location
- Coordinates: 49°52′55″N 7°47′55″E
- Height: 223 m above sea level (NN)

Site history
- Built: around 1200

Garrison information
- Occupants: counts

Gutenburg Castle (German: Burg Gutenburg, also Gutenberg, Guttenberg, Weitersheim, or Weithersheim), is the ruin of a hill castle above the village of Gutenberg in the county of Bad Kreuznach in the German state of Rhineland-Palatinate.

== History ==
The castle is first recorded in 1213 as castro Weitersheim. In 1334 the counts of Sponheim (Lower County of Sponheim) sold the castle, which had meanwhile been renamed the Gutenburg. After the sale it underwent a major conversion. Following the extinction of the House of Sponheim (the Kreuzenach line died out in 1414 and the Starkenburg line in 1437) the castle went to the Lower Sponheim lords (mainly the Margraviate of Baden and Electoral Palatinate). The castle lost its importance over time, was destroyed during the Thirty Years' War and fell into ruins. In the copperplate by Daniel Meisner in the Thesaurus philopoliticus (published 1623f.) it is already portrayed as a ruin.

== Present day ==
Today the castle ruins are in private ownership.

== Layout ==
The castle consisted of an inner ward completely surrounded by a ring-shaped outer ward, protected by curtain walls with mural towers as well as a neck ditch. Considerable sections of the wall remain visible today.

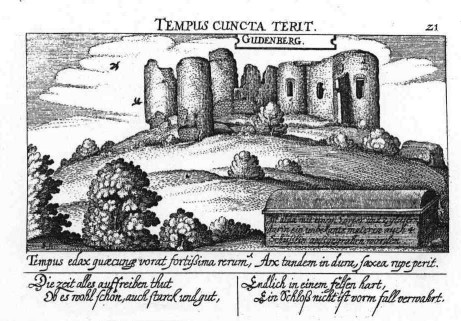
Gutenberg in a copperplate by Sebastian Furck/Daniel Meisner (before 1630)

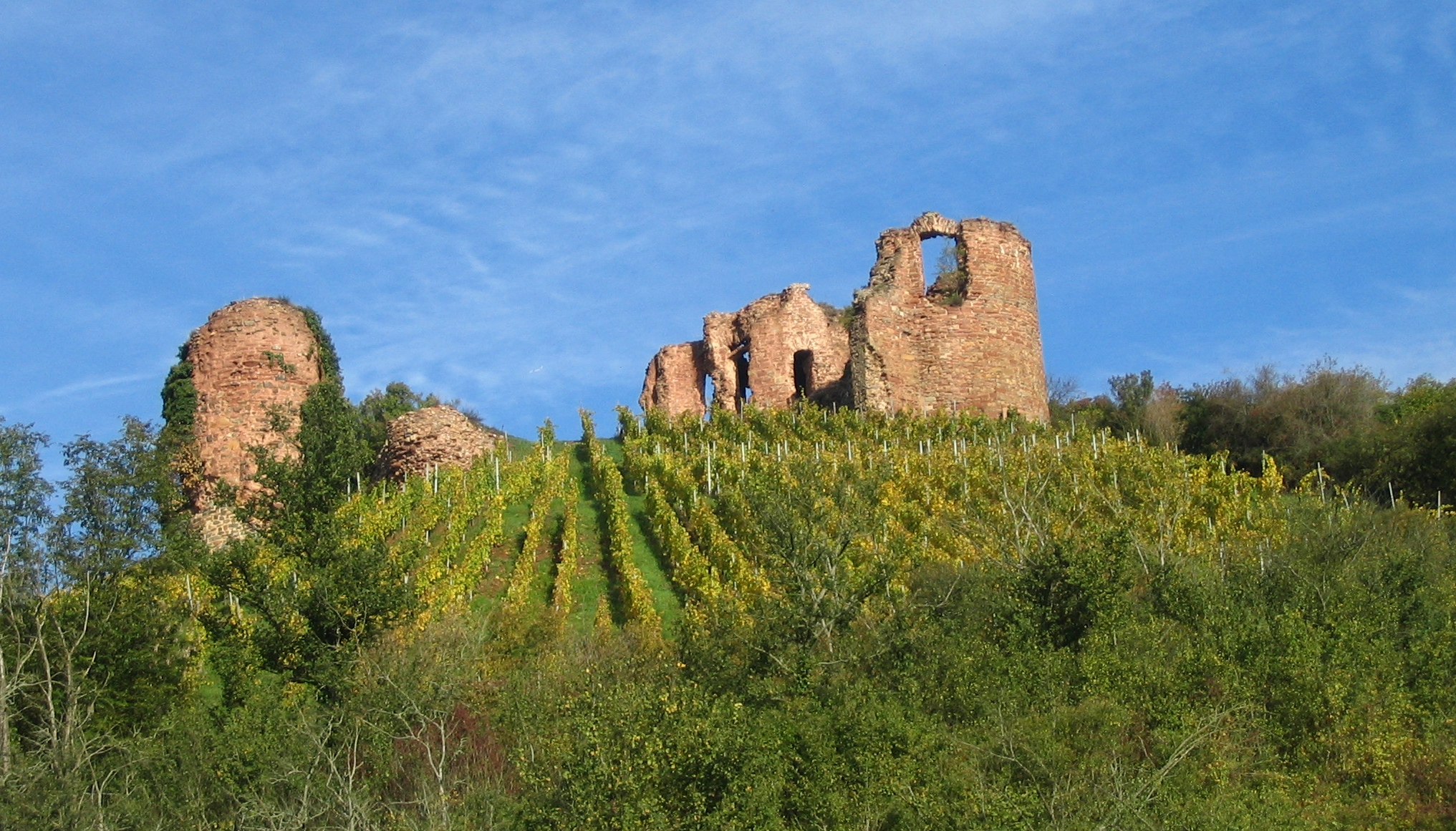
The Gutenburg at Gutenberg

== Literature ==
- Alexander Thon, Stefan Ulrich, Achim Wendt: „… wo trotzig noch ein mächtiger Thurm herabschaut“ - Burgen im Hunsrück und an der Nahe. 1st edn. Verlag Schnell und Steiner, Regensburg, 2013, ISBN 978-3-7954-2493-0, pp. 78–81.
- Friedrich-Wilhelm Krahe: Burgen des deutschen Mittelalters – Grundriss-Lexikon. Sonderausgabe. Flechsig Verlag, Wurzburg, 2000, ISBN 3-88189-360-1, p. 236.
