= Gottfried III of Sponheim =

German nobleman

Gottfried III, Count of Sponheim (born before 1183, probably in 1175; died 1218) was a German nobleman. He succeeded his father Gottfried II as Count of Sponheim.

== Life ==
In 1202 he married Adelheid von Sayn (died 1263), one of the two sisters and heirs of Henry III, the last count of Sayn. They had issue:

- John I, Count of Sponheim, founder of the Starkenburg line (Hintere Grafschaft) and von Sayn's heir
- Henry I, Lord of Heinsberg, founder of the Sponheim-Heinsberg line
- Simon I, Count of Sponheim, founder of the Kreuznach line (Vordere Grafschaft)
- Gottfried, priest at St George's, Cologne and St Cassius' Church, Bonn
- Walram, canon in Cologne

After Henry III's death in 1246/47 parts of Sayn fell to Gottfried's son John I, the founder of the Sponheim-Starkenburg line. Gottfried built the Kauzenburg at Kreuznach and thus came into conflict with the Bishopric of Speyer. In 1218 Gottfried joined the Fifth Crusade, in which he lost his life. His widow Adelheid remarried to Eberhard IV of Eberstein, owner of the lordship of Stauf and brother of Conrad of Eberstein, bishop of Speyer (died 1245).
