= Starkenburg, Rhineland-Palatinate =

Starkenburg
- Municipality
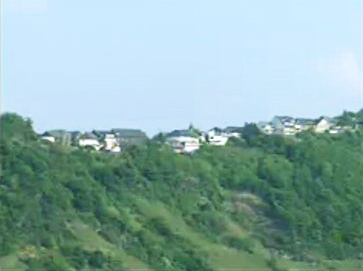
- View of one side of Starkenburg from a low level

- Coat of arms

- Location of Starkenburg within Bernkastel-Wittlich district
- Interactive map of Starkenburg
- Location within Germany Location within Rhineland-Palatinate
- Coordinates: 49°57′21″N 7°08′24″E
- Country: Germany
- State: Rhineland-Palatinate
- District: Bernkastel-Wittlich
- Municipal assoc.: Traben-Trarbach

Government
  - Mayor (2019–24): Jörg Emmerich

Area
  - Total: 1.52 km^{2} (0.59 sq mi)
- Elevation: 365 m (1,198 ft)

Population (2025-12-31)
  - Total: 204
  - Density: 134/km^{2} (348/sq mi)
- Time zone: UTC+01:00 (CET)
  - Summer (DST): UTC+02:00 (CEST)
- Postal codes: 56843
- Dialling codes: 06541
- Vehicle registration: WIL
- Website: www.starkenburg-mosel.de

Starkenburg is an Ortsgemeinde – a municipality belonging to a Verbandsgemeinde, a kind of collective municipality – in the Bernkastel-Wittlich district in Rhineland-Palatinate, Germany. It is the location of the like-named castle, now in ruins.

== Geography ==
The municipality lies on a 250 m-high ridge sloping down from the Hunsrück to the Moselle on the river’s right bank, downstream between Traben-Trarbach, the Ahringsbach valley and Enkirch. Towards the north, the village is bordered by a castle crag, where a few remnants of walls from the Starkenburg (castle) can still be discerned. Starkenburg is surrounded by unbroken greenbelt characterized by vineyards, woods, meadows and farms. Starkenburg belongs to the Verbandsgemeinde of Traben-Trarbach, whose seat is in the like-named town.

== History ==
The Romans were already using this place’s strategic location, in which they built a fort. The Roman fortification of the heights was a forerunner to the later castle. The complex is believed to have been destroyed by the Franks about 412.

In the Middle Ages, Starkenburg was from 1125 the residence of the County of Sponheim for the “Hinder” County; in 1350 it was relieved of this function by the newly built Grevenburg. The Sponheim noble family first appeared on the Moselle, according to documents, with Count Meginhard I of Sponheim in Enkirch in 1125. The first documentary mention of the castle as “Starkenberg” (not “Starkenburg”), in a directory of landholdings from Trier, comes from 1200.

The castle became well known in the 14th century because of the bold and dynamic Countess Loretta, Count Heinrich II’s young widow. Her great adversary was the eminent Archbishop and Elector of Trier Baldwin of Luxembourg, who would gladly have brought the bothersome “foreign body” within his Electorate that was the County of Sponheim under his sway. Countess Loretta, irreverently and boldly, had the great Baldwin taken prisoner in 1328 during a voyage on the Moselle and locked him up at her stronghold of Starkenburg in “honourable” detention. Neither the threats of Baldwin’s nephew the Emperor nor the Pope’s anathema could move the young and, it is said, attractive Countess to release the Archbishop. He was finally let go after having paid a high ransom and made sweeping political concessions, which itself led to further questions about his stay at Starkenburg. According to legend, the ransom was later used to build the Countess’s new dwelling – a “widow’s seat” – called Frauenburg (German: "lady's castle") near Frauenberg [sic] on the river Nahe.

About 1350, the Grevenburg in Trarbach became the seat of the Counts of Sponheim. In 1558, the Reformation was enforced throughout the Sponheim domains. The wars that came in the French Revolution’s wake swept the County of Sponheim away. At the Congress of Vienna, Starkenburg was annexed to Prussia. Since 1947, it has been part of the then newly founded state of Rhineland-Palatinate.

== Politics ==
=== Municipal council ===
The council is made up of 6 council members, who were elected by majority vote at the municipal election held on 7 June 2009, and the honorary mayor as chairman.

=== Coat of arms ===
The municipality’s arms might be described thus: Chequy of sixteen gules and argent.

=== Town partnerships ===
Starkenburg fosters partnerships with the following places:

- (Germany) Starkenberg, Altenburger Land, Thuringia

== Culture and sightseeing ==
=== Church ===
The Starkenburg Evangelical parish, which has 192 members, is parochially tied to Enkirch and belongs to the Simmern-Trarbach church district.

=== Sightseeing ===
- Starkenburg wall remnants
- Baroque church from 1764
- Historical construction

== Economy and infrastructure ==
Starkenburg is characterized by agriculture and tourism. At the tourists’ disposal are some 80 guest beds and two inns.
