= Siege of Trarbach =

1734 siege

- Part of the War of the Polish Succession
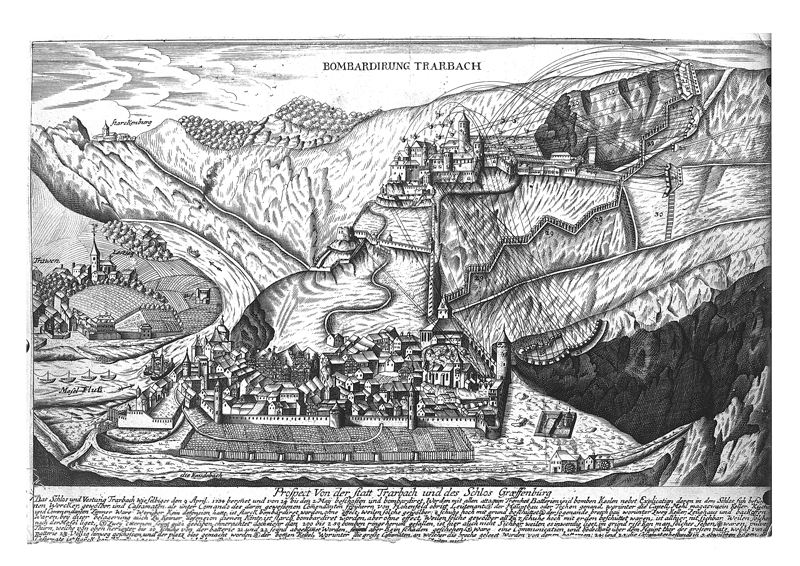
- An engraving depicting the bombardment of Trarbach and the Grevenburg
Date	10 April – 2 May 1734 (3 weeks and 1 day)
Location	Trarbach, Holy Roman Empire
Result	French victory

Belligerents
Kingdom of France	Holy Roman Empire

Commanders and leaders
Duc de Belle-Isle	Wilhelm Ludwig Freiherr von Hohenfeld

Strength
20,000	700

Casualties and losses
200	10

The siege of Trarbach (10 April – 2 May 1734) was conducted during the War of the Polish Succession by French troops against a garrison of troops of the Holy Roman Empire in the fortress at Trarbach in the County of Sponheim, a small principality of the Holy Roman Empire (Trarbach is now in Rhineland-Palatinate, Germany). The French, led by Marshal Belle-Isle, were victorious, and destroyed the fortress.
