= Georg Friedrich Kauffmann =

German composer and organist

- Born: 14 February 1679; Ostramondra, Thuringia
- Died: 24 March 1735 (aged 56)
- Occupations: Composer and Organist
- Era: Baroque

Georg Friedrich Kauffmann (14 February 1679 – 24 March 1735) was a Baroque composer and organist from northern-central Germany who composed primarily sacred works for the organ and voice.

== Biography ==
=== Early life and career ===
Georg Friedrich Kauffmann was born in Ostramondra, Thuringia. Little is known of his early life; however, he did have early keyboard training with J.H. Buttstett in Erfurt. His latter years of education were under J.F. Alberti in Merseburg with whom he studied organ and composition.

In 1698, Alberti suffered an injury to his right hand, inhibiting his ability to play the organ at the cathedral. Kauffmann replaced Alberti permanently as teacher in Merseburg as well as court and cathedral organist upon Alberti’s death in 1710.

Kauffmann is also attributed to have secured during this period the position of Director of Church Music for the Duke of Saxe-Merseburg, and might have also served as Kapellmeister. However, these positions are only speculative at best due to an absence of archival investigations. (Note: Kauffmann signed many of his published works as Court Organist and Director of Church Music for the Duke of Saxe-Merseburg, so it is quite likely that he did serve in such a capacity, even if just ceremonial.)

=== Mid-life and the Leipzig Affair ===
Kauffmann had several connections with Leipzig, as most predominant musicians of the time in Germany would have. At one point, he was originally asked by the university there to inspect the newly finished organ at St. Paul’s Cathedral (a very large honor at the time) – however, the offer ultimately went to Johann Sebastian Bach.

In 1725, Kauffmann announced his intentions of the publication of a treatise to be entitled: Introduzzione alla musica antica et moderna, das ist: Eine auführliche Einleitung zur alten und neuen Wissenschaft der edlen Music. (In English: Rules for Composition in the Old and New Styles.) It was never formally published, though it did circulate around the musical community of the day and most likely was used by many educators as a teaching tool.

Ultimately Kauffmann went to Leipzig in 1722 to compete for the position of Kapellmeister along with seven other predominant musicians of Germany at the time. The position of Kapellmeister of Leipzig was extremely coveted by most in the musical community; the position was formally held by Johann Kuhnau until his death that same year. Kauffmann’s audition went well, even though he asked for a second hearing by the town council who were responsible for hiring. He was the prime contender for the position until April 1723 when J.S. Bach was hired.

=== Late life and the Harmonische Seelenlust ===
A decade after the Leipzig Affair, Kauffmann started to publish in sequential volumes his Harmonische Seelenlust which were a complete edition of his organ chorales. However, he died of consumption in Merseburg on 24 March 1735 before they had been completely published. His widow saw the endeavor though and completed the publication of the Harmonische Seelenlust. While they did not make a great first impression, over the next century they became one of the most significant achievements in German organ music, and remained in high demand well into the 19th century. They consisted of ninety-eight preludes on sixty-three chorales. Many of his organ works can be found in organ text books and instructional materials today.

== Proliferation of works ==
=== Copied and transcribed works ===
An important aspect of Baroque composition was who copied the compositions down to perform in their churches or courts as printing music was very novel at the time and very expensive. J.G. Walther (a friend of Bach) copied many of his early works, as well as Johann Tobias Krebs, a pupil of Walther. Johann Kuhnau and two scribes copied parts from Kauffmann’s Solo Cantaten, and performed them on 16 August 1722, and after Kauffmann’s death in their respected churches. Gottfried Kirchhoff (the Halle organist) owned several other cantatas by Kauffmann, all of which were performed in Halle, however none of the manuscripts survived. In 1727, Wilhelm Friedemann Bach, who was studying in Merseburg with J.G. Graun, copied three choral works which were ultimately performed by J.S. Bach’s choir. (see The Bach Connection)

=== Well-known works ===
- Gelobet seist du, Jesu Christ
- Harmonische Seelenlust musikalischer Gonner und Freunde: Wer nur den lieben Gott lässt walten
- Nun danket alle Gott
- Nun lob, mein Seel, den Herren on Johann Gramann's hymn
- O Herre Gott, dein göttlich Wort
- O Jesulein süss
- Unverzagt, beklemmtes Herz
- Wie schön leuchtet der Morgenstern

== The Bach connection ==
One of the most important questions that surround Kauffmann’s life was how much of an influence was he upon Johann Sebastian Bach. While it can be hard to know who was imitating who, both of the works can be seen similar in certain motives and harmonic progressions, though it is obvious that Bach was the better master of these things. J.G. Walther’s friendship with Bach while transcribing some of Kauffmann’s early works can lead to influential questions, as well as Bach’s education of members of the Krebs family, Kuhnau’s employment by Bach in latter years (in which he brought at least three choral pieces to Bach's choir which they performed). Also Wilhelm Friedemann Bach, J.S. Bach’s eldest son, studied with Graun in Merseburg as well as transcribing some of Kauffmann works with Kuhnau. While there is little question of Bach’s awareness of Kauffmann, there are deeper questions of imitation and musical evolution.

== Today ==
Kauffmann was recently used as part of Itamar Moses’ play, Bach at Leipzig, in which he is seeking employment at the Thomaskirche in Leipzig upon the death of Johann Kuhnau, the Kapellmeister. The play uses Kauffmann as well as many other composers of the time all bidding for the job, which ultimately goes to J.S. Bach. See A Curtain Up Review; Bach at Leipzig for additional information.

== Selected recordings ==
Complete Sacred Works Collegium Vocale Leipzig, Merseburger Hofmusik, Michael Schönheit 2CD CPO 2023
