= Enkirch =

- Municipality
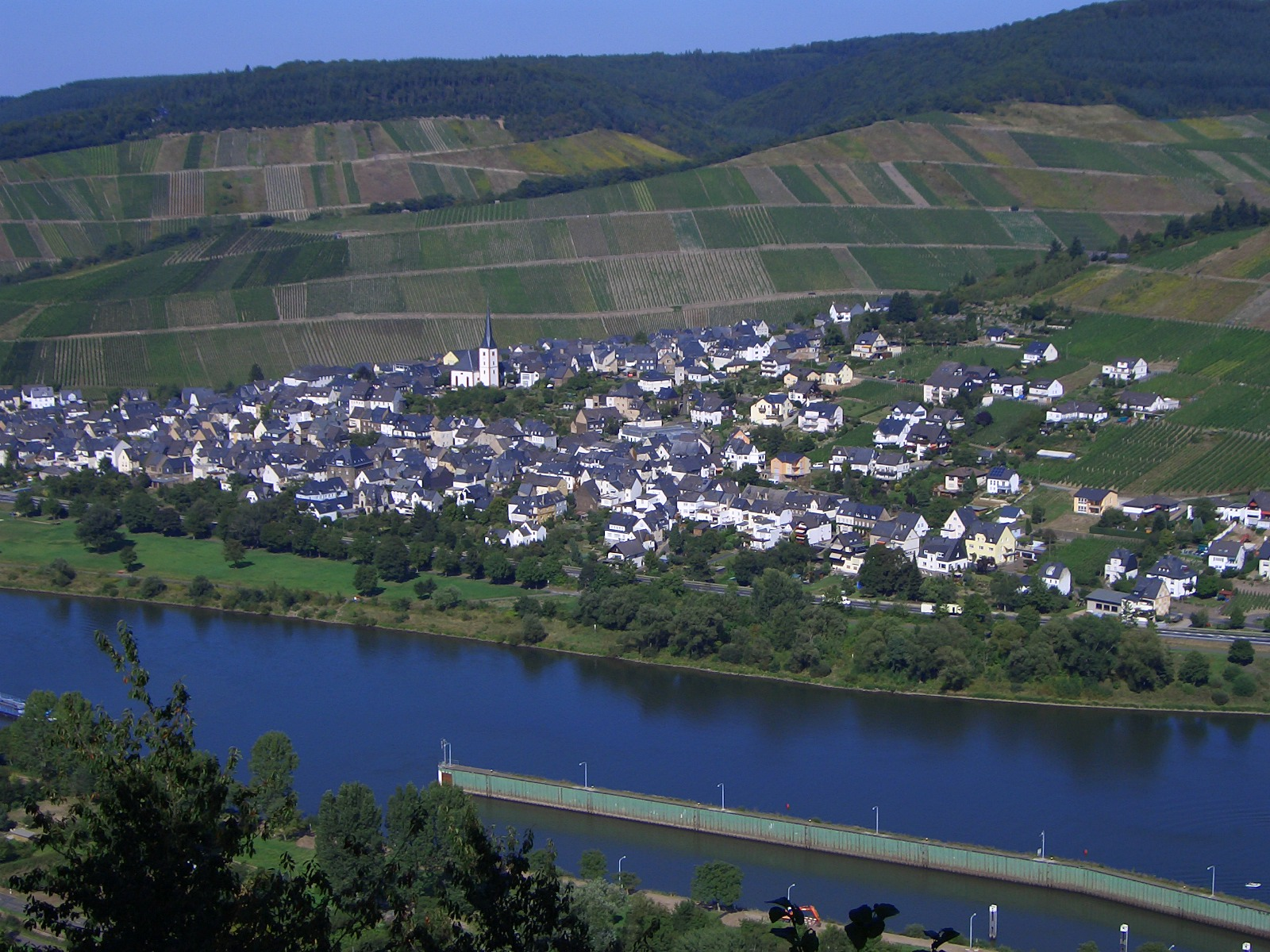

- Coat of arms

- Location of Enkirch within Bernkastel-Wittlich district
- Interactive map of Enkirch
- Location within Germany Location within Rhineland-Palatinate
- Coordinates: 49°58′59″N 07°07′36″E
- Country: Germany
- State: Rhineland-Palatinate
- District: Bernkastel-Wittlich
- Municipal assoc.: Traben-Trarbach

Government
  - Mayor (2019–24): Roland Bender (CDU)

Area
  - Total: 25.43 km^{2} (9.82 sq mi)
- Elevation: 105 m (344 ft)

Population (2025-12-31)
  - Total: 1,375
  - Density: 54.07/km^{2} (140.0/sq mi)
- Time zone: UTC+01:00 (CET)
  - Summer (DST): UTC+02:00 (CEST)
- Postal codes: 56850
- Dialling codes: 06541
- Vehicle registration: WIL
- Website: www.enkirch.de

Enkirch is an Ortsgemeinde municipality in the Bernkastel-Wittlich district in Rhineland-Palatinate, Germany.

== Geography ==
The municipality lies below Traben-Trarbach at the mouth of a branched brook, the Ahringsbach, coming from the Hunsrück on the Moselle’s right bank, and some 52 km south of Cochem. From Enkirch to its mouth on the Rhine at the Deutsches Eck in Koblenz, the Moselle covers a distance of 102 km. Near Enkirch is a weir on the Moselle.

Enkirch belongs to the Verbandsgemeinde, a collective low-level administration unit, of Traben-Trarbach, whose seat is in the like-named town.

== History ==
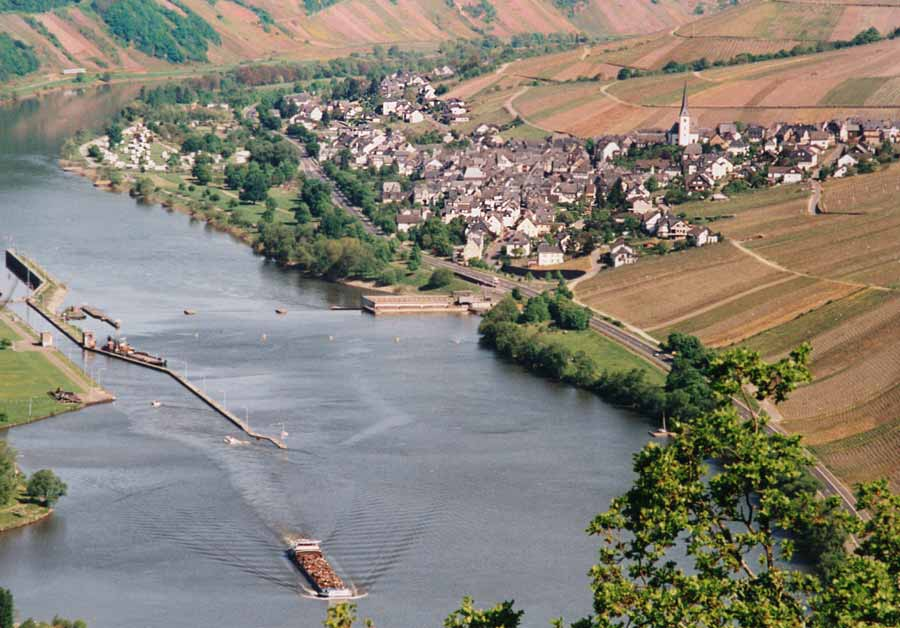
View of Enkirch from Starkenburg

It is assumed that there has been continuous habitation at what is now Enkirch for some 2,500 years, but the first traces of this go all the way back to the Stone Age.

Enkirch was already an important center as early as Celtic times, and then on into Roman times. On 1 April 733, Enkirch had its first documentary mention in the noblewoman Adela’s will as Anchiriacum. It was mentioned for the second time on 10 February 908 by King Ludwig IV when he donated the church and manse to Archbishop Radbod of Trier. The document in question refers to the village as Ancaracha. The municipality’s name evolved through the forms Enkricha, Einkirke and Enkerich before settling on today’s form, Enkirch.

Beginning in the 11th century, Enkirch belonged to the County of Sponheim. In the 12th century, the Sponheims built the Starkenburg (castle) above Enkirch. Sometime about the year 1240, the County was divided into the “Further” and “Hinder” County of Sponheim, or Sponheim-Kreuznach and Sponheim-Starkenburg.

In 1135, the Ravengiersburg Monastery built a pilgrimage chapel consecrated to Mary on Enkirch's outskirts. This chapel was later expanded into a collegiate church and then in 1685 it was incorporated into a newly founded Franciscan monastery. After Napoleon dissolved the monastery in the late 18th century, the church was turned over to the Catholic parish for their use.

As early as 1248, by virtue of being the Rear County seat, Enkirch was granted town and market rights along with its own jurisdiction. At that time, Enkirch was fortified and girded with a town wall and seven gates. After the feud between Countess Loretta of Sponheim and the Prince-Archbishop-Elector Baldwin of Trier, and his capture by the Countess in 1328, Loretta's son John III, Count of Sponheim-Starkenburg built a new castle near Trarbach, the Grevenburg. This brought about a shift of the Rear County seat to Trarbach, and thereby a loss of importance to Enkirch, even though it was considerably bigger than Traben and Trarbach put together, even into the 19th century. Since Enkirch was fortified but now had no castle, the church, which had been mentioned as early as 908, served as a fortress church.

In 1557, Frederick II of Simmern – later Frederick III, Elector Palatine – introduced the Reformation into the Oberamt of Trarbach. Since this time, the church has been Evangelical.

For its wineries, Enkirch was already well known very early on, as witnessed by 15 formerly ecclesiastical and comital winegrowing estates.

Because of the many timber-frame houses built in the 15th to 18th century, Enkirch is also called the Schatzkammer rheinischen Fachwerkbaues (“Treasury of Rhenish Timber Framing”).

== Religion ==
Some 1,100 of the inhabitants are Lutherans, while about 450 are Catholic.

== Politics ==
=== Municipal council ===
The council is made up of 16 council members, who were elected by proportional representation at the municipal election held on 7 June 2009, and the honorary mayor as chairman.

The municipal election held on 7 June 2009 yielded the following results:

	SPD	CDU	FWG	FDP	Total
2009	7	6	2	1	16 seats
2004	7	6	2	1	16 seats

=== Coat of arms ===
The German blazon reads: In Schwarz ein gestürzter Anker mit rot weißem Schach auf den Flunken.

The municipality's arms might in English heraldic language be described thus: Sable an anchor reversed Or, each of its flukes surmounted by an inescutcheon chequy argent and gules.

The German blazon does not mention the anchor's tincture, although it is shown as Or (gold) on the municipality's own website.

The anchor is likely a canting charge: the German word for “anchor” is Anker, which resembles Ankerich, among other former names that the municipality has had. The oldest composition of Enkirch's arms goes back to 1248 and already shows the two inescutcheons with the checked pattern (“chequy”), the Sponheim armorial bearing. Over time, though, the two inescutcheons were charged differently, and at one point, a third one even appeared. Once Baden and a Palatine sideline (Palatinate-Simmern, later Palatinate-Zweibrücken or Palatinate-Birkenfeld) had come into ownership of the “Hinder” County of Sponheim, the two inescutcheons showed the Palatine Lion and the Baden bend (slanted stripe), while a third inescutcheon at the bottom of the anchor showed the Sponheims’ arms. In the late 19th century, though, the old arms were reinstated.

== Culture and sightseeing ==
=== Buildings ===
Enkrich is home to two noteworthy churches, one Lutheran and one Catholic.

Very colorful old timber-frame houses can be found in narrow, picturesque laneways evoking the atmosphere of the Middle Ages.

In the area near the church meadow are also remnants of the mediaeval town fortifications.

As well as its historical timber-frame houses, Enkirch also has many Classicist buildings built between the mid 19th century and the end of the First World War, among which is the imposing old village school. This is no longer used as a school, but together with the Terstegen-Haus, it houses, among others, the local music club. There is now a modern primary school in the village center.
