= Hettenrodt =

- Municipality
- Coat of arms

- Location of Hettenrodt within Birkenfeld district
- Interactive map of Hettenrodt
- Location within Germany Location within Rhineland-Palatinate
- Coordinates: 49°44′30″N 07°15′16″E
- Country: Germany
- State: Rhineland-Palatinate
- District: Birkenfeld
- Municipal assoc.: Herrstein-Rhaunen

Government
  - Mayor (2014–29): Markus Schulz

Area
  - Total: 5.32 km^{2} (2.05 sq mi)
- Elevation: 440 m (1,440 ft)

Population (2025-12-31)
  - Total: 639
  - Density: 120/km^{2} (311/sq mi)
- Time zone: UTC+01:00 (CET)
  - Summer (DST): UTC+02:00 (CEST)
- Postal codes: 55758
- Dialling codes: 06781
- Vehicle registration: BIR
- Website: www.hettenrodt.de

Hettenrodt is an Ortsgemeinde – a municipality belonging to a Verbandsgemeinde, a kind of collective municipality – in the Birkenfeld district in Rhineland-Palatinate, Germany. It belongs to the Verbandsgemeinde Herrstein-Rhaunen, whose seat is in Herrstein.

== Geography ==
The municipality lies on the east side of a ridge between the Idarbach and the Siesbach in the Vorderhunsrück and borders directly on the town of Idar-Oberstein. The municipal area measures 532 ha, of which some 120 ha is state forest. The actual village itself covers 29 ha. The municipal area has a rather odd shape, which has given it its unusually long municipal limit of roughly 20 km. The village centrepoint has an elevation of 410 m above sea level, and the municipality's highest point, the fort near Kirschweiler, lies at 623 m above sea level.

Hettenrodt lies on the Deutsche Edelsteinstraße (“German Gem Road”) and within both the Naturpark Saar-Hunsrück and the Wildenburg hiking area.

== History ==
Of protohistoric times in what is now Hettenrodt, very little is known. It is likely, however, that running over the ridge set north-south between the Idarbach and the Siesbach (two small rivers), from the Silberich towards the Steinkaulenberg (two mountains) was a Roman road. Since the Romans used, cared for and even guarded all springs that lay near their roads, it can be assumed that at that time – about the year 1 – there was already a small settlement, or perhaps a fort, on the “Kremel”.

There is no doubt that the Sielburg, a site lying in the cadastral area known as Flur 1, within Hettenrodt's limits, which is sometimes mistakenly called the Kirschweiler Festung (“Kirschweiler Fort”), is a prehistoric ringwall that, as archaeological finds have shown, was also used in Roman and Carolingian times and on into the Early Middle Ages.

The name “Hettenrodt”, though, with the ending —rodt (“clearing”), shows that the village arose at the time of the third Frankish settlement period. Professor Dr. Baldes writes in his local history of the Birkenfeld countryside: “In 1262, Ritter (roughly “Sir”) Wilhelm von Schwarzenberg had serfs there, because of whom he had disagreements with the Count of Sponheim, whose vassal he was.”

Beginning in 1321, the village cropped up under the names Hettelrodt and Hettenrodt in feudal bonds of the Idarbann (a feudal domain), and shared fate with its outlying village, Idar. To this day, Hettenrodt’s mother church stands in Idar, and no other places in the old Idarbann show such conformity in their local speech as Idar and Hettenrodt.

Even in the Middle Ages, Hettenrodt was already no longer purely a farming village. The areas that could be used for cropraising were small and with their sparse soil on slopes yielded less than ample harvests, especially for big families. Cloth and stocking making thus became prevailing livelihoods alongside agriculture among the villagers, until the important upswing brought by the gem-cutting industry in the Idar-Oberstein area in the 18th century.

Since the Steinkaulenberg was right nearby, only a half hour’s walk from the village along a path, it could be that some tried their luck as quarrymen in the galleries there. Others built gem-cutting mills on the Idarbach. Chroniclers report that most mill owners whose mills were Am Katzenloch (a prepositional expression, but used as a proper name; it means “At the Cat Hole”) were inhabitants of Hettenrodt.

After the Second World War, Hettenrodt changed for the better. The gem industry was once again the basis of the local economy, as well as full employment in all other fields of business. Ethnic Germans driven out of Germany's former eastern territories sought housing and work in Hettenrodt, too, as they did throughout Germany. This need for housing kept growing. In 1952, the municipality built a house in which four refugee families found shelter. In 1953, two Schwedensiedlungen (“Sweden settlements”; so-called because the wooden houses had been donated by the Swedish government) were built on the village's outskirts, and two refugee families who had been driven out of their land moved in. These two new centres and a third one built in 1960 took the meadows and fields forsaken by smallhold farmers and put them to work. The village's appearance changed quickly. Barn gates, which in the late 1940s were to be seen on almost every house, were replaced with garage doors; stables and barns became modern dwellings. Streets were tarred to handle the ever growing motorized traffic using them. Between 1965 and 1975, the whole village was provided with sewerage and street lighting was modernized.

Several new building developments were opened (Birkenweg, Struthwiese, Karrenweg, Unter dem Karrenweg, Am Dicken Stein). Meanwhile, a few children's playgrounds were also laid out. Even the graveyard underwent an overhaul. Work began on a mortuary in 1969. The graveyard itself was expanded in 1973, and a belltower was added in 1980.

In 1984, Hettenrodt became the first municipality in Rhineland-Palatinate to own its own grocery shop. After buying out the Keppler business in the village centre in 1972, the municipality had the house torn down in 1983, from whose rubble arose the shop. It was acquired by the municipality the following year.

In 1965, the former village pond on the “Kremel” was expanded into a swimming pool, and at the same time served as the fire pond. In the late 1980s, the complex was converted into a biotope.

In 1974, some of the inhabitants expressed a wish for Hettenrodt to be amalgamated into the town of Idar-Oberstein, but this never came to pass.

A pilot project in 1983 saw all 300 households in the village hooked up to cable television. Hettenrodt's population was then some 700. Since then it has risen to almost 800.

German reunification in 1990 spurred the establishment of a partnership with a municipality in the former East Germany, Kleinneuhausen in Thuringia.

== Politics ==
=== Municipal council ===
The council is made up of 8 council members, who were elected by majority vote at the municipal election held on 7 June 2009, and the honorary mayor as chairman.

=== Mayor ===
Hettenrodt's mayor is Markus Schulz.

=== Coat of arms ===
The municipality's arms might be described thus: Per bend chequy gules and argent and vert a lime tree eradicated Or.

=== Town partnerships ===
Hettenrodt fosters partnerships with the following places:

- (Germany) Kleinneuhausen, Sömmerda, Thuringia
