= Johann Friedrich Alberti =

German composer and organist

- Born: January 11, 1642; Tönning, Schleswig
- Died: June 14, 1710 (aged 68); Merseburg, Saxony-Anhalt
- Era: Baroque

Johann Friedrich Alberti (11 January 1642 – 14 June 1710) was a German composer and organist.

Alberti was born in Tönning, Schleswig, Denmark-Norway. He received his musical training in Leipzig from Werner Fabricius and in Dresden from Vincenzo Albrici. Then he worked as an organist in Merseburg cathedral until his departure in 1698 caused by the paralysis of his right hand because of a stroke. His pupil Georg Friedrich Kauffmann succeeded him as a princely Saxon townsman and cathedral organist at the court of the Saxon duke and Merseburg Cathedral.

Alberti's works include chorale preludes, 35 choral arrangements, 12 ricercati (lost) and various sacred works. He died, aged 68, in Merseburg, Saxony-Anhalt.

== List of selected works ==
- Gelobet seist du
- Herzlich lieb hab ich dich, o Herr, on Schalling's hymn
- O lux beata Trinitas or Der du bist drei in Einigkeit
- Te Deum
