= Jost Maurer =

German mason, architect and construction entrepreneur

Johann von Trarbach (born around 1530 in the area around the Moselle, died 15.11.1586 in Simmern, was also known as Jost Maurer) was a German mason, architect and construction entrepreneur. His nickname means 'Jost, the stonemason' in German.

Whilst the circumstances of his time learning masonry and architecture remain unknown, a certificate of appointment shows that he became the Master to servant of the Palatinate Governor Frederick III. von Simmern in 1557. The first work that has been safely linked to him is the Grave monument of Gf. Philip III von Hanau near the Hanauer Marienkirche (1563).

Jost Maurer carried out the expansion of the Wolf monastery (north of Traben-Trarbach) around 1498 and erected the portico on the Trarbach church in 1518.
