= Kleinneuhausen =

- Municipality
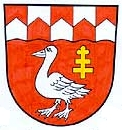
- Coat of arms

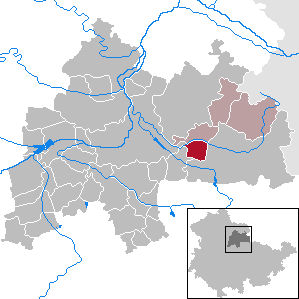
- Location of Kleinneuhausen within Sömmerda district
- Interactive map of Kleinneuhausen
- Location within Germany Location within Thuringia
- Coordinates: 51°8′N 11°16′E
- Country: Germany
- State: Thuringia
- District: Sömmerda
- Municipal assoc.: Kölleda

Government
  - Mayor (2021–27): Michael Köhler

Area
  - Total: 8.46 km^{2} (3.27 sq mi)
- Elevation: 148 m (486 ft)

Population (2025-12-31)
  - Total: 431
  - Density: 50.9/km^{2} (132/sq mi)
- Time zone: UTC+01:00 (CET)
  - Summer (DST): UTC+02:00 (CEST)
- Postal codes: 99625
- Dialling codes: 036372
- Vehicle registration: SÖM
- Website: www.kleinneuhausen-thuer.de

Kleinneuhausen is a municipality in the Sömmerda district of Thuringia, Germany.

== Town partnerships ==
Kleinneuhausen fosters partnerships with the following places:

- (Germany) Hettenrodt, Birkenfeld, Rhineland-Palatinate.
