= Rastenberg =

- Town
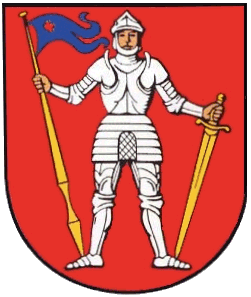
- Coat of arms

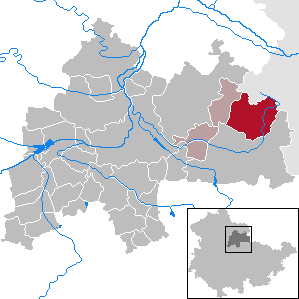
- Location of Rastenberg within Sömmerda district
- Interactive map of Rastenberg
- Location within Germany Location within Thuringia
- Coordinates: 51°10′34″N 11°25′9″E
- Country: Germany
- State: Thuringia
- District: Sömmerda
- Municipal assoc.: Kölleda

Government
  - Mayor (2024–30): Beatrix Winter

Area
  - Total: 35.52 km^{2} (13.71 sq mi)
- Elevation: 205 m (673 ft)

Population (2025-12-31)
  - Total: 2,360
  - Density: 66.4/km^{2} (172/sq mi)
- Time zone: UTC+01:00 (CET)
  - Summer (DST): UTC+02:00 (CEST)
- Postal codes: 99636
- Dialling codes: 036377
- Vehicle registration: SÖM
- Website: www.rastenberg.de

Rastenberg (German pronunciation: [ˈʁastn̩ˌbɛʁk]) is a town in the district of Sömmerda, in Thuringia, Germany. It is situated 22 km east of Sömmerda, and 23 km northeast of Weimar.

== History ==
Within the German Empire (1871-1918), Rastenberg was part of the Grand Duchy of Saxe-Weimar-Eisenach.
