= Kölleda (Verwaltungsgemeinschaft) =

- Verwaltungsgemeinschaft
- Map of Sömmerda highlighting Kölleda
- Interactive map of Kölleda
- Location within Germany Location within Thuringia
- Coordinates: 51°10′N 11°18′E
- Country: Germany
- State: Thuringia
- District: Sömmerda
- Seat: Kölleda
- Subdivisions: 4 municipalities

Area
  - Total: 74.34 km^{2} (28.70 sq mi)

Population (2025-12-31)
  - Total: 3,864
  - Density: 51.98/km^{2} (134.6/sq mi)
- Time zone: UTC+01:00 (CET)
  - Summer (DST): UTC+02:00 (CEST)
- Website: www.vgem-koelleda.de

Kölleda is a Verwaltungsgemeinschaft ("collective municipality") in the district of Sömmerda, in Thuringia, Germany. The seat of the Verwaltungsgemeinschaft is in the town Kölleda, itself not part of the Verwaltungsgemeinschaft since January 2021.

The Verwaltungsgemeinschaft Kölleda consists of the following municipalities:

1. Großneuhausen
2. Kleinneuhausen
3. Ostramondra
4. Rastenberg
