= Großneuhausen =

- Municipality
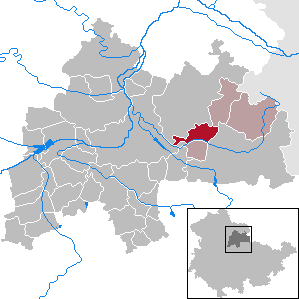
- Location of Großneuhausen within Sömmerda district
- Interactive map of Großneuhausen
- Location within Germany Location within Thuringia
- Coordinates: 51°9′N 11°17′E
- Country: Germany
- State: Thuringia
- District: Sömmerda
- Municipal assoc.: Kölleda

Government
  - Mayor (2020–26): Torsten Köther

Area
  - Total: 11.87 km^{2} (4.58 sq mi)
- Elevation: 148 m (486 ft)

Population (2025-12-31)
  - Total: 636
  - Density: 53.6/km^{2} (139/sq mi)
- Time zone: UTC+01:00 (CET)
  - Summer (DST): UTC+02:00 (CEST)
- Postal codes: 99625
- Dialling codes: 036372
- Vehicle registration: SÖM
- Website: www.grossneuhausen.net

Großneuhausen is a municipality in the Sömmerda district of Thuringia, Germany.
