= Ostramondra =

- Municipality
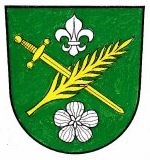
- Coat of arms

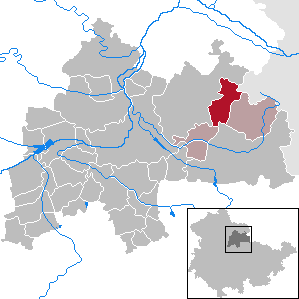
- Location of Ostramondra within Sömmerda district
- Interactive map of Ostramondra
- Location within Germany Location within Thuringia
- Coordinates: 51°12′N 11°20′E
- Country: Germany
- State: Thuringia
- District: Sömmerda
- Municipal assoc.: Kölleda

Government
  - Mayor (2021–27): Madeline Temme

Area
  - Total: 18.37 km^{2} (7.09 sq mi)
- Elevation: 187 m (614 ft)

Population (2025-12-31)
  - Total: 437
  - Density: 23.8/km^{2} (61.6/sq mi)
- Time zone: UTC+01:00 (CET)
  - Summer (DST): UTC+02:00 (CEST)
- Postal codes: 99636
- Dialling codes: 036378
- Vehicle registration: SÖM
- Website: www.ostramondra.de

Ostramondra is a municipality in the Sömmerda district of Thuringia, Germany.
