= Grevenburg =

Coordinates: 49°56′48″N 7°06′56″E

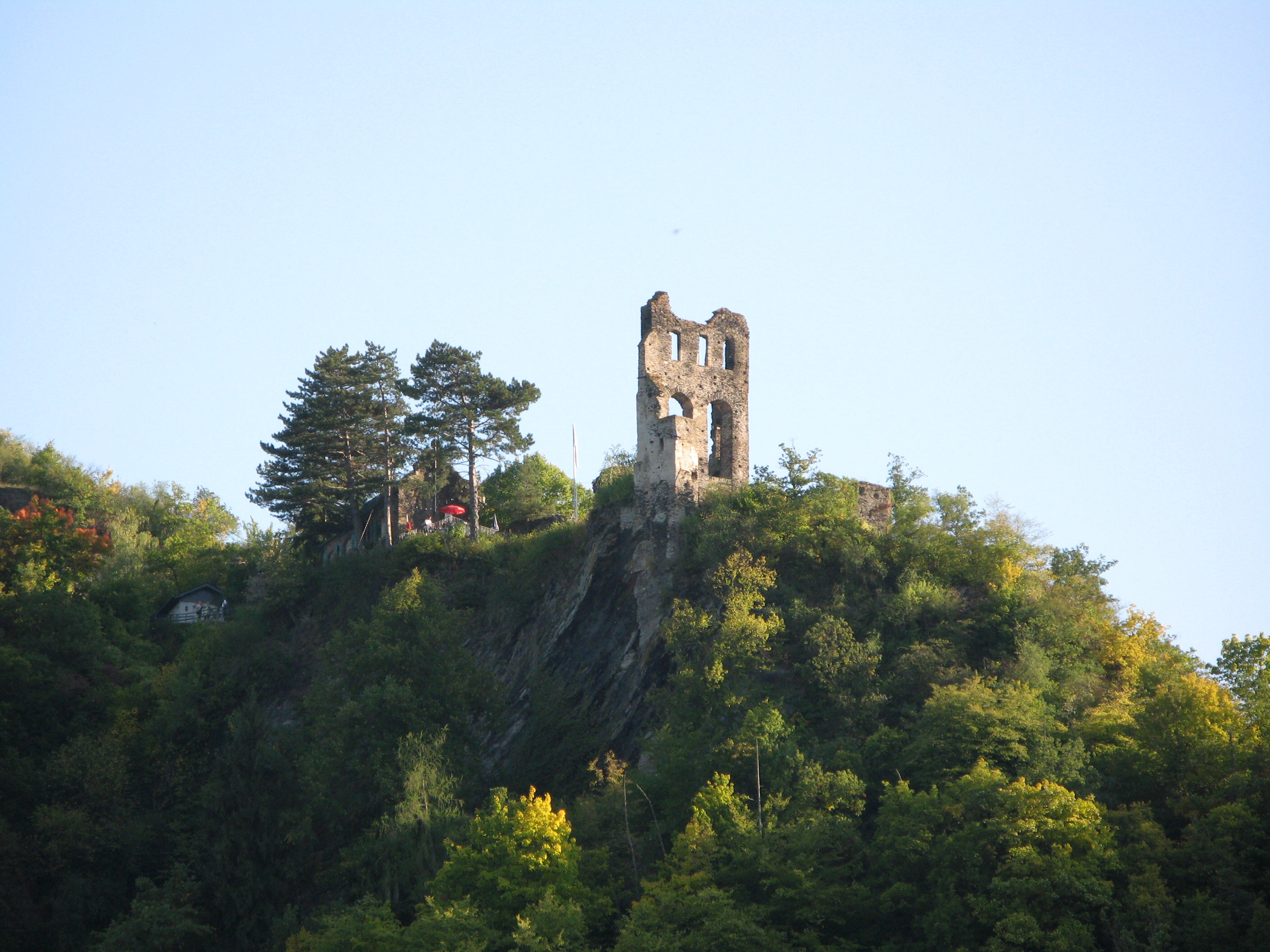
Ruins (2008) of Castle Grevenburg

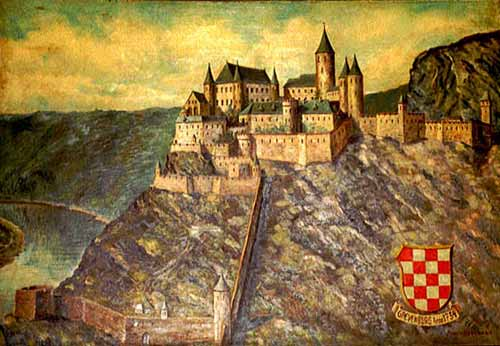
A contemporary depiction of the castle at its greatest extent

Grevenburg was a castle in Traben-Trarbach in the federal state of Rhineland-Palatinate in Germany. It was the residence of the Rear County of Sponheim and today is a ruin following its destruction by the French in 1734.

== History ==
The castle was built in 1350 by the Count Johann III of Sponheim-Starkenburg and replaced Castle Starkenburg as the residence of the Rear County of Sponheim. With the extinction of the ruling male line of the Rhenish branch of the House of Sponheim in 1437 the castle became seat of the bailiff of the new Counts to Sponheim (Baden and Palatinate-Simmern or Palatinate-Zweibrücken or Palatinate-Birkenfeld).

In 1680 it was conquered by Louis XIV of France and was extended, together with the fort of Mont Royal in the horseshoe bend of the Mosel north of the town of Traben-Trarbach as a part of the fortifications. During the War of the Spanish Succession (1701–1714), in 1702 it was taken by the French under Tallard and in 1704 on the express orders of the commanding officer John Churchill, 1st Duke of Marlborough it was overpowered by Friedrich of Hesse-Kassel. The badly damaged castle was then occupied by the Dutch. In 1730 it was repaired by the Electorate of Trier for the defence of Koblenz and the Rhine river. In the War of the Polish Succession it was taken after three weeks' siege for the fourth and last time by the French who destroyed it in July 1734. The castle was blown up, huge chunks of it have plunged into the valley beneath.

Of the castle, although only the western wall of the former keep remains, the foundations are largely intact

== Gallery ==
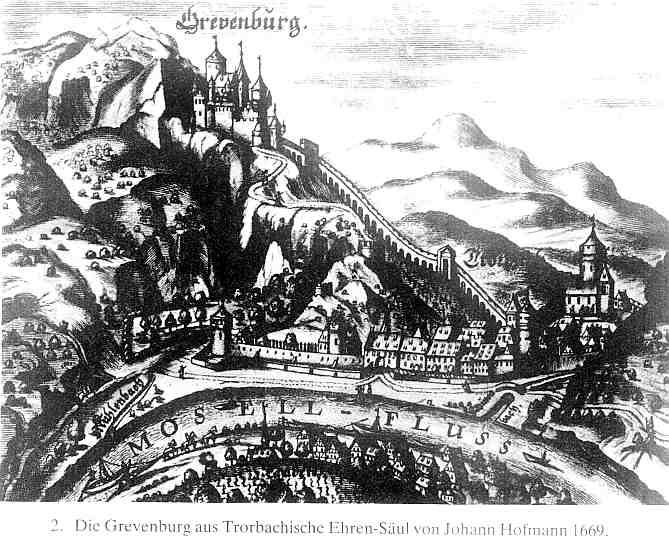
Johann Hofmann, 1669

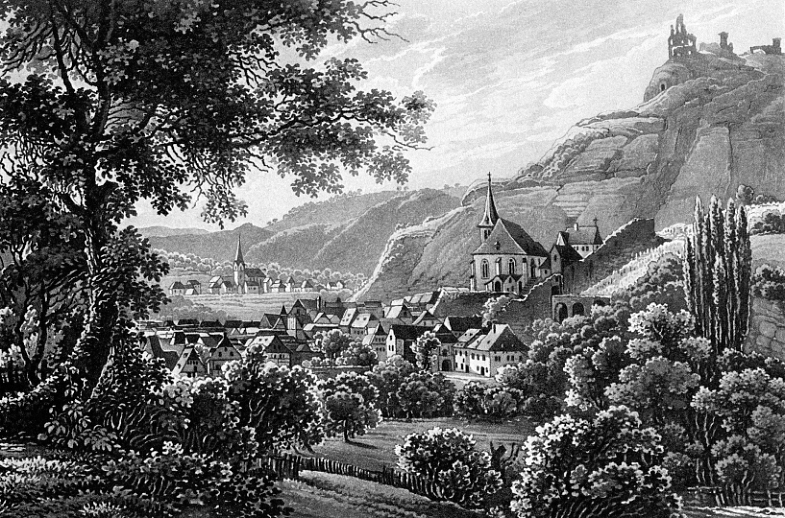
Traben-Trarbach and Grevenburg on the Mosel (Karl Bodmer, 1841)

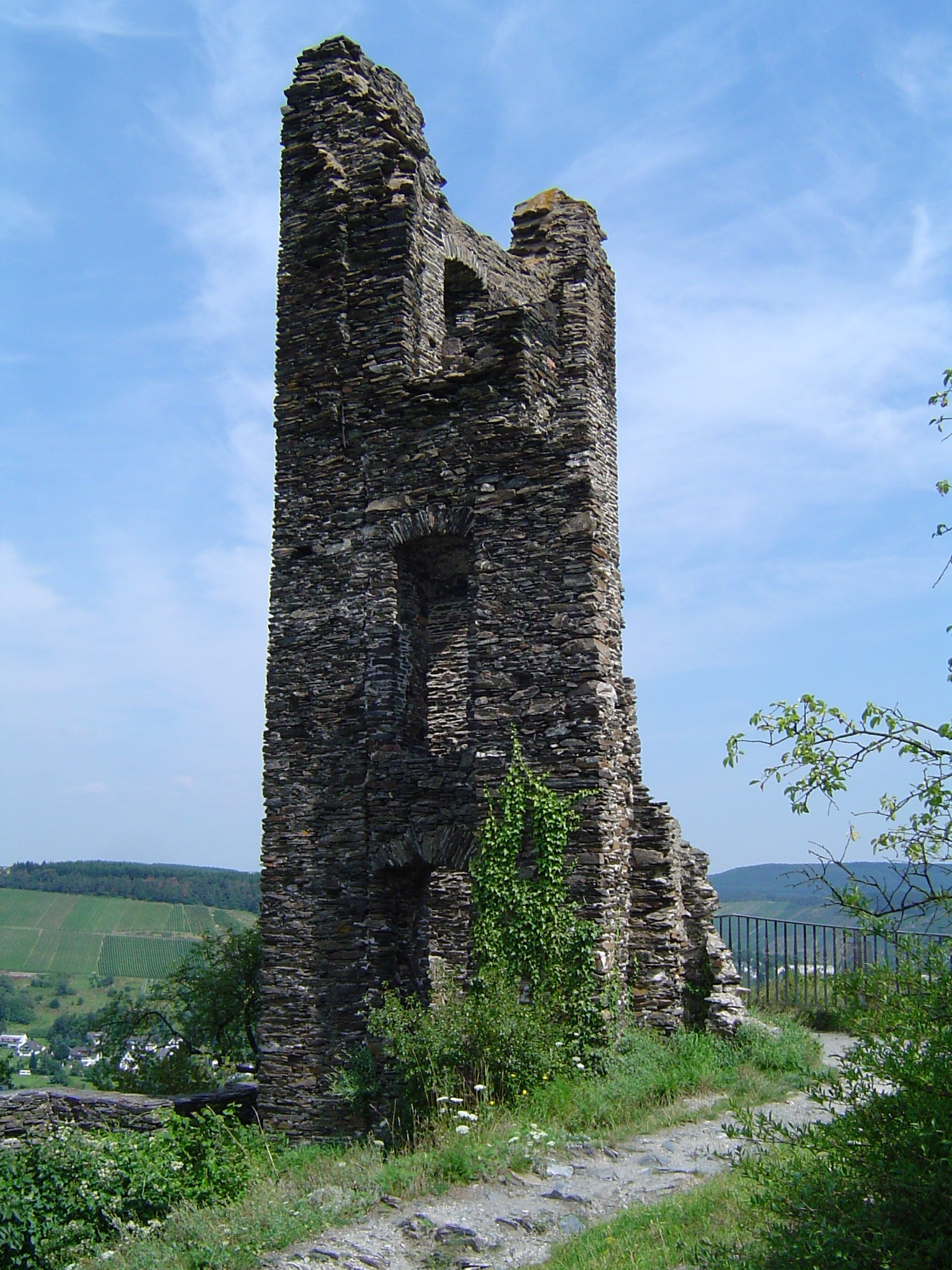
Ruins of the keep

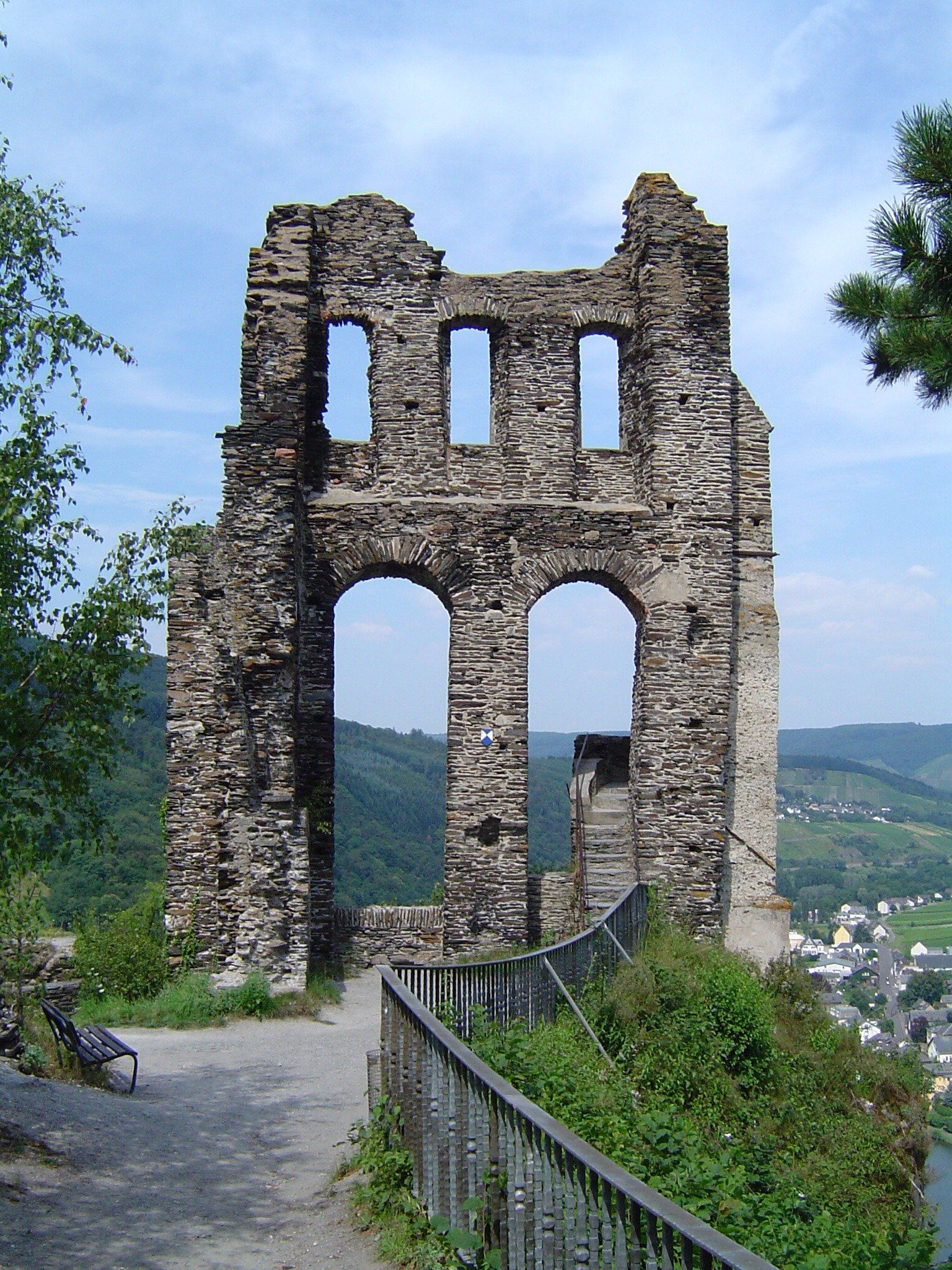
Ruins of the keep

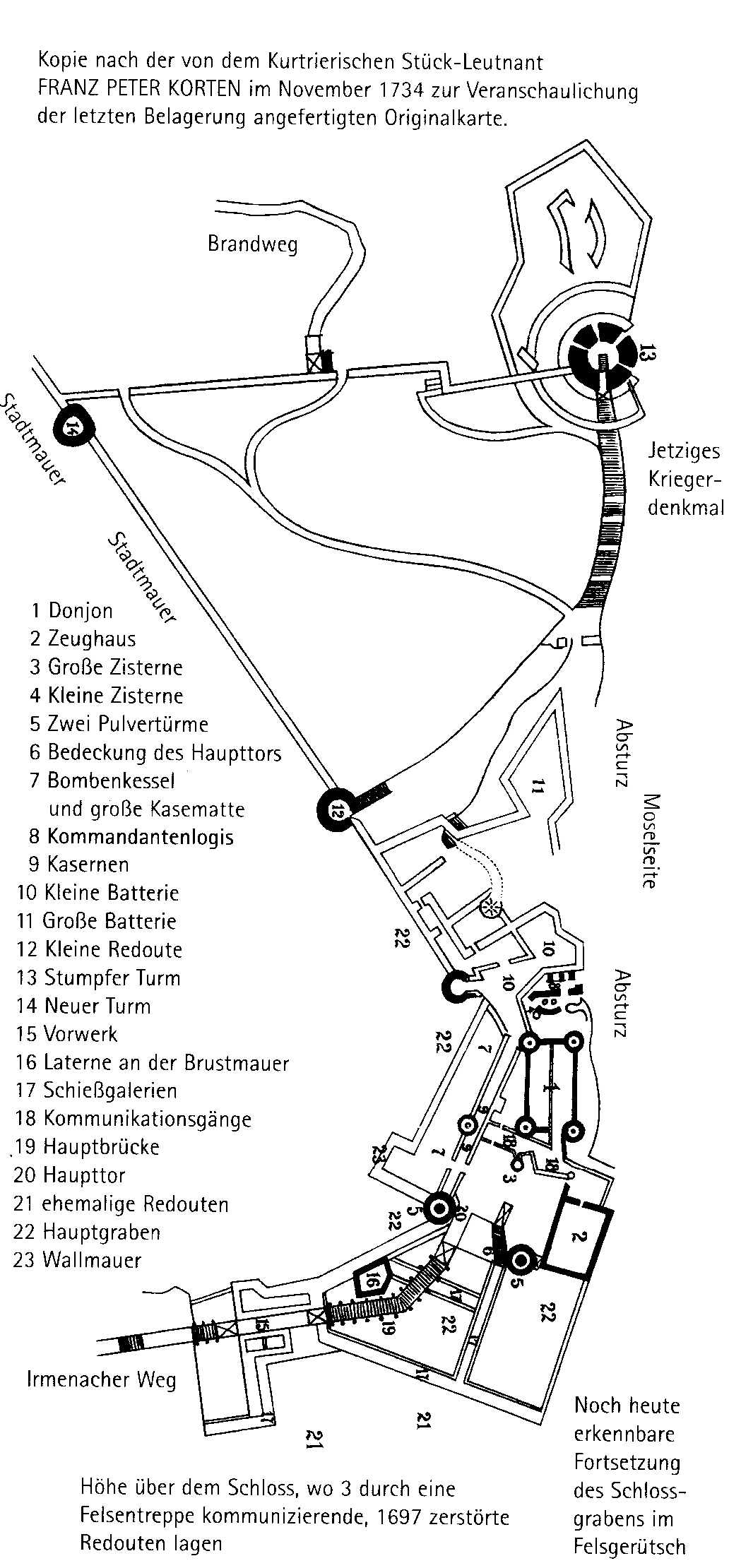
Plan, 1734
