= Traben-Trarbach =

Town in Germany

- Town
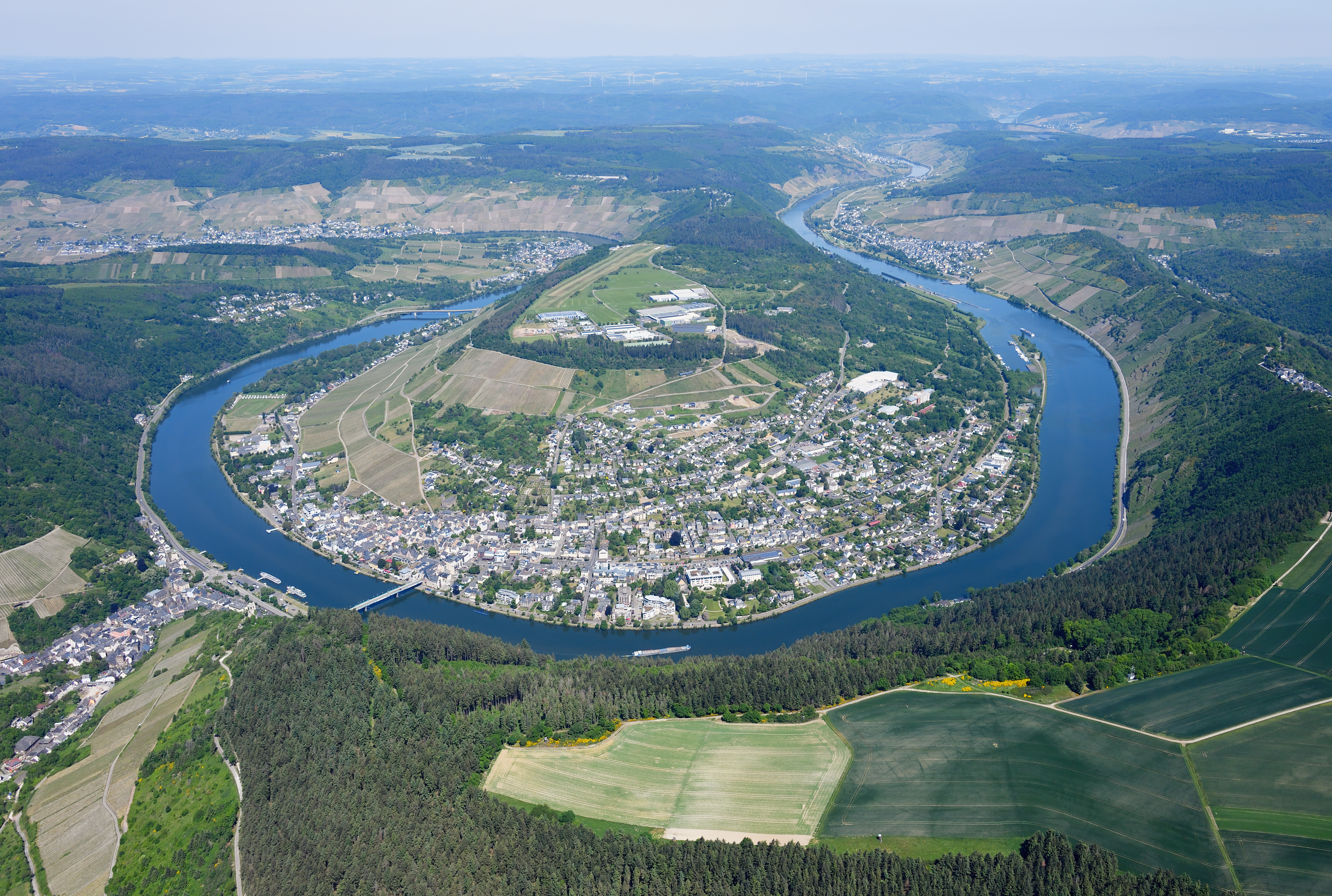
- Aerial view of Traben-Trarbach

- Coat of arms

- Location of Traben-Trarbach within Bernkastel-Wittlich district
- Interactive map of Traben-Trarbach
- Location within Germany Location within Rhineland-Palatinate
- Coordinates: 49°57′04″N 7°07′00″E
- Country: Germany
- State: Rhineland-Palatinate
- District: Bernkastel-Wittlich
- Municipal assoc.: Traben-Trarbach

Government
  - Mayor (2019–24): Patrice Langer (SPD)

Area
  - Total: 31.35 km^{2} (12.10 sq mi)
- Elevation: 110 m (360 ft)

Population (2025-12-31)
  - Total: 5,399
  - Density: 172.2/km^{2} (446.0/sq mi)
- Time zone: UTC+01:00 (CET)
  - Summer (DST): UTC+02:00 (CEST)
- Postal codes: 56841
- Dialling codes: 06541
- Vehicle registration: WIL / BKS
- Website: www.traben-trarbach.de

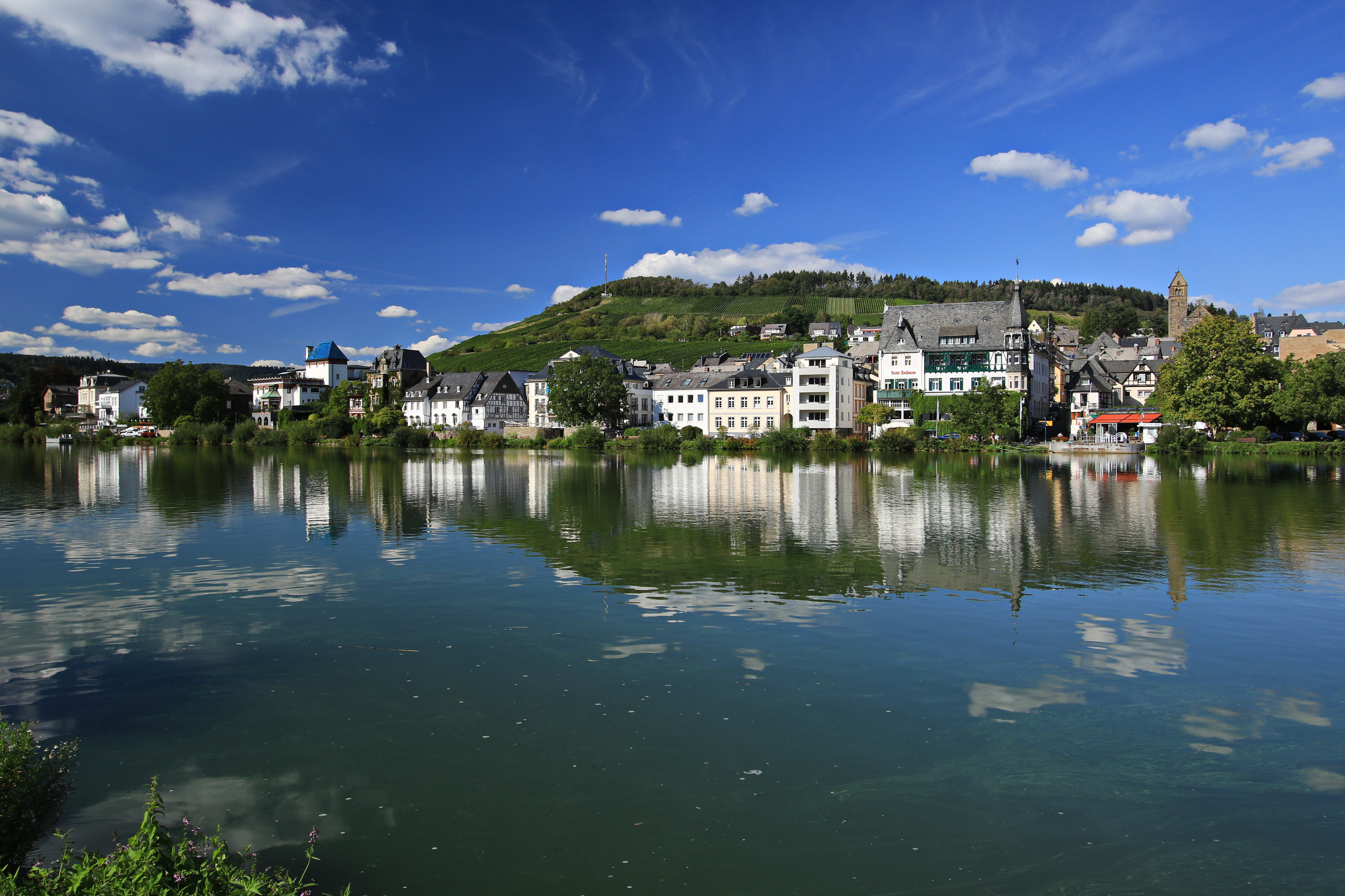
Traben on the Moselle

Traben-Trarbach (German pronunciation: [ˌtʁaːbn̩ ˈtʁaːɐ̯bax]) on the Middle Moselle is a town in the Bernkastel-Wittlich district in Rhineland-Palatinate, Germany. It is the seat of the like-named Verbandsgemeinde and a state-recognized climatic spa (Luftkurort). The city is located in the Valley of Dawn.

== Geography ==
=== Location ===
Traben-Trarbach lies some 40 kilometres (25 mi) northeast of Trier and some 60 km (37 mi) southwest of Koblenz in the valley of the Middle Moselle. North of the town is found the mountain inside a bend in the Moselle, Mont Royal. Frankfurt-Hahn Airport in the Hunsrück lies some 10 km (6.2 mi) away towards the east (in each case, as the crow flies). The municipal area spreads over a total of 31.35 km^{2} (12.10 sq mi) with a great share of this being wooded. This makes Traben-Trarbach the biggest town by land area on the Middle Moselle.

Traben lies on the Moselle river's left bank at the foot of the former fort of Mont Royal, and Trarbach lies on the right bank on the Hunsrück side. While Traben stretches in a broad strip along the river, Trarbach instead stretches inland between rather steep mountains, particularly up the Kautenbach valley.

=== Constituent communities ===
Traben-Trarbach's Stadtteile, besides Traben and Trarbach, are Litzig, Wolf, Bad Wildstein, Rißbach, Kautenbach and Hödeshof.

== History ==
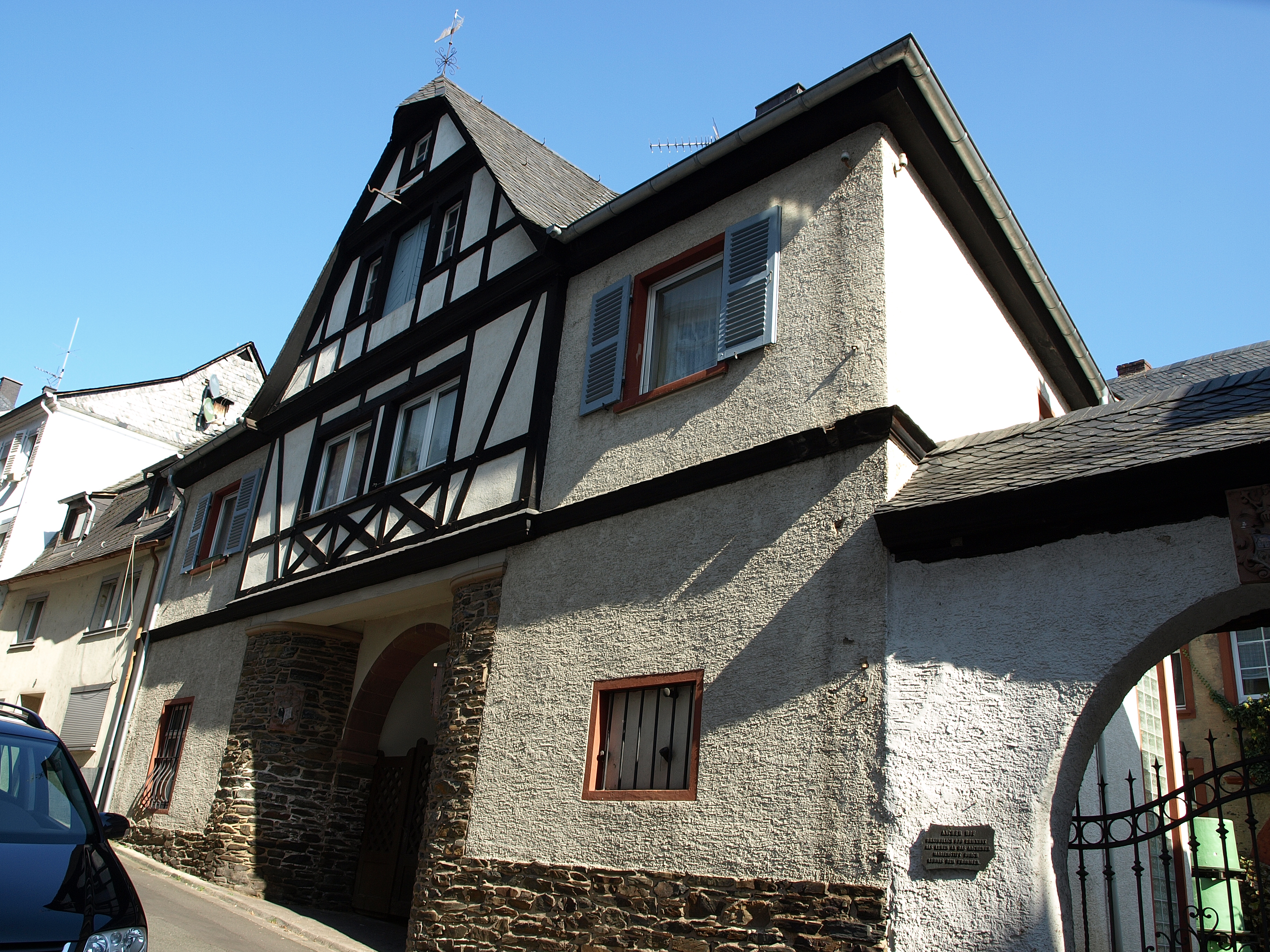
Aachener Hof, plaque inscription: "Urkundlich 830 erwähnt als Lehen an das Aachener Marienstift durch Ludwig den Frommen." (see main text)

As early as 830, the Aachener Hof (estate) had a documentary mention. Emperor Louis the Pious, Charlemagne's son, donated Traben with all its rights and privileges, and its appurtenances, namely Litzig, Rißbach, Irmenach and Beuren, to the minster at Aachen (Aachen Foundation of Mary), where German kings were crowned.

In the 17th century, the town was part of what was then known as Rhenish Franconia, a strategic area fought over by France and the Holy Roman Empire. Seized by France in the 1683–1684 War of the Reunions, Traben was the location for the new fortress of Mont-Royal, constructed by Vauban, the leading military engineer of the period. The main ramparts were 30 metres (98 ft) high and 3 km (1.9 mi) long, with space for 12,000 troops; despite the enormous cost, it was demolished when the French withdrew following the 1697 Treaty of Ryswick and only the lower foundations are visible today.

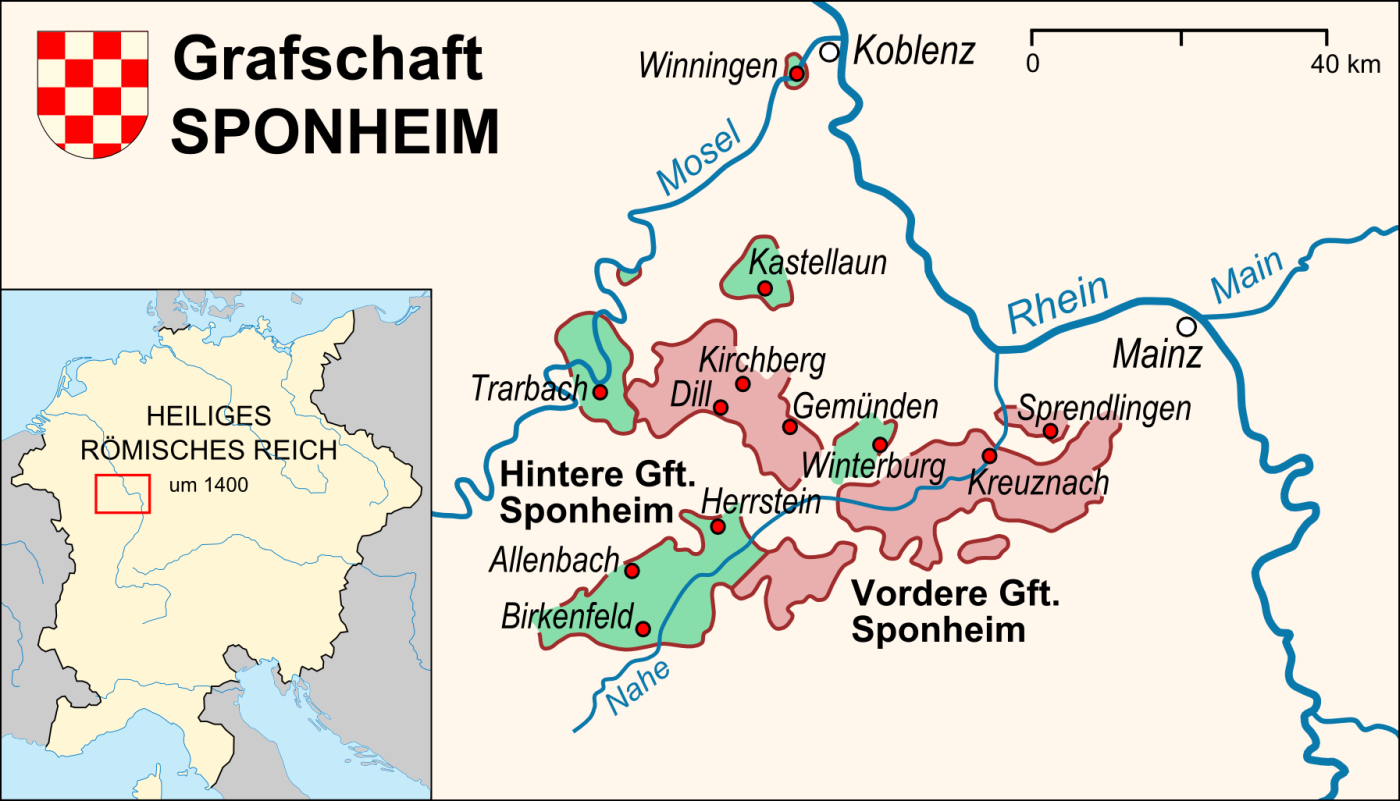
County of Sponheim (c. 1804)

All today's Stadtteile – with the exception of a part of Kautenbach – belonged to the Hintere (English: rear, back, i.e. hinterland; Upper) County of Sponheim, whose main centre was Trarbach. After the comital family of Sponheim died out, the inheriting landholders formed the County into a Palatine-Badish condominium and had their residences elsewhere in the county, namely in Birkenfeld and Kastellaun. Trarbach was also the seat of a Palatine oberamt, the Oberamt Trarbach.

In 1816, the area around Trarbach was annexed to Prussia, with Trarbach itself becoming the seat of a Bürgermeisterei ("Mayoralty"). Against expectations, however, Zell, rather than Trarbach, was made the district seat, even though the latter was the biggest place in the new District of Zell. The Bürgermeisterei of Trarbach was dissolved in 1884, and Trarbach no longer belonged to any Bürgermeisterei. It was, rather, administered thereafter in personal union with the new Bürgermeisterei of Traben. In 1898, the first bridge was built between the two centres, one built to plans drawn up by Bruno Möhring. This bridge, which was blown up in the dying days of the Second World War in 1945, was at the same time also the first roadbridge between Bernkastel and Koblenz. The next bridges were built only in 1924, in Cochem, and between 1951 and 1953 in Zell. In the late 19th century, Traben and Trarbach were also, together with Reichenhall, the first municipalities in Germany that, instead of having gaslamps, installed electric street lighting from the Edison Company (today AEG), although the odd stretch of street in Berlin had already been outfitted with electric lighting. In 1904, the municipality of Traben and the town of Trarbach merged to become the town of Traben-Trarbach. The next changes came on 7 June 1969, when the municipalities of Kautenbach and Wolf were amalgamated with Traben-Trarbach. One year later, the Verbandsgemeinde of Traben-Trarbach was newly formed. It has its administrative seat in the town; Traben-Trarbach is a member municipality of the Verbandsgemeinde, a kind of collective municipality.

As they belonged to the "Hinder" County of Sponheim, the Reformation was introduced into Traben and Trarbach, with the town remaining even today mainly Evangelical, even though newcomers, particularly in the 19th and 20th centuries, have raised the Catholic share of the population markedly. The Evangelical Church's leadership in the Hinder County of Sponheim was at first exercised from the Birkenfeld chancellery. Then, in 1672, a Hinder-Sponheim Lutheran consistory was instituted, whose duties were transferred to the consistory in Zweibrücken in 1776.

In 1818, the Synod of Trarbach was established, whose seat remained in Trarbach until 1972. Because of its size – the synod encompassed the districts of Bernkastel, Zell and Trier – this was divided in 1825. The outlying centre of Wolf belonged until 1892 to the Synod of Trier, which itself, until 1843, bore the name "Synod of Wolf" as that was the superintendent's home.

== Politics ==
=== Town council ===
The council is made up of 22 council members, who were elected by proportional representation at the municipal election held on 25 May 2014, and the honorary mayor as chairwoman.

Year	SPD	CDU	Grüne	FDP	WGR	Total
2014	9	7	2	1	3	22 seats
2009	6	10	-	2	4	22 seats
2004	5	11	-	2	4	22 seats

=== Mayor ===
The mayor is Patrice Langer (SPD).

=== Coat of arms ===
The town's arms might be described thus: Per fess enhanced, chequy of 18 gules and argent a horse trotting sable and chequy of twenty-four argent and gules on a mount of three vert in base a round tower Or with six windows, three and three, and an arched doorway, of the second, and a conical roof of the third.

The checkerboard pattern ("chequy") was the arms borne by the Counts of Sponheim. Above the line of partition is a black horse, whose attitude is "trotting" for a reason: this makes it a canting charge, for the German word for "trot" is traben – part of the town's hyphenated name. Traben's name, however, which comes from a Celtic name, Traven, a description of a small settlement, has nothing whatsoever to do with a horse. The tower below the line of partition stands for the local castle in Trarbach and therefore for Trarbach itself.

The arms have been borne since 1951.

=== Town partnerships ===
Traben-Trarbach fosters partnerships with the following places:

- Wangen bei Olten, Solothurn, Switzerland, with the town of Traben-Trarbach
- Selles-sur-Cher, Loir-et-Cher, France with the Verbandsgemeinde of Traben-Trarbach

== Culture and sightseeing ==
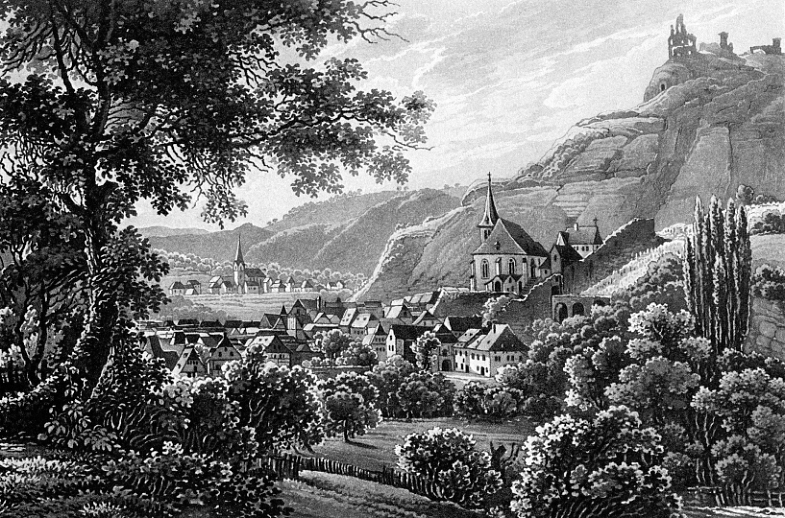
The town of Trarbach on the Moselle (in the foreground) with the Grevenburg and Traben (in the background). Aquatint by Karl Bodmer about 1831.

=== Buildings ===
- Ruins of the Grevenburg, built about 1350, destroyed, after many sieges, in 1734
- Starkenburg, 250 m (820 ft) above the Moselle with castle crags at the end of town going towards Enkirch
- Mont Royal Fort (1687–1698) (large French fort under Louis XIV built by Vauban)
- Brückentor ("Bridge Gate") at the Moselle Bridge, 1899 by Bruno Möhring
- Mittelmoselmuseum ("Middle Moselle Museum") about the history of the Moselle valley, the County of Sponheim, Mont Royal Fort and the Grevenburg
- Parkschlösschen Bad Wildstein ("Little Park Palace"), the town's former spa and bathing house built by Bruno Möhring
- Trarbach Town Hall (Rathaus), 1833 by Ferdinand Nebel
- Huesgen house, Am Bahnhof (a street), 1904 by Bruno Möhring
- Dr. Breucker house, An der Mosel (a street), 1905 by Bruno Möhring
- Former winery, Julius Kayser & Co., Wolfer Weg, 1906–1907 by Bruno Möhring
- Former hotel "Clauss-Feist" (now Bellevue), 1903 by Bruno Möhring
- Former Gondenau slate and ore mine
- Town tower in Trarbach with view over the roofs of Trarbach
- Former Post Office in Traben, Baumeister Matthias Engel

=== Motorboat racing ===
For decades there were motorboat races on the Moselle, but the 32nd and last racing event was held in 1996. At these races, many world and European champions were crowned, among them, in 1964, the well known Berlin motorboat racer and builder Dieter König.

== Economy and infrastructure ==
Traben-Trarbach is home to a large number of wineries including Robert Heuser, F. W. Langguth Erben, Richard Böcking, Ulrich Langguth, Martin Müllen, Weiser-Künstler and Daniel Vollenweider.

=== Transport ===
==== Rail ====
Through Traben-Trarbach, until 31 December 1962, ran the Moseltalbahn (railway), locally known as the Saufbähnchen. The railway station building on the Trarbach side was torn down during expansion work on Bundesstraße 53.

In Traben, across the river on the left bank is found the terminal station on the Moselwein-Bahn ("Moselle Wine Railway"), which runs to Bullay. The old station building, built in 1904 on the model of old Traben timber-frame houses, is still standing and serves today as the mayor's seat and as an event venue. The new stop was moved 150 m (490 ft) downstream to the area where the former goods station once was.

Traben-Trarbach is located in the area of the transport association Verkehrsverbund Region Trier (VRT) as well as in the transitional fare zone number 175 of the transport association Verkehrsverbund Rhein-Mosel (VRM).

==== Air ====
In 1956, a sport airfield (Flugplatz Traben-Trarbach/Mont Royal) on Traben's mountain, Mont Royal, was built (ICAO-Code: EDRM).

Frankfurt-Hahn Airport is c. 17 km (11 mi) (on foot) to the east of Traben-Trarbach.

==== Bridges ====
Traben-Trarbach is located on both sides of river Moselle. It is served via three bridges:

- Moselbrücke in the heart of the town, connecting Traben and Trarbach (completed in 1899)
- Wolfer Brücke, connecting Wolf with Bundesstraße 53
- A third bridge between Rißbach and Koppelberg, as Bundesstraße 53 crosses the river

== Gallery ==
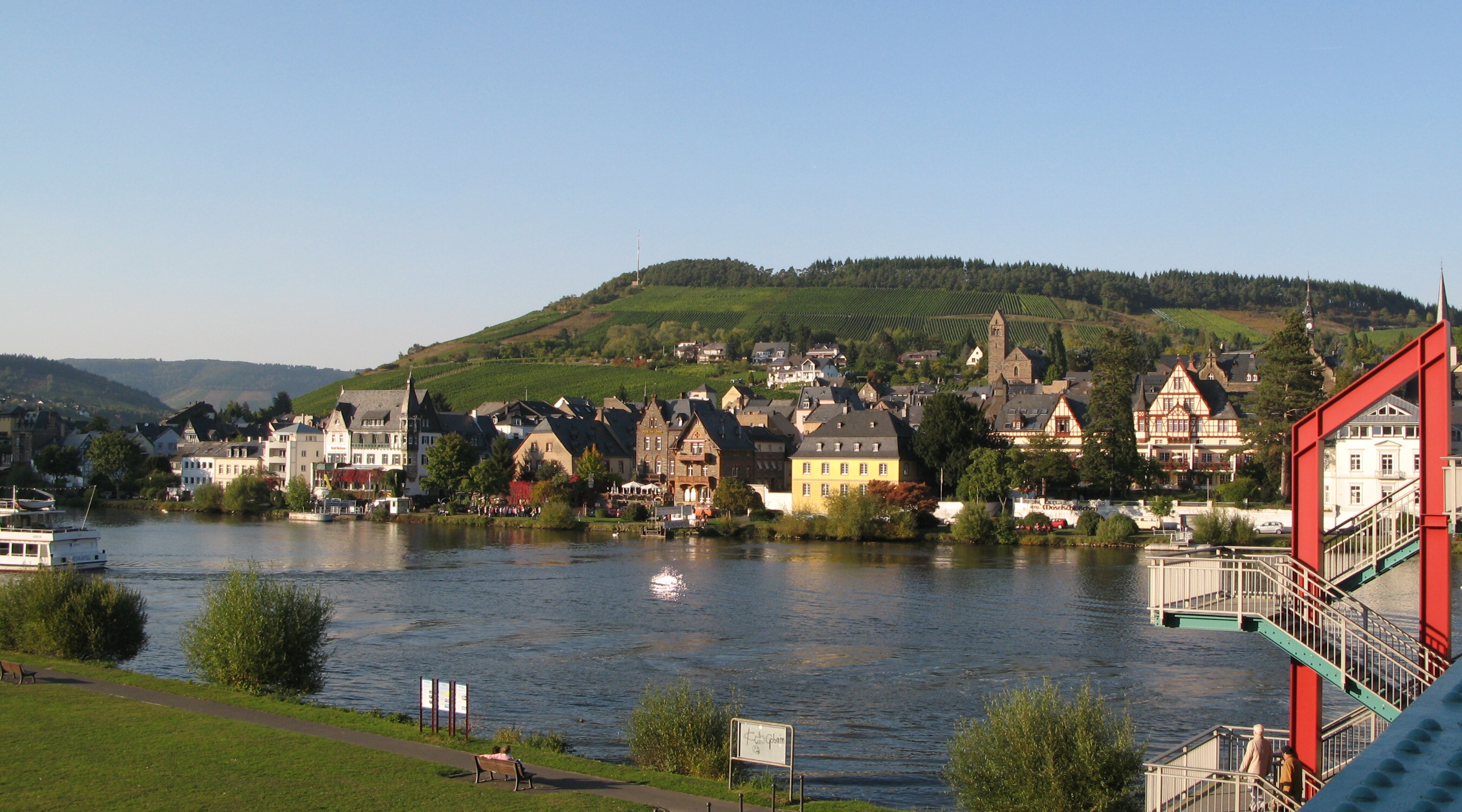
View of Traben from the bridge to Trarbach

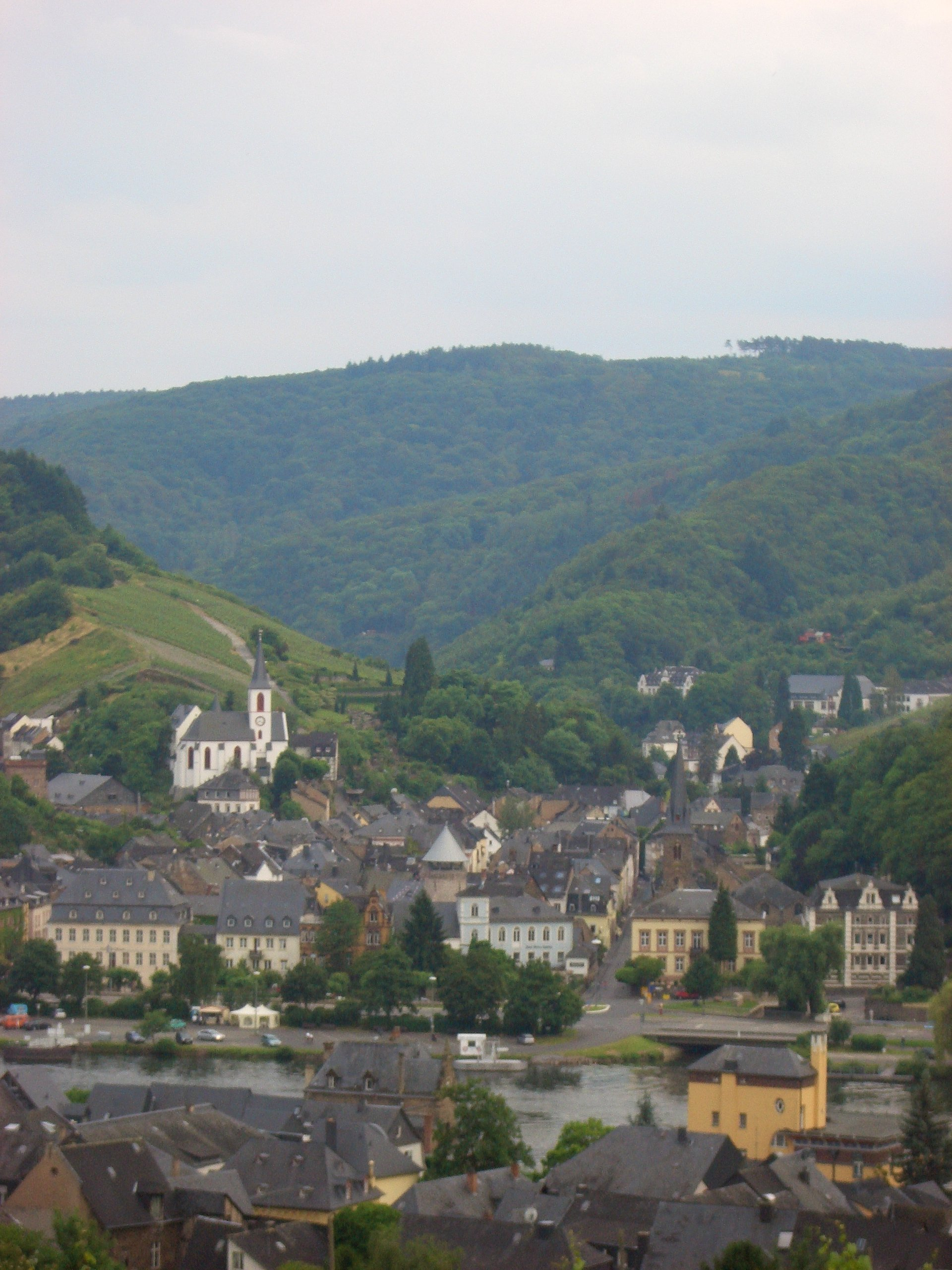
View of Trarbach on the Moselle's right bank

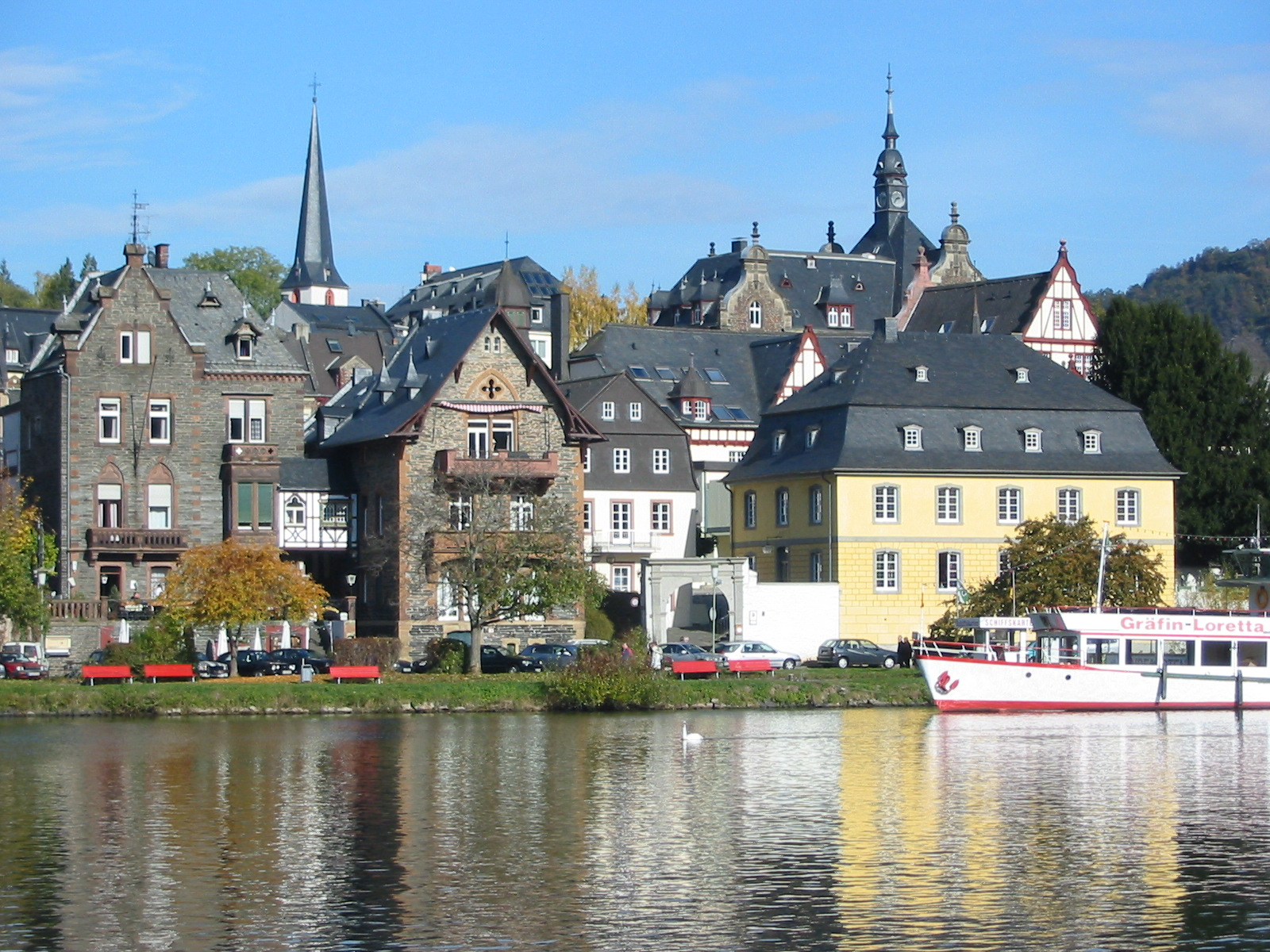
View from the landing stage

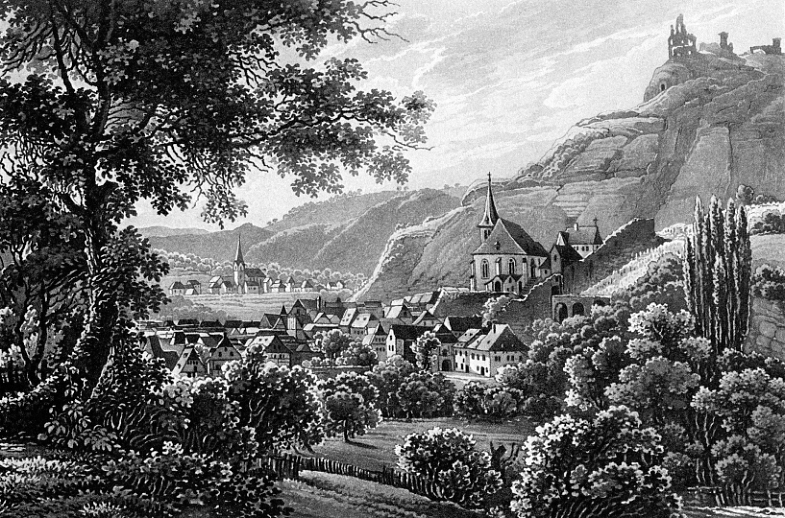
The town of Traben-Trarbach and the Grevenburg on the Moselle. Aquatint by Karl Bodmer 1841.

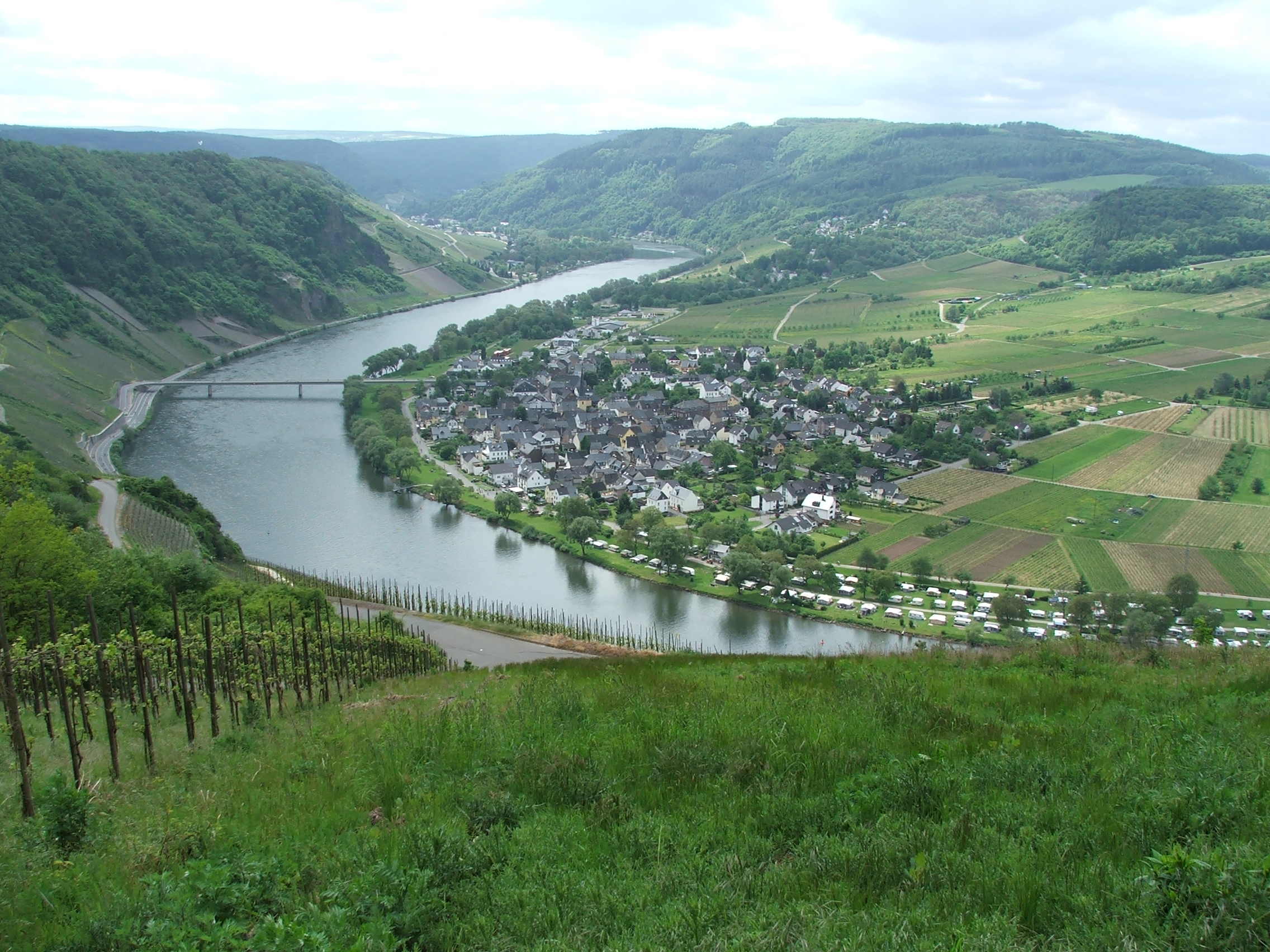
Outlying centre of Wolf

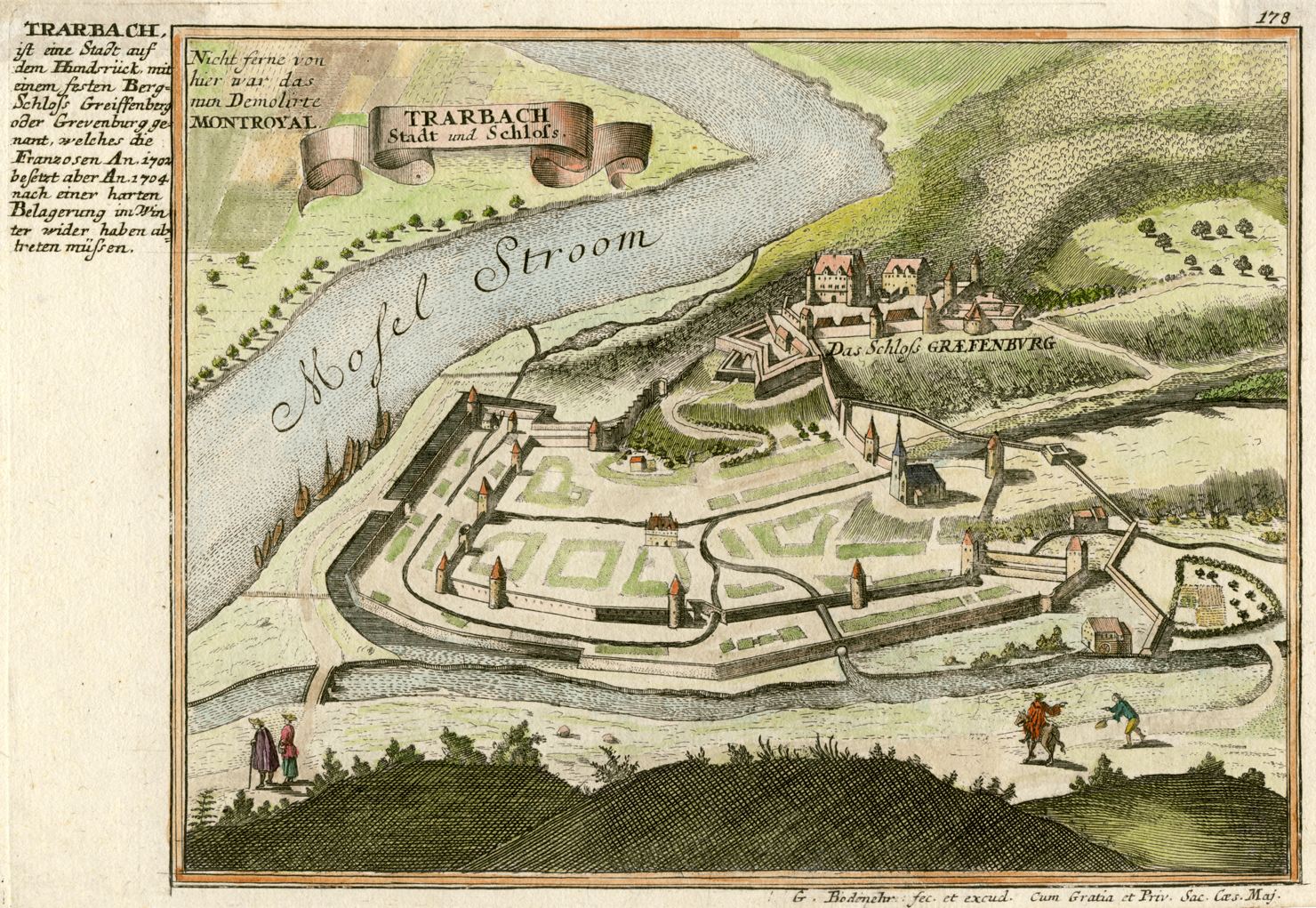
Trarbach – town and palace. Copper engraving by G. Bodenehr 1704.

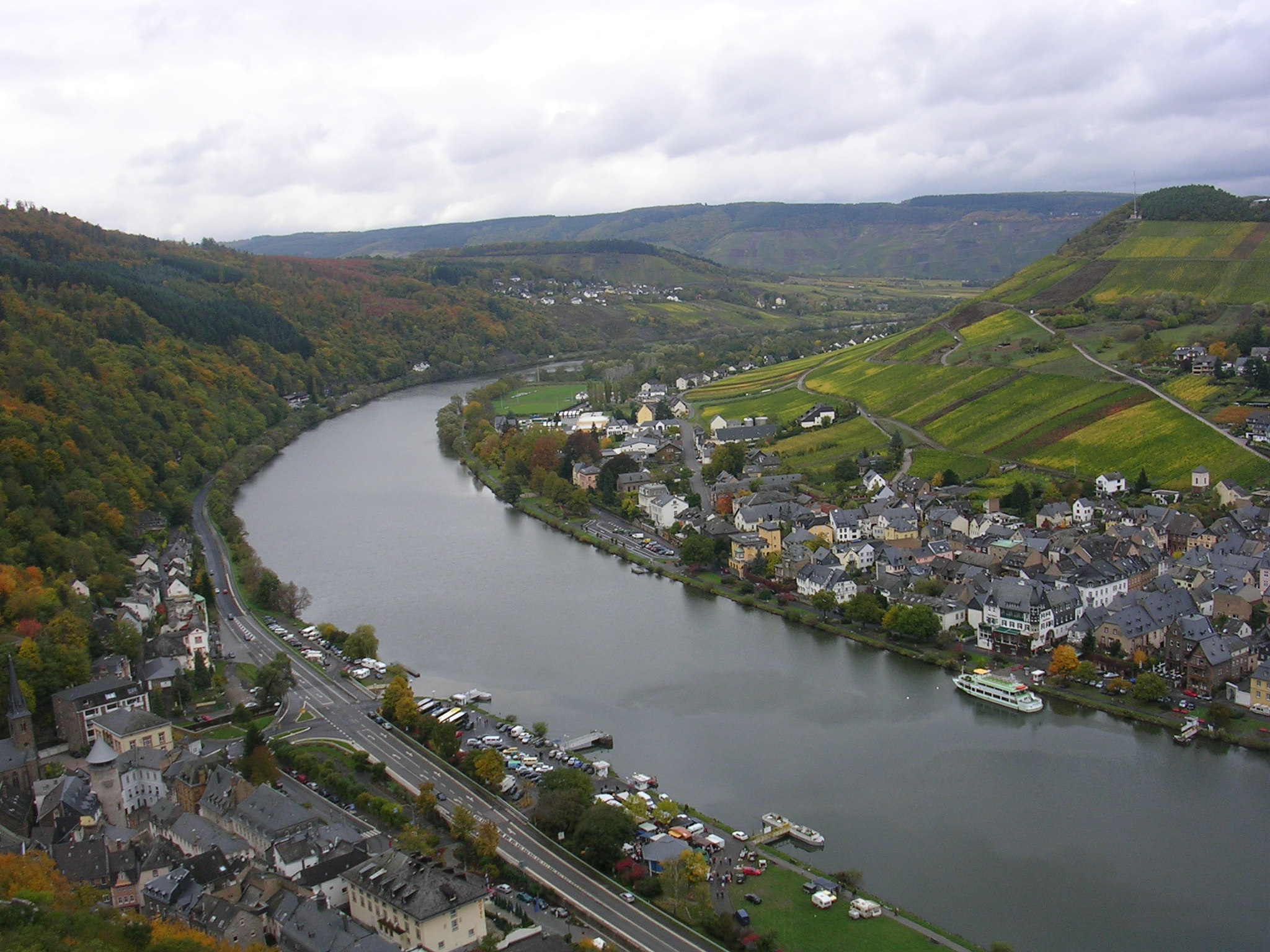

== Famous people ==
- Werner Beumelburg (1899–1963), one of the best known authors of National Socialist times, honorary citizen of Traben-Trarbach
- Stefan Bockelmann (b. 1976), actor (Unter uns)
- Heinrich Böcking (1785–1865), mining adviser and mayor in Saarbrücken
- Eduard Boecking (1802–1870), law professor in Bonn and Berlin (Roman civil law; translation of Ausonius's Mosella)
- Yvonne Burbach (b. 1975), actress (Verbotene Liebe)
- Nikolaus Elffen (1626–1706), Jesuit from Protestant Traben (panis coeli)
- Hans-Willi Ellermeier, sportsman, waterskier, German champion in slalom 1967, 1973, 1974, 1975, 1980, 1981
- Oliver Lucas (b. 1966), sportsman, motorboat racer, twice world and four times European champion
- Jost Maurer (fl. 1498, 1518), German mason, architect and construction entrepreneur
- Marc Mitscher (1887–1947), US admiral, grandson of Andreas Mitscher (1821–1905) from Traben
- Martin Molz (b. 1971), former professional footballer (1. FC Nürnberg and 1. FC Saarbrücken)
- Pete Namlook (1960–2012), ambient and electronic-music producer and composer, and founder of Fax Records (FAX +49-69/450464) music label
- Paul Emanuel Spieker (1826–1896), German architect (Berlin University Library)
- Philipp Adam Storck (1778–1822), teacher, 1810 principal of the trade school in Hagen, from 1817 professor in Bremen (Perspectives on the Free Hanseatic City of Bremen)
- Johann von Trarbach, Renaissance sculptor
- Dennis Wheatley (1897–1977), novelist, lived in Trarbach and worked at the Julius Kayser Winery in 1913
- Maik Zirbes (b. 1990), professional basketball player (KK Crvena Zvezda)
