= County of Sponheim =

State of the Holy Roman Empire (1000s–1804)

County of Sponheim Grafschaft Sponheim (German)
- 11th century – 1804
- Coat of arms of Upper Sponheim

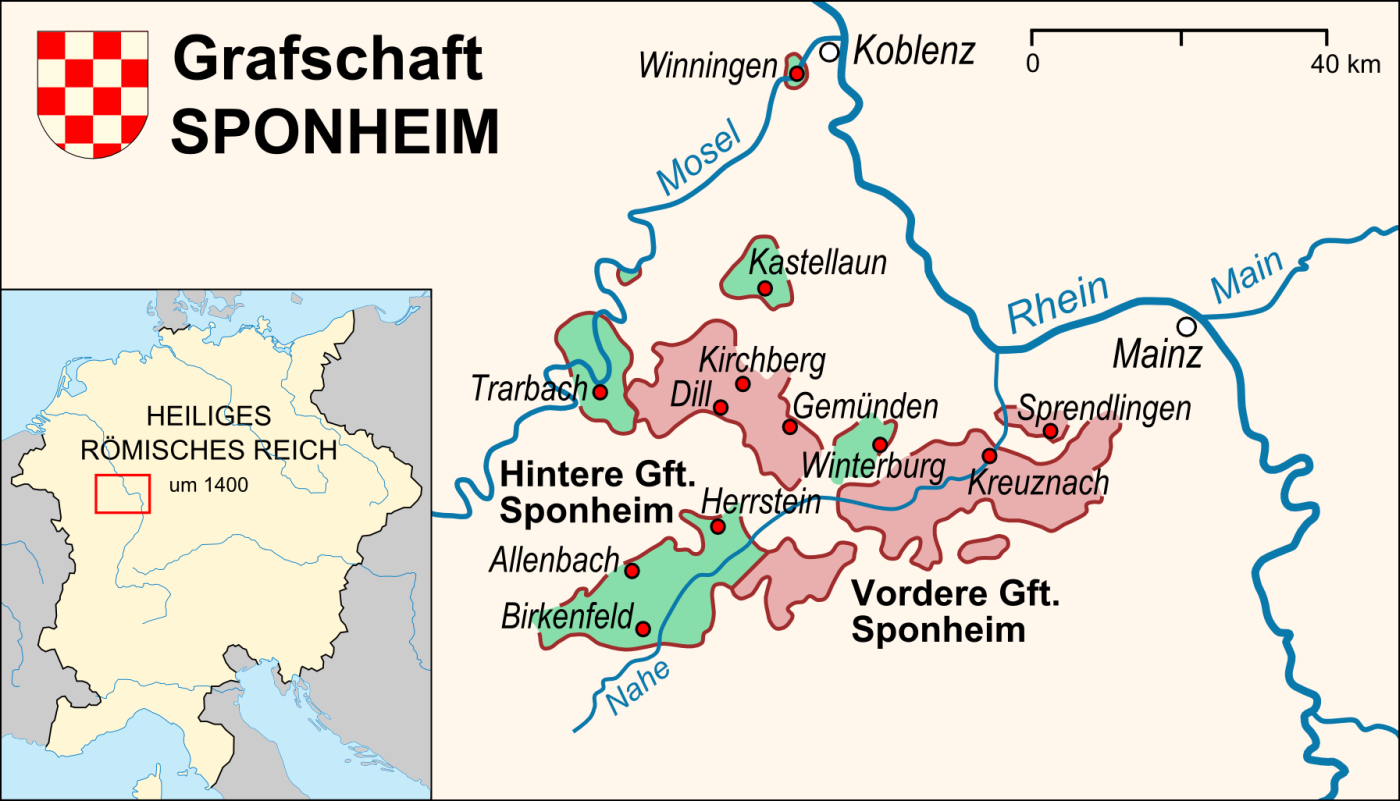
- Location of the County of Sponheim
- Status: State of the Holy Roman Empire
- Capital: Sponheim; Traben-Trarbach; Kreuznach
- Government: Feudal County
- Historical era: Middle Ages
  - Established: 11th century
  - Partitioned to Starkenburg and Kreuznach: c. 1225
  - Divided between Baden, Palatinate-Simmern-Zweibrücken-Birkenfeld and the Electoral Palatinate: 1437
  - Joined Upper Rhenish Imperial Circle: 1500
  - Annexed by the First French Empire: 1804
Preceded by
Argent, a chief indented gules (the Franconian Rake)	Rhenish Franconia
Or a bend gules, three alerions argent	Duchy of Lorraine
Succeeded by
Kingdom of Prussia
Grand Duchy of Oldenburg
Kingdom of Bavaria

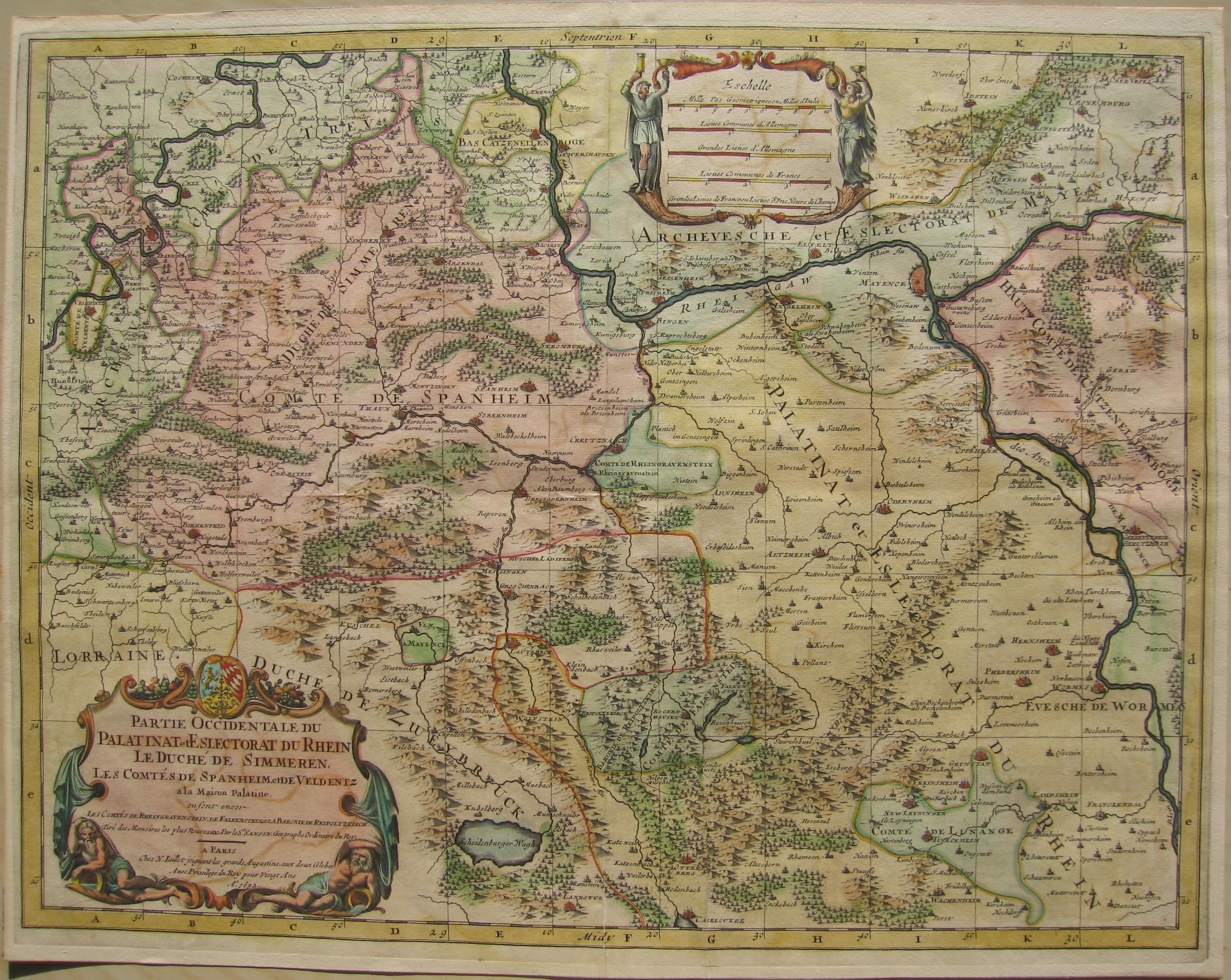
Historic map of the left bank of the Rhine in 1692 - including the County of Sponheim

The County of Sponheim (German: Grafschaft Sponheim, former spelling: Spanheim, Spanheym) was an independent territory in the Holy Roman Empire that lasted from the 11th century until the early 19th century. The name comes from the municipality of Sponheim, where the counts had their original residence.

== Geography ==
The territory was located roughly between the rivers Rhine, Moselle, and Nahe, in the present state of Rhineland-Palatinate, around the Hunsrück region. It bordered the Electorate of Trier to the north and west, the Raugraviate, the Electorate of Mainz and the Electorate of the Palatinate to the east and the County of Veldenz to the south and west, among other states.

== History ==
=== Beginnings ===
The family of Sponheim, or Spanheim (German: Spanheimer), has been documented since the 11th century. There are two main branches which are certainly related, but whose exact relationship is still debated. The branch of the Dukes of Carinthia descends from Siegfried I, Count of Sponheim. The Rhenish branch, which retained the County of Sponheim, descends from Stephan I, Count of Sponheim.

The county originated from various inheritances which were united in the family's hands, including possessions from the Counties of Nellenburg and Stromberg and jurisdiction of the Gaugrafen of Trechirgau (Berthold-Bezelin dynasty). The Sponheim comital office is supposedly derived from the comital office of Trechirgau. The family of the Counts of Sponheim founded the monastery of Sponheim in the 12th century, where in the 11th century a church had already been built. The Benedictine abbot from Sponheim, Johannes Trithemius, chronicled the counts of Sponheim and accumulated a large collection of documents on the history of the area.

=== First divisions, Upper and Lower Counties, 13th to 15th centuries ===
Coat of arms of Lower Sponheim

Around 1225, the county was divided in two, with each portion ruled by a different branch of the House of Sponheim. The Sponheim-Starkenburg line ruled over the Upper, Hither, or Farther County of Sponheim (Hintere Grafschaft Sponheim), based on Starkenburg, and the Sponheim-Kreuznach line over the Lower, Anterior, or Fore County of Sponheim (Vordere Grafschaft Sponheim), based on Kreuznach.

This partition took place among the sons of Count Gottfried III of Sponheim, who died abroad while participating in the Fifth Crusade. Gottfried had married Adelheid, sister of Count Henry III of Sayn. His estate was divided between their three sons John I, Henry, and Simon I. Simon, the youngest brother, received the Lower County of Sponheim and took up his residence in the castle of Kauzenburg near Kreuznach. Henry married the heiress of Heinsberg, received a portion of the Sayn inheritance, and founded the Sponheim line of the lords of Heinsberg. John became heir to Sayn and to the Upper County of Sponheim, residing first in Starkenburg Castle, and from 1350 at Grevenburg castle at Trarbach.

John I's sons divided their father's estate in 1265. Gottfried received the County of Sayn, whose direct heirs are today the counts of Sayn-Wittgenstein. Henry I, Count of Sponheim-Starkenburg became heir to the Upper County of Sponheim.

Both territories were extensively fortified throughout the centuries, as evidenced by the existence of around 21 castles or castle ruins, many of which can still be visited today. (Note: The County of Sponheim included throughout its history the following fortifications: Allenbach, Alt-Wolfstein, Argenschwang, Birkenfeld, Böckelheim, Dill, Tannenfels, Ebernburg, Frauenburg, Gemünden/Hunsrück, Grafendahn, Grevenburg, Gutenberg, Herrstein, Kastellaun, Koppenstein, Kreuznach, Naumburg, Sponheim, Starkenburg, Winterburg, Zollburg) Feuds with the neighbouring Electorates of Mainz and Trier were common, giving birth to southwestern German legends such as the tale of Michel Mort. The Upper and Lower Counties were also not always on good terms with each other regarding political affiliation. During the dispute between the German kings Frederick the Fair and Louis the Bavarian, the Upper County supported Louis, while Lower Sponheim advocated for Frederick. Louis's victory resulted in political strengthening of Upper Sponheim. Around that time, the Lower County had itself been administratively divided between the brothers John II of Sponheim-Kreuznach and Simon II of Sponheim-Kreuznach, with Soonwald forest defining the boundary. Count Walram of Sponheim-Kreuznach reunited the Lower County. Walram became known as an active military leader involved in many actions, including inter-Sponheim ones.

=== Second divisions and joint regency ===
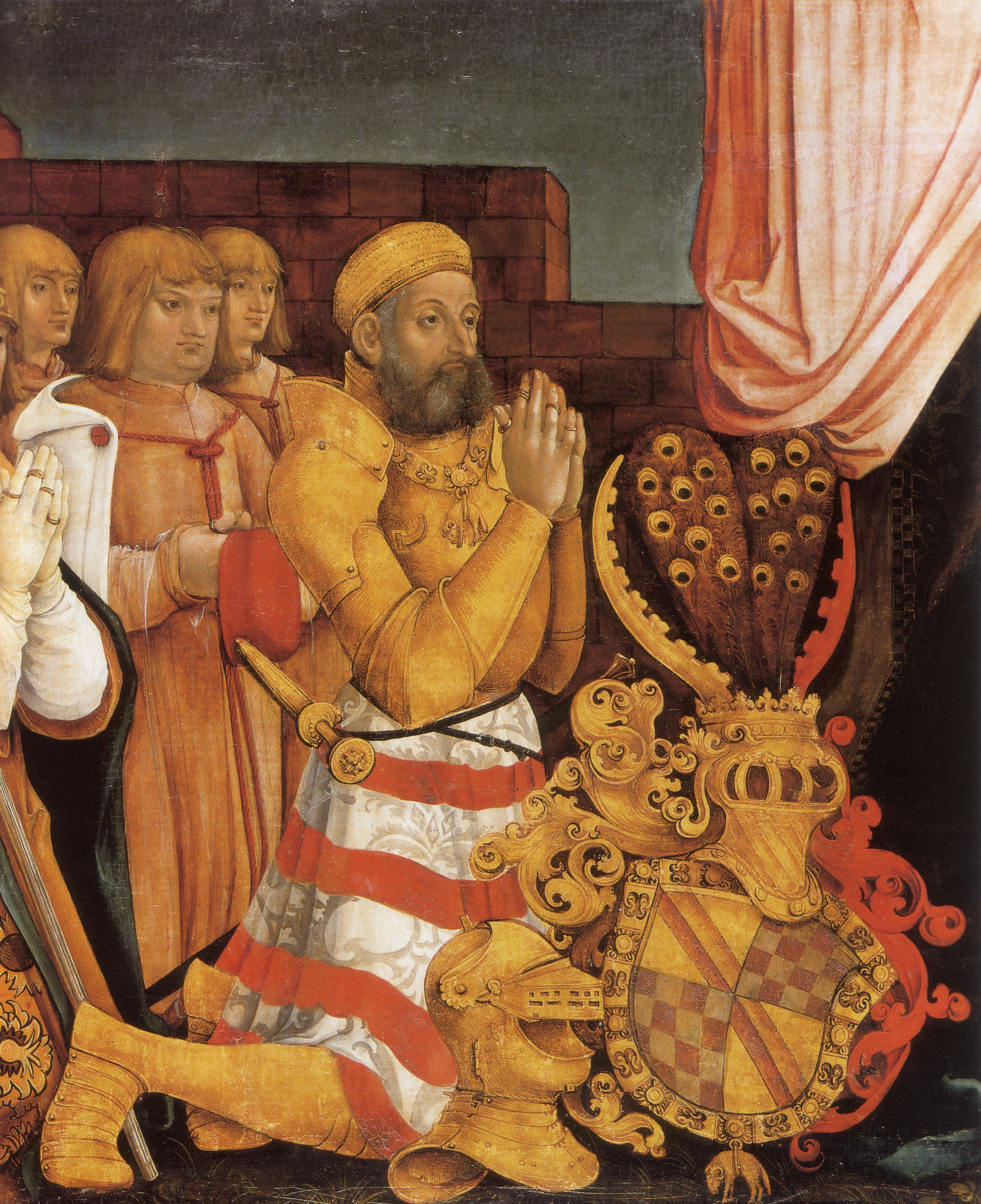
Christopher I, Margrave of Baden-Baden, joint ruler 1475–1515

In 1417, the Sponheim-Kreuznach line became extinct and the Sponheim-Starkenburg line ruled alone for about 20 years over most of the whole county. Count Walram's granddaughter married Ruprecht Pipan, heir to the Electorate of the Palatinate, who died of disease after returning from the Battle of Nicopolis at the age of 21. The marriage was childless, but nevertheless a small portion of the Lower County (less than 1/5) was granted as dowry to the Electors Palatine. In 1437 the Sponheim-Starkenburg family became extinct in the male line, and the counties were jointly ruled as a condominium by female-line heirs from then until the early 19th century. These rightful successors, who took the title of count at Sponheim (Graf zu Sponheim), were the margraves of Baden, who descended from Mechtild of Sponheim, and the counts of Veldenz, who descended from Loretta of Sponheim; both Mechtild and Loretta were daughters of Count John III of Sponheim-Starkenburg. The County of Veldenz was soon inherited by a collateral line of the Counts Palatine of the Rhine through the union of the heiress Anna of Veldenz with Stephen, Count Palatine of Simmern-Zweibrücken. The rule of the Upper County of Sponheim was thus shared between Baden and Palatinate-Simmern-Zweibrücken or Palatinate-Birkenfeld; the rule of the Lower County of Sponheim roughly between Baden and the Electorate of the Palatinate.

=== Reformation ===
The Reformation was instituted in the County of Sponheim in the year 1557, led by Friedrich II, Count Palatine of Simmern. The county became an important outpost of Protestant territory, with exclaves on the Moselle such as Enkirch, Trarbach, or Winningen, bordering as it did the Catholic Electorate of Trier. Warfare with neighbouring Catholic states would take place intermittently through the centuries, notably including the Thirty Years' War.

=== End of the county ===
After the Napoleonic Wars, most of the county became a part of Prussia, (Note: Grand Duchy of the Lower Rhine until 1822, then Rhine Province) and the region around Birkenfeld became part of Oldenburg (as the Principality of Birkenfeld). Some small formerly-Sponheim-areas became parts of Saxe-Coburg-Saalfeld (the Principality of Lichtenberg; from 1826 part of Saxe-Coburg and Gotha) and Hesse-Homburg; these areas passed to Prussia in 1834 and 1866 respectively. The ruling dynasties of Baden and Wittelsbach received extensive territories in exchange for the loss of Sponheim (compare also literature on the so-called "Sponheim Controversy" between Baden and Bavaria).

== See also ==
- List of Counts at Sponheim
- Margraviate of Baden
- Friedrich Karl von Tettenborn
