= Oberamt Meisenheim =

Administrative subdivision in Germany

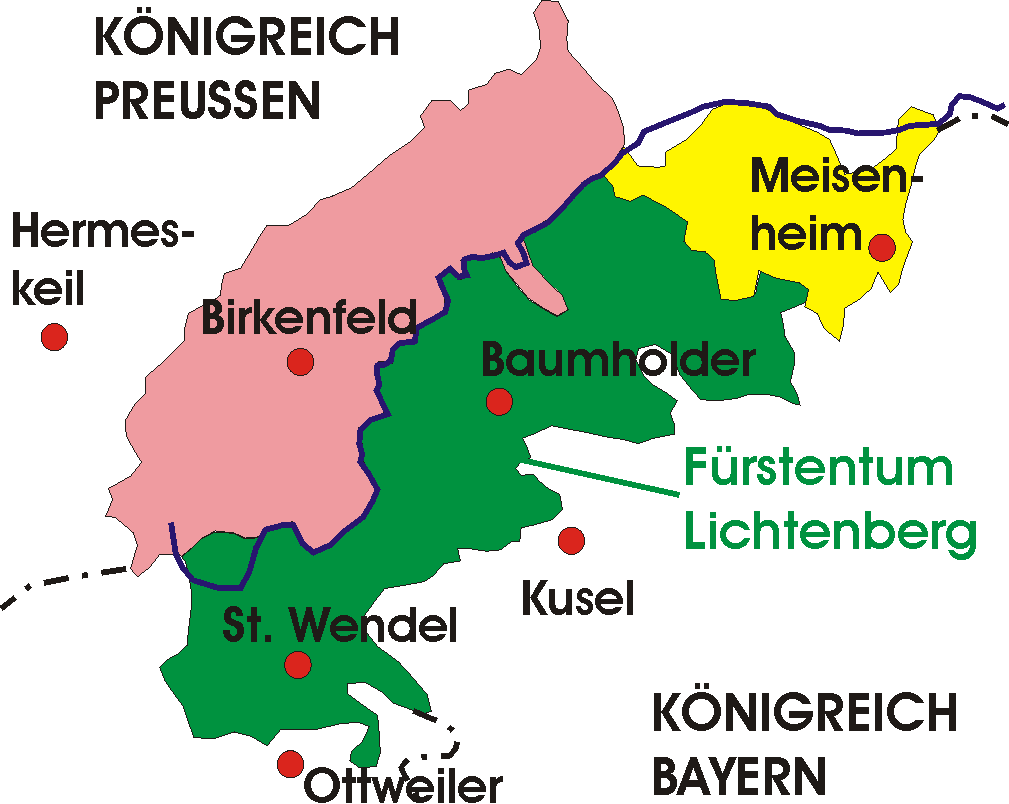
Oberamt Meisenheim (yellow)

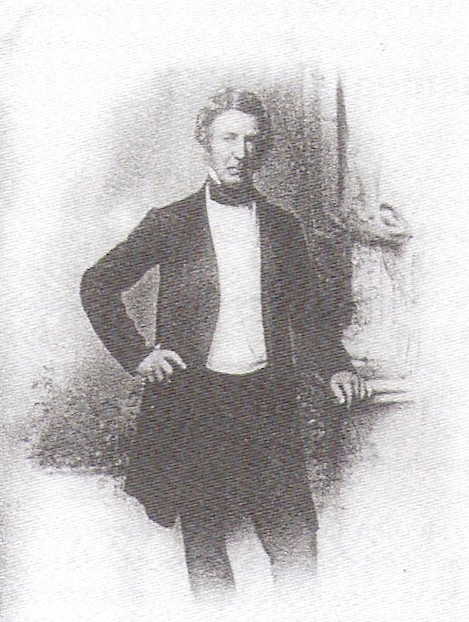
Councillor Johann Georg Martin Reinhardt

The Oberamt Meisenheim, also known as the Lordship of Meisenheim (Herrschaft Meisenheim) was an administrative subdivision and exclave of Hesse-Homburg centred on the city of Meisenheim, from 1816 to 1866. Today, the territory belongs to Rheinland-Pfalz.

== History ==
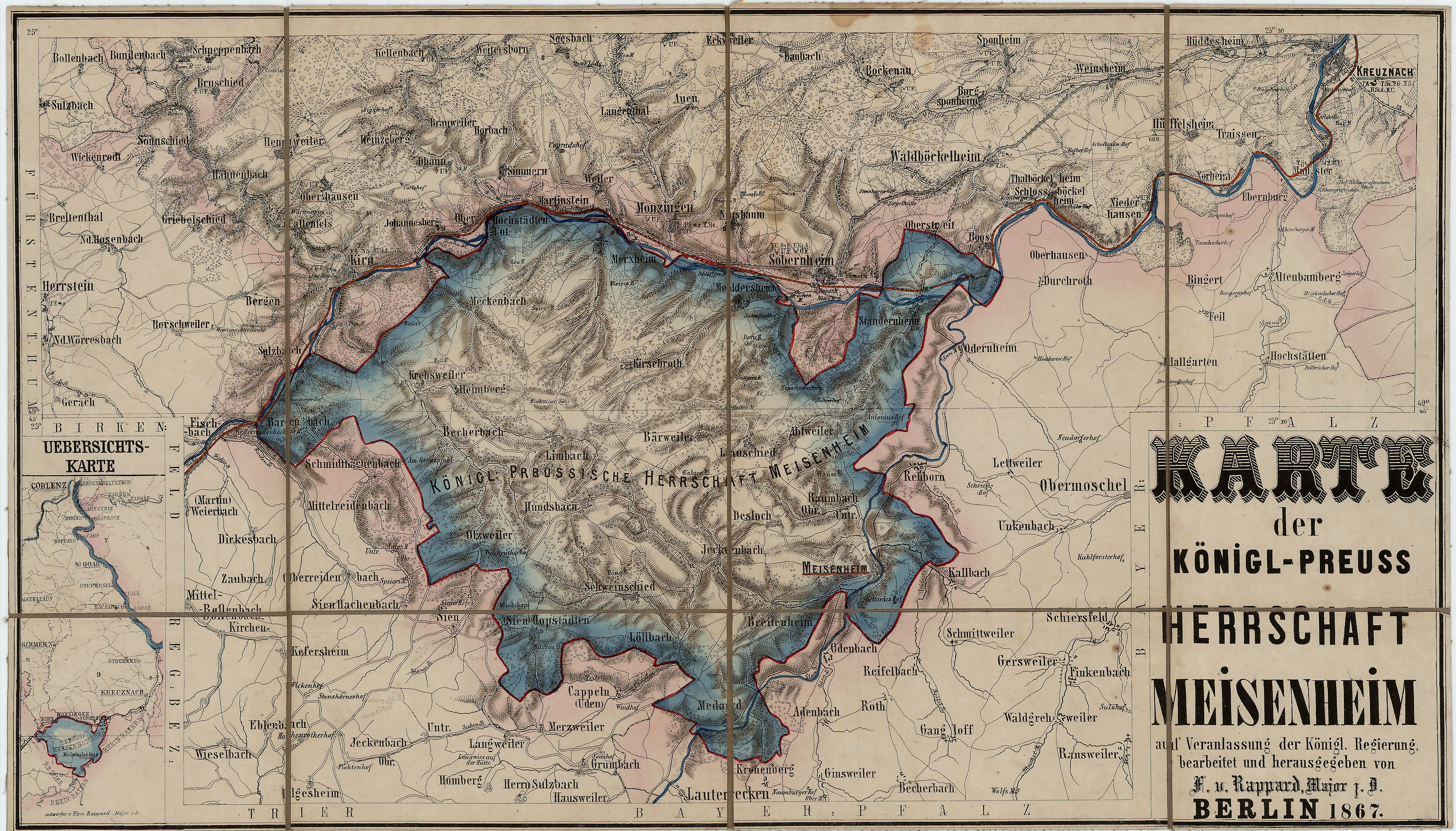
Map of the Lordship of Meisenheim in 1867

The area which would become the Oberamt Meisenheim was under the control of various sovereigns before the Napoleonic Wars. The Oberamt Meisenheim in the principality of Palatine Zweibrücken before 1798 covered a somewhat different area than the Obaramt discussed in this article.

In 1794, the Left Bank of the Rhine was captured by France during the War of the First Coalition and it became part of the French Republic in 1798. Until 1815, Meisenheim was part of the Arrondissement de Birkenfeld in the Sarre department. Under Article 49 of acts of the Congress of Vienna of 9 June 1815, a district in the former Sarre department with a population of 69,000 was reserved for several sovereigns. An section of it with a population of 10,000 was reserved for Hesse-Homburg. The area was placed under the temporary control of the Kingdom of Prussia and finally handed over to Frederick V, Landgrave of Hesse-Homburg on 9 September 1816. It encompassed the whole of the former French Canton of Meisenheim and four districts of the Canton of Grumbach.

It was a bit of a curiosity. The Landgraviate of Hesse-Homburg consisted solely of the ancestral territory around Homburg vor der Höhe, known as the Amt Homburg or "Lordship of Homburg", and the distant exclave of Meisenheim. Originally, Hesse-Homburg hand hoped to grow at the expense of one of its near-neighbours (perhaps Oberursel or Rosbach vor der Höhe and when Frederick V found out that he would be receiving Meisenheim, he is said to have said, "what am I meant to do with this district in China?" The Oberamt had an area of 176 km^{2}, making it larger than the whole Amt Homburg. In addition, it used a different code of laws, since Meisenheim had adopted the Napoleonic Code, while Homburg continued to employ its own laws . There were no cultural, economic, or historical links between the two territories.

Toll barriers posed a particular issue for Meisenheim. Owing to the small size of the Oberamt, most of its trade withneighbouring communities involved crossing national borders. Particularly pressing was the duty on salt, which all came from the neighbouring town of Bad Münster.

The July Revolution of 1830 in France sparked protests in Meisenheim. The protestors supported an end to the toll barriers. The town council under mayor Bonnet restored calm, but on 29 April 1832 disorder broke out once more. The toll barriers and the low quality of salt prompted a serious riot, led by the brush-maker Carl Kloninger. On 20 May, the unrest continued and Bonnet had to establish citizen militia. In Homburg, these measures were not considered sufficient, so Johann Georg Martin Reinhardt was dispatched to be administrative head of the Oberamt. He restored order with harsh measures and banned the German Press and Fatherland Association on 27 October 1832.

In 1834, Homburg entered the customs zone of the Grand Duchy of Hesse as part of the Zollverein, while the Oberamt Meisenheim joined the Prussian customs zone. On 24 March 1866, Hesse-Homburg passed briefly to the Grand Duchy of Hesse following the death of the last Landgrave of Hesse-Homburg and then passed to Prussia later that year, following Hesse's defeat in the Austro-Prussian War. This annexation was formalised by a Prussian law on 24 December 1866 and a patent of annexation on 12 January 1867.

== Politics ==
Although there was no separation of judiciary and administration in the landgraviate of Hesse-Homburg, there was nevertheless a division of the roles at the top level of the Oberamt Meisenheim. The top position of the Oberamt was an administrative official, called the 1. Beamter or Oberamtmann. Alongside him was a judicial official, called the 2. Beamter. It was common for the 2. Beamter to be promoted to 1. Beamter, when the latter position fell vacant.

Administrative officials/1. Beamter:

- 1817–1826: Friedrich Wilhelm Cramer
- 1826–1830: Franz Carl
- 1830–1832: Friedrich Wernigk
- 1832–1848 and 1849–1866: Johann Georg Martin Reinhardt

Judicial officials/2. Beamter:

- 1818–1826: Franz Carl
- 1826–1830: Friedrich Wernigk
- 1830–1832: Johann Georg Martin Reinhardt
- (1832) 1834–1846: Heinrich Sundheimer
- 1846–1858: Karl Anthes
- 1858–1855: Friedrich Linn

From 1832 until 1872, Johann Georg Martin Reinhardt was head of administration, either as Oberamtmann or as Regional Councillor (Landrat), with the exception of a short period between 6 April 1848 and 1849 when he was expelled from office as a result of the March Revolution. During that period, Christian Bansa was head of the administration.

The judicial system was a successor of the Civil Court of Meisenheim, which served as a court of first instance in the Left Rhine legal system during the French occupation. There was a right of appeal to the first deputation of the government of the Landgraviate of Hesse-Homburg and a final appeal to the Darmstadt Superior Court of Appeal.

After the Landtag (parliament) of Hesse-Homburg was conclusively abolished in 1852, a district council was established in 1853 for the Oberamt. The members were partially elected and partially appointed by the landgraves. Four representatives of the Oberamt, together with four representatives of the Amt Homburg, formed the national committee of the landgraviate.

On 2 February 1867, following the Prussian annexation, the Oberamt Meisenheim was merged into the Koblenz Regierungsbezirk and later became the Kreis Meisenheim. The judicial system of Meisenhem was abolished and replaced with a civil court of Meisenheim analogous to the other courts of Rhine province. In 1878, it was transformed into the District Court of Meisenheim.

== Districts ==
The Oberamt of Meisenheim consisted of 25 districts, arranged into four "mayoralties" (Oberschultheißereien:

District	Mayoralty	Owner before 1794	Owner 1798–1814	Today
Abtweiler	Meisenheim	Baron of Hunolstein	Kanton Meisenheim	VG Meisenheim
Bärenbach	Becherbach	Margrave of Baden	Kanton Grumbach	VG Kirner Land
Bärweiler	Merxheim	Prince of Salm-Kyrburg	Kanton Meisenheim	VG Nahe-Glan
Becherbach	Becherbach	Margrave of Baden	Kanton Grumbach	VG Kirner Land
Breitenheim	Meisenheim	Duke of Zweibrücken	Kanton Meisenheim	VG Meisenheim
Desloch	Meisenheim	Duke of Zweibrücken	Kanton Meisenheim	VG Meisenheim
Jeckenbach	Meisenheim	Duke of Zweibrücken	Kanton Meisenheim	VG Meisenheim
Heimberg (Heimweiler)	Becherbach	Margrave of Baden	Kanton Meisenheim	VG Kirner Land
Hochstädten (Hochstetten-Dhaun)	Merxheim	Prince of Salm-Kyrburg	Kanton Meisenheim	VG Kirner Land
Hoppstädten	Becherbach	Rhinegrave of Grumbach	Kanton Grumbach	VG Lauterecken-Wolfstein
Hundsbach	Becherbach	Baron of Boos	Kanton Meisenheim	VG Meisenheim
Kirschroth	Meddersheim	Prince of Salm-Kyrburg and others	Kanton Meisenheim	VG Nahe-Glan
Krebsweiler (Heimweiler)	Becherbach	Margrave of Baden	Kanton Meisenheim	VG Kirner Land
Lauschied	Meisenheim	Baron of Boos and others	Kanton Meisenheim	VG Nahe-Glan
Limbach	Becherbach	Markgraf von Baden	Kanton Meisenheim	VG Kirner Land
Löllbach	Meisenheim	Prince of Salm-Kyrburg	Kanton Meisenheim	VG Meisenheim
Meckenbach	Merxheim	Prince of Salm-Kyrburg	Kanton Meisenheim	VG Meisenheim
Medart	Meisenheim	Duke of Zweibrücken	Kanton Meisenheim	VG Lauterecken-Wolfstein
Meddersheim	Meddersheim	Prince of Salm-Kyrburg and others	Kanton Meisenheim	VG Nahe-Glan
Meisenheim	Meisenheim	Duke of Zweibrücken	Kanton Meisenheim	VG Meisenheim
Merxheim	Merxheim	Baron of Hunolstein and others	Kanton Meisenheim	VG Nahe-Glan
Otzweiler	Becherbach	Prince of Salm-Kyrburg and others	Kanton Grumbach	VG Kirner Land
Raumbach	Meisenheim	Duke of Zweibrücken	Kanton Meisenheim	VG Meisenheim
Schweinschied	Meisenheim	Prince of Salm-Kyrburg	Kanton Meisenheim	VG Meisenheim
Staudernheim	Meddersheim	Prince of Salm-Kyrburg and others	Kanton Meisenheim	VG Nahe-Glan

== Bibliography ==
- Johann Georg Martin Reinhardt; Otto Beck: Beschreibung des Oberamts Meisenheim. Meisenheim 1868. Online
- Karl Baumgart: Das Oberamt Meisenheim im Vormärz. Meisenheimer Hefte Nr. 40, 2000
- Thomas Klein: Band 11: Hessen-Nassau, in Walther Hubatsch: Grundriß zur deutschen Verwaltungsgeschichte 1815–1945. 1979, ISBN 3-87969-126-6, pp. 232–234.
- Max Bär: Die Behördenverfassung der Rheinprovinz, 1919, Nachdruck 1965, pp. 107–111
