= Meisenheim (Verbandsgemeinde) =

Municipality in Rhineland-Palatinate, Germany

Coordinates: 49.707°N 7.667°E

Meisenheim is a former Verbandsgemeinde ("collective municipality") in the district of Bad Kreuznach, Rhineland-Palatinate, Germany. The seat of the Verbandsgemeinde was in Meisenheim. On 1 January 2020 it was merged into the new Verbandsgemeinde Nahe-Glan.

The Verbandsgemeinde Meisenheim consisted of the following Ortsgemeinden ("local municipalities"):

1. Abtweiler
2. Becherbach
3. Breitenheim
4. Callbach
5. Desloch
6. Hundsbach
7. Jeckenbach
8. Lettweiler
9. Löllbach
10. Meisenheim
11. Raumbach
12. Rehborn
13. Reiffelbach
14. Schmittweiler
15. Schweinschied
