= Bärweiler =

- Municipality
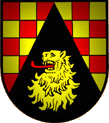
- Coat of arms

- Location of Bärweiler within Bad Kreuznach district
- Interactive map of Bärweiler
- Location within Germany Location within Rhineland-Palatinate
- Coordinates: 49°44′33″N 7°36′4″E
- Country: Germany
- State: Rhineland-Palatinate
- District: Bad Kreuznach
- Municipal assoc.: Nahe-Glan

Government
  - Mayor (2019–24): Helmut Schmell

Area
  - Total: 6.11 km^{2} (2.36 sq mi)
- Elevation: 288 m (945 ft)

Population (2025-12-31)
  - Total: 201
  - Density: 32.9/km^{2} (85.2/sq mi)
- Time zone: UTC+01:00 (CET)
  - Summer (DST): UTC+02:00 (CEST)
- Postal codes: 55606
- Dialling codes: 06751
- Vehicle registration: KH
- Website: www.baerweiler.de

Bärweiler is an Ortsgemeinde – a municipality belonging to a Verbandsgemeinde, a kind of collective municipality – in the Bad Kreuznach district in Rhineland-Palatinate, Germany. It belongs to the Verbandsgemeinde Nahe-Glan, whose seat is in Bad Sobernheim.

== Geography ==
=== Location ===
Bärweiler lies in picturesque hilly land between Bad Sobernheim and Meisenheim. The residential community characterized by agriculture has a municipal area measuring 611 ha (1,510 acres). The municipality lies 10 km (6 mi) from Bad Sobernheim, 13 km (8 mi) from Kirn, 10 km (6 mi) from Meisenheim and roughly 30 km (19 mi) from the district seat, Bad Kreuznach. The village, which lies south of the Nahe, belongs to the northernmost part of the Saar-Nahe Uplands and Hills, more precisely to the Sien-Lauschied Ridge in the Meisenheim Uplands (Glan-Alsenz Mountains). Because of the lively breaking-up of the landscape into scattered, wooded hillocks and ridges, hollows and open plateau remnants, the countryside is also described as “humpy land”. The highest elevation in the municipality reaches 393.0 m above sea level, while the lowest point is 225.3 m above sea level.

=== Land use ===
Bärweiler's 611 ha (1,510 acres) of land breaks down in terms of use as follows:

- Built-up land: 9 ha (22 acres)
- Streets and paths: 25.6 ha (63 acres)
- Wooded land: 100 ha (250 acres)
- Agriculture: 465 ha (1,150 acres)
- Open water: 2.2 ha (5.4 acres)
- Wasteland and other: 9.2 ha (23 acres)

=== Neighbouring municipalities ===
Clockwise from the north, Bärweiler's neighbours are the municipality of Meddersheim, the municipality of Lauschied, the municipality of Jeckenbach, the municipality of Hundsbach and the municipality of Kirschroth.

=== Constituent communities ===
Also belonging to Bärweiler is the outlying homestead of Hottenmühle.

== History ==
=== 13th and 14th centuries ===
On 14 March 1283, Waldgraves Emich von der Kyrburg, Konrad and Gottfried Raub's father, and Gottfried von Dhaun undertook a division of their landholds in Flonheim, Monzingen, Hausen near Rhaunen and other places. Named in this deal were, among other things, an estate at Hausen and holdings in the villages of Buntenbach (Bundenbach), Blickersaue (Blickersau – now vanished) and Wapenroth (Woppenroth). The people on the estate at Hausen who were from outside the village were to be divided by the road that ran from Meisenheim to the Langenstein (near Bärweiler), then to Hostede (Hochstätten), and thence by the road Veldencia (Veldenz) by way of Runa (Rhaunen), on by the old mill to Lauferswilre (Laufersweiler) and Enckerich (Enkirch). Everybody who lived east of this road, on towards the Rhine, was to be assigned to Waldgrave Emich, whereas everybody who lived west thereof, on towards the forests, was to be assigned to Waldgrave Gottfried. On 6 December 1363, Bärweiler had its first documentary mention in an agreement that was reached on that day: Waldgrave Friedrich von Kyrburg was to allow the knights Johann Fust, Lamprecht and Conrad, Brothers of Stromberg, the rental rights that had been sold them, after four years had gone by. The rights were herein bound to fiefs at Berwilre (Bärweiler). The requirement was that the persons named would have paid up to that point 220 tornesels (silver Groschen). If they could not pay off the corn rental rights within four years, then the knights Henrich and Rudwin, along with Siegfried, Brothers of Stromberg, or their feudal heirs or Lords Konrad and Emrich (also knights), Brothers of Mirksheim (Merxheim) could do so. On 14 February 1375, Thilman, Lord at Heyntzenberg (Heinzenberg), sold Otto, Waldgrave at Kirburg, and his wife Agnes many holdings, which were listed by name, in Lympach (Limbach), Berwilre (Bärweiler), Leylbach (Löllbach), Schwinscheit (Schweinschied), Seibach, Syende, Nieder-Meckenbach, Medersheym (Meddersheim), Meckenbach and Oberhondsbach among other places. From Bärweiler, a man named “Wilhelm von Berwilre” was mentioned. Even as far back as 1377, the Langenstein (a local menhir) was mentioned in a Weistum (cognate with English wisdom, this was a legal pronouncement issued by men learned in law in the Middle Ages and early modern times) dealing with the Kirner Marktmeile (“Kirn Market Mile”, actually a boundary description). The pertinent passage from the Weistum reads as follows (in archaic German):

Dis ist die martmyle und get an zu Oberhosenbach an dem cruze, und gein Wapenrot an den lichten bule, und vort gein Sessebach an die velse, von dort zu Viller an die Ruhe und vort gein Berwiller an den langen Stein, von dannen an Lympachs crutz und vort gein Perich an den hane…

In translation, this comes out as follows:

This is the market mile and (it) goes on to Oberhosenbach at the cross, and towards Woppenroth at the gentle rise, and forth towards Seesbach at the crag, from there to Weiler at the rest spot and forth towards Bärweiler at the Long Stone (that is, the menhir), from there to Limbach’s cross and forth towards Perich at the grove…

The Weistum only mentions the main points (among which Perich is a bit of a mystery) of the boundary of a zone within which high jurisdiction over robbers and murderers was subject to the Waldgraves as the landholders. In other words, they held the power to pronounce even the harshest sentences upon such wrongdoers. More precise clues as to the village of Bärweiler, however, are found only in the 14th century, although the village, and also its name, might well be quite a bit older. Bärweiler was a lordship that was the Kyrburg part of a joint holding (Ganerbenschaft) as a Waldgravial Burgmann’s fief. Among the knightly families, the Fauste von Stromberg and the Fauste von Merxheim were recorded, among others. On 19 April 1382, the brothers Johann and Brenner von Stromberg sold their share of the village, court and people at Berwilre with its appurtenances, whereby bit by bit their titles in Bärweiler would, by sale, one by one, pass back to the Waldgraves. According to the old Mannbuch (literally “man book”, a kind of register book of enfeoffments) in Coesfeld, Lamprecht Fuste von Stromberg held a claim on 24 Malter in corn (likely either wheat or rye) rent in Bärweiler.

=== 15th century ===
On 26 July 1412, Johann Waldgrave at Dunen (Dhaun) and at Kirburg gave Rorich von Merxheim a holding in pledge to free up 100 Rhenish guilders. Furthermore, the document established that the right to redeem the pledge existed for Brenner von Stromberg and Waldgrave Johann. Johann held the stronger hand. The pledged estates were thus Waldgrave Johann’s fief. The lordly dominium directum over three villages in the area of the Heidenweistum had from yore belonged to the Counts of Veldenz: Hundsbach, Merzweiler and Nieder-Eisenbach. According to the old Veldenz Mannbuch, Johann Boos von Waldeck held the following fiefs on 11 February 1417: his share of the Hundeszbach (Hundsbach) court, people, taxes (public-lawful levies), rental (general payment mainly from harvests) and whatever belonged thereto as well as a share in the freedom of action at Huntsbach (Hundsbach), Berwilre (Bärweiler), Merxheim, Mederszheim (Meddersheim) and Langenhard (vanished village of Langert near Bärweiler). On 21 April 1422, Johann and Philipp, Brothers Boos von Waldeck acquired as fiefs, among other things, once again Hondiszbach (Hundsbach), the village and the court, with the appertaining people, taxes, rental and freedom of action at Hondiszbach, Berwilre and other places. On 13 September 1426, an agreement was concluded with Brenner von Stromberg as to the village and the court at Berwilre with appurtenances. Lamprecht Fust von Stromberg on 13 May 1427 imposed a yearly corn rental of 24 Malter in Bärweiler as part of the Kyrburg fief that he held. On 9 February 1432, Hermann Boos von Waldeck appeared in another document. He arranged a widow’s fund for his wife Schonette von Sien of 10 Rhenish guilders from the fief that he held from Friedrich Count of Veldenz, among other things, in Hundsbach, at Luschet (Lauschied) and at Berwiler (Bärweiler) the people who were assigned to his Schultheiß, Fogler. On 7 July 1434, the yearly corn rental of 24 Malter went to Johann Fuste and on 27 December 1457, to Lamprecht Fuste von Stromberg as a pledged fief from the Lordship of Kyrburg. About 1460, Bärweiler was mentioned in the court and border Weistum dealing with the Heidengericht (“Heath Court”) at Sien or the state court in the Winterhauch (an upland south and southeast of Idar-Oberstein). The conspicuous Langenstein once again served as a border marker. To this day, border markings can still be found on the cliffs behind the village, if one climbs over the cliffs from the north over a little natural bridge. These 12 cm-in-diameter, 10 cm-deep markings have been wrongly interpreted as “basins” and associated with a sacrifice cult and similar phenomena. In fact, they are nothing more than 13th- and 14th-century border markers. They defined points on the border in the Middle Ages before the cross was introduced as a border sign.

=== 16th century ===
Before the 1515 partition, Bärweiler – along with Kirn, Sulzbach, Desloch, Niederhundsbach and Oberhundsbach – belonged to the Waldgravial Amt of Kyrburg. In the 16th century, the tithe was due the Waldgraves and Rhinegraves. In the way that was typical for this family, the Waldgravine and Rhinegravine Anna von Kyrburg, according to a 1542 sworn statement by the gatherers of the Türkensteuer (“Turk tax”, imposed in the Holy Roman Empire ostensibly to help the Emperor ward off the “Turkish threat”), had lent out church holdings and assumed the lease herself. She also held the right to appoint the parish priest. Presumably, the clergyman posted to the designated chapel was paid (1507). In 1515, there was a division of Waldgravial-Rhinegravial holdings between Waldgraves and Rhinegraves Philipp (von Dhaun) and Johann VII (von Kyrburg), both Waldgrave and Rhinegrave Johann VI’s sons, who in 1499 had succeeded their father as his rightful successors. Also reaching the present day from that time is this extract from another Weistum, the Bärweiler Kyrburg Amt Weistum (Berwyler Kirberger ampts wystum):

Scholtes und scheffen doselbst wyßen und herkennen u.(unseren) gn.(ädigen) h.(erren) die Ringrafen wilcher Kirberg inhait, vor obergeriechtshern uf der syten nach der kirchen zu und uf der syten do auch die kirch uf stete; die ander syten setzen sie uf die lehenbrief, so die Fust haben, dieselbigen zu besiechten, ob sie der syten geriechtshern sint oder nit, menlichem sins rechten unverlustig. Ir wystum ist gar irrig, deshalb nit dann wie itz gehort ufgeschr. Fron wißen sie denen die uf u. gn. h. syten zum jar eyn mail ghen Kyrberg und pacht und frucht auch schuldig dar zu foren.

In translation, this comes out as follows:

Schultheiß and Schöffen (roughly “lay jurists”) thereat know and recognize our kind lords the Rhinegraves who hold Kyrburg for chief lords of the court on the side towards the churches and on the side where the church stands; the other side they set out in the letter of enfeoffment, thus the Fusts have to see to it whether they are that side’s court lords or not, if they are not to forfeit their rights. Their wisdom is quite wrong, thus then not as now heard written up. In lordly manner they know to whom what on our kind lords’ side are also owing towards Kyrburg once a year and the lease and fruit there.

From this Weistum it is clear that even in the 16th century, besides the Waldgraves and Rhinegraves, the Fuste von Stromberg, too, still held rights in Bärweiler. Consequently, not only was the village split into two shares by ownership, but taxpaying was likewise not all to the same authority. The church at that time (now Evangelical) served as an orientation point in the matter of the ownership relations in the divided village. When the family Merxheim died out in 1440, the Fuste raised a claim on the succession to the Ganerbenschaft, which not surprisingly led to a dispute between them and the Waldgraves, which was still not settled by 1508. Only in 1556 did the said parties’ descendants redeem the amount of 24 Malter of corn. Nonetheless, the disagreements continued until 1581. A document from 13 July of that year mentions Philipp Reichardt Fust von Stromberg as the holder of the lordship over the fief at Berweiler. In 1589, there was a boundary survey between Bärweiler and Meddersheim, which was cited in a later dispute over the two municipalities’ municipal areas. On hand at the Kirn town archive are extracts about taxes from 1589 to 1606 that the village of Bärweiler had to pay yearly to the bursar in Kyrburg.

=== 17th century ===
During the Reformation, the church in Bärweiler was raised to parish church. In 1605, the then pastor Melchior Beerwein tried unsuccessfully to return to the customs of widow’s estates and using the churchyard. Little is known about what happened in Bärweiler during the Thirty Years' War (1618–1648), but it is known that this war swept through the land with all its ferocity. In 1620, Spanish troops took, after Kreuznach, Simmern and Böckelheim, also Sobernheim. From 1631 to 1632, the Swedes “freed” the Nahe region. In 1639, too, the Swedes marched through the land, in 1641 once again the Spaniards and then in 1644 the French. The old road from Mainz by way of Tholey to Metz touched Bärweiler’s municipal area right nearby. A document kept at the state archive at Koblenz tells of a battle near Bärweiler – partly within what are now municipal limits – at the Schwarzenberg. It was apparently quite bloody, but no exact date – not even the year – has been recorded. This is what it says:

…is to prove that in the Thirty Years’ War a battle between the Swedish and opposed nations was held on the Schwartzenberg, at which many people remained, who on the kind lordship’s orders had to be buried by people from Meddersheim and Kirschroth…

=== 18th century ===
On 17 December 1709, “Carl, Waldgrave at Dhaun Kirburg, Rhinegrave at the Stein, Count at Salm, Lord at Vinstingen and Püttlingen” let his estate, which lay within Bärweiler’s limits, to the Lauschied Schultheiß, Johann Michel Hoffmann, for a term of 18 years. This deal held true not only for Hoffmann himself, but in case of his death, also for his wife and any heirs. The lease was to expire in 1728. It was furthermore set forth that Hoffmann was to do the following:

jedes Jahr umb Martini davon uns entrichtet an Pfacht neun Mltr. halb Korn und halb habern in hiesiger Maß.

Translated, this would be:

each year about Michaelmas thereof pay us in rent nine Malter of half corn and half oats in local measurements.

In the early 18th century, Bärweiler twice drew a grim lot in a short time. In both 1710 and 1719, a great part of the village burnt down. Pastor Webner wrote the following about the 1710 fire in the church chronicle:

Many old men still remember having heard from their parents that this village burnt down twice, about which the confirmation is to be found in the Evangelical community’s 1711–1754 church book deposited at the Oberschultheißerei at Merxheim. … The story goes that the whole village burnt down, that the pastor’s dwelling at least was among those buildings burnt down, and thus the pastor of Abtweiler had to conduct church services in the interim, although without a church, since that had also burnt down. Furthermore, that church book likewise bears witness in the marriage register, where it says: Ao. 1714 30 October Johann Adam Greulach … married at the reduced-to-ashes church.

A short time later, Webner wrote the following about the 1719 fire:

The second fire that struck Berweiler broke out on 14 May 1719 on Rogation Sunday right after church services towards nine o’clock in the morning. The church was thus built again, likely in 1715 or 1716, because no further note can be found about the burnt-out church. Within three hours, 19 houses burnt down, on the left side to anyone going down into the village. In the uppermost house, where Jacob Hofmann currently lives, the owner Philipp Schnell, along with his wife and 14-year-old son, lost their lives. They were found suffocated in the cellar. By these misfortunes the community was quite shattered. To build the houses again, the woodlands were cut down, and the many important debts that were made were inherited by children and grandchildren. Even fruit trees were cut down for building wood.

In 1745, official acts at Schloß Anholt on 28 February and at Dhaun on 24 March yielded documents stating that Christian Otto, Waldgrave at Dhaun and Kyrburg, Rhinegrave at the Stein, Count at Salm, Lord of Vinstingen, Püttlingen and Dimmeringen had received, among other things, the Faust fief at Beerweiler along with many other rights to tithes and clergy appointments in other villages, for they had all passed back to him. In 1750, the younger line of Dhaun died out. In the Waldgravial-Rhinegravial territory, the Catholic line of Salm-Kyrburg gained ever greater influence. Prince Johann Dominik took over the government. Unlike any other Waldgrave-Rhinegrave, he cared for his subjects’ welfare and for the enhancement of the people’s education. Not only in Kirn did he have many buildings built and maintained (for example the Piarist monastery and the College), but also in the villages of his Oberamt, where many churches and schools arose through his efforts. In Bärweiler at that time, both a Catholic church and a Catholic school were brought into being. Until the French occupation of the lands on the Rhine’s left bank towards the end of the 18th century, Bärweiler belonged to the Waldgraves and Rhinegraves at Kyrburg. This princely lordship ended in 1792 with the conquest of the Nahe region by French Revolutionary troops. Until October 1795, France busied itself at taking over these lands and incorporating them into its territory. In the course of this takeover, the Canton of Meisenheim was created, to which Bärweiler belonged.

=== 19th century ===
After the end of Napoleonic rule, introduced by the Battle of Leipzig (“Battle of the Nations”; 16 to 18 October 1813), the Kingdom of Prussia annexed the territory south of the Nahe. After the Treaty of Paris (30 May 1814), the region between the Rhine and the Moselle on the one side and the French border on the other – an area within which lay Bärweiler – was jointly ruled by the Emperor of Austria and the King of Bavaria. After only two years, the rulers ceded the Canton of Meisenheim to the Landgraves of Hesse-Homburg. In the late 19th century, Bärweiler saw its administrative arrangements change several times. Beginning in 1869, the municipality was part of the Meisenheim district, after having belonged from 1816 to the Hesse-Homburg Oberamt of Meisenheim until 1866, when it was joined to Prussia’s Rhine Province, and within that to the Regierungsbezirk of Koblenz. When industrialization began in the region towards the end of the 19th century, Bärweiler took no part in it, for then there was no good transport link with the Nahe valley. Bärweiler thus remained purely an agrarian village.

=== 20th century ===
In the First World War (1914–1918), all male villagers who were capable of fighting were called into the forces. A memorial in the village shows that twelve of them fell. The war’s outbreak cut deeply into Bärweiler’s fabric. The reeve at that time, Philipp Karl Hofmann, put together a wartime chronicle of the village of Bärweiler. Unfortunately, the entries only run from the war’s onset up to November 1917. His writings tell of not only the economic effects that the Great War had on the village, but also the social ones. About the outbreak of the war, he wrote:

When on 2 August 1914 the mobilization became known by telephone also in our village, one of the consequences was of enthusiasm among the villagers for all members of the army hurrying bravely to the flag. The authorities found themselves in such difficulties that they could only deal with them all by working day and night and with effort.

On the other hand, the same writer’s tone was quite different in this later entry when writing of the same event:

Hard times. When… in the last days of July 1914 the state of war… hung over Germany… By the telephone news, our villagers, too, ended up in horror and great sensation … The people were in the field cutting corn when suddenly the surprising news came and everybody, in the middle of what they were doing, hurried home deeply moved, gathered in the streets and complained to each other about what the future had yet to bring us. When shortly thereafter on 2 August, the unforgettable day, the first day of mobilization, the news came telegraphically, that our Fatherland was being threatened all around by a wave of foes. The Lord God will lead us through hard times to victory, and bestow upon our Fatherland once more golden peace.

The Minister of the Interior made an appeal to the rural population to take in, as far as was possible, children from cities and industrial centres. In 1917 alone, 12 such children were sheltered in Bärweiler, and in 1918, five. Throughout the Bürgermeisterei (“Mayoralty”) of Meddersheim, according to Mayor Weyrauch’s figures, it was 15 in 1917 and 58 in 1918. About it, he wrote:

The children looked upon meeting them very wretched, pale and emaciated… Anyway, the stay agreed with the town children very well, for, chipper and strengthened they could after a few weeks go back home.

Towards the end of the war, there was in Bärweiler, as there was in neighbouring villages, much billeting of German troop units coming back from the fighting. This first modern war of the 20th century also took tribute from Bärweiler. The wartime chronicle kept from 1914 to 1917 indicates that up to that time, eight villagers who went to the fighting received the Iron Cross, although by then, as many had also fallen, and eleven had been wounded. All together, twelve men from Bärweiler fell in the First World War.

==== Weimar Republic ====
The first twelve years of the Weimar Republic were in the Rhineland a time of French occupation. In June 1920, a shooting range (Champ de tir de Kirn) was set up near Merxheim. Between 5 and 11 July, in the area among Merxheim, Meckenbach, Krebsweiler, Heimbach, Limbach, Kirschroth, Meddersheim and on the Nahe’s banks from Merxheim to Sobernheim, artillery exercises were conducted. Bärweiler’s municipal area bordered in the southeast on the restricted area. Bärweiler was, at least in the beginning, more heavily affected by the shooting range. In the time from 21 to 27 August 1920, the French artillery once more conducted live shooting exercises at the troop drilling ground. Part of Bärweiler’s municipal area also lay in the danger zone. Some 60 ha of it was affected. In September 1920, 12 ha of land was to be sown with winter grain and another 10 with potatoes. After an order from the French general of the Rhine Army, the live shooting exercises were restricted to Sundays, Mondays and Fridays until noon. Thus, the farmers raising the aforesaid crops could use the rest of that time to tend them. Otherwise, the Merxheim shooting range did not affect life in Bärweiler much at all. Most neighbouring villages, on the other hand, from 1919 to 1920 and in later years, had to put up with billeting of a great number of occupational troops when exercises were being conducted. In the 1920s, not only the clubs offered opportunities for communication but also as gathering places there were one or two inns. Only in 1928/1929 was the first kermis (church consecration festival, locally known as the Kerb) after the war held. Unlike what happened in the cities, the high unemployment that characterized the 1920s in Germany had no direct effects in Bärweiler. Many family members could find modest livelihoods in farming or forestry (for example in barking). Many women and girls from Bärweiler, Hundsbach, Lauschied and other villages lived “in the beggarliest circumstances”. Even the Ewald gelatine works was short of manpower.

==== Third Reich and Second World War ====
As in other places in Germany, a “Hitler Oak” was planted in Bärweiler right after Adolf Hitler and the Nazis seized power. It stood near today’s warriors’ memorial. The National Socialist régime’s Gleichschaltung set in right after the seizure of power and even in the smallest villages, it did not spare club life. The warriors’ club still staged memorial celebrations for those who had fallen in the First World War. The church and singing club participated in these as well. As elsewhere, the warriors’ club quickly submitted itself to Nazi ideology: “The warriors’ club, in the spring of 1933, always participated fully and wholly in the celebration of the National Rising of our people.” The youth – an important factor in Nazi power politics – were drawn in from the beginning, even in Bärweiler. Youthful membership in clubs and other organizations thereby virtually ceased to exist. Documents were compiled as to who had joined which mass Nazi organization, and when (that is, the Hitler Youth, the League of German Girls, the Deutsches Jungvolk or whatever). Although on 1 September 1939 only three or four men from the village went to the war, later all men capable of fighting were called into the Wehrmacht, which amounted to 68 men, and that meant at least one man from almost every household. As early as the spring of 1940, bombs fell within Bärweiler’s municipal limits for the first time, among them one demolition bomb and several incendiaries. They did no damage to the village itself, although the craters were still visible long after the war. Bärweiler was mostly spared Allied bombings as the war wore on. The war’s consequences were harsh: Of 74 men who went away to fight, 17 did not return. To this day, eight local soldiers’ fates are unknown. One family lost three sons, while several others each lost two. The last to return was a man who had been held in the Soviet Union and who arrived back home on 7 December 1949. The population’s supply of everyday goods was at this time worse than it had been during the war. Rationing was still the rule. Until early 1948, food rationing cards were still in use.

==== Since the Second World War ====
After the 1948 currency reform, a measure of normalcy began to return to village life. In 1949, Bärweiler began holding kermises again. A year later, the gymnastic club was refounded. Since the club had no apparatus at its disposal, it produced two theatrical plays each winter. The admission was 1 DM for each playgoer and the proceeds were used to buy new gymnastic apparatus. The first mayor after the war was Willi Kistner, who was chosen by municipal decision. He remained in office for three years. In 1950, Bärweiler had 420 inhabitants, a peak for the 20th century. It can be explained by the presence in the village at that time of 12 Germans driven out of Germany’s former eastern territories and other refugees. Moreover, people who had lost homes to bombing in the cities temporarily sought shelter in Bärweiler. Once their dwellings had been reconstructed or repaired, these people mostly went back to their towns and their jobs. Only a few of the refugees stayed in Bärweiler or neighbouring villages. Several medals from the contest Unser Dorf soll schöner werden (“Our village should become lovelier”) bear witness to the successful village renewal measures, which have made Bärweiler into a showplace over the last 20 years.

=== Jewish history ===
Bärweiler once had a small Jewish community that was actually an outlying part of the Jewish community in Hundsbach. See the relevant sections of that article for the community’s history and information about its synagogue.

== Religion ==
As at 31 December 2012, there are 246 full-time residents in Bärweiler, and of those, 176 are Evangelical (71.545%), 30 are Catholic (12.195%), 2 (0.813%) belong to other religious groups and 38 (15.447%) either have no religion or will not reveal their religious affiliation.

== Politics ==
=== Municipal council ===
The council is made up of 6 council members, who were elected by majority vote at the municipal election held on 7 June 2009, and the honorary mayor as chairman.

=== Mayor ===
Bärweiler’s mayor is Helmut Schmell.

=== Coat of arms ===
The German blazon reads: In Rot-Gold geschachten Schild eine schwarze Spitze, belegt mit goldenem Löwenkopf.

The municipality’s arms might in English heraldic language be described thus: Chequy gules and Or a pile transposed sable charged with a lion’s head erased of the second langued of the first.

The village of Bärweiler was a fief from the Waldgraviate in the family Stromberg’s and the family von Merxheim’s hands as a Ganerbschaft (a kind of condominium). In 1382, part of the village and the court found its way into the hands of Waldgraves Otto and Friedrich at Kyrburg. In 1461, “Fust” von Stromberg acquired his cousin Syffryt von Stromberg’s fief. The Waldgraves of Kyrburg bore arms gules three lions Or (a red shield with three gold lions). Fust (Faust) von Stromberg bore arms chequy gules and Or (with a chequered pattern, with alternating squares of red and gold). The “chequy” pattern in these arms thus symbolizes the link to the Lords of Stromberg. The “pile transposed” (the wedge-shaped element) symbolizes the Langenstein (local menhir), while the charge thereon, the lion’s head, is a reference to the village’s former allegiance to the Waldgraves of Kyrburg.

== Culture and sightseeing ==
=== Buildings ===
The following are listed buildings or sites in Rhineland-Palatinate’s Directory of Cultural Monuments:

- Evangelical church, Neugasse 3 – aisleless church, essentially Gothic (before 1509), remodelled about 1800, expanded 1955/1956
- Saint John the Baptist’s Catholic Church (Kirche St. Johann Baptist), Hauptstraße 12 – Late Baroque aisleless church, quarrystone, 1770, Court Master Builder Johann Thomas Petri
- Hauptstraße 19 – former bakehouse, possibly from the 17th century
- Hauptstraße 45 – former school; villalike two-part Heimatstil building, marked 1913
- Vordergasse 8 – estate complex; stable-house, marked 1887; dwelling, partly timber-frame, earlier half of the 19th century; house, mid 19th century
- Jewish graveyard, near Judenkopf (monumental zone) – witnessed in 1824 to 1886; two gravestones and two pedestals

=== Sport and leisure ===
Hiking trails around Bärweiler and to the Langenstein (local menhir) invite hikers to view and explore the village.

== Economy and infrastructure ==
=== Transport ===
To the north runs Bundesstraße 41. Serving Bad Sobernheim is a station on the Nahe Valley Railway (Bingen–Saarbrücken).
