= Raumbach =

- Municipality
- Coat of arms

- Location of Raumbach within Bad Kreuznach district
- Interactive map of Raumbach
- Location within Germany Location within Rhineland-Palatinate
- Coordinates: 49°43′20.2″N 7°39′11.68″E
- Country: Germany
- State: Rhineland-Palatinate
- District: Bad Kreuznach
- Municipal assoc.: Nahe-Glan

Government
  - Mayor (2019–24): Jürgen Soffel

Area
  - Total: 4.42 km^{2} (1.71 sq mi)
- Elevation: 157 m (515 ft)

Population (2025-12-31)
  - Total: 427
  - Density: 96.6/km^{2} (250/sq mi)
- Time zone: UTC+01:00 (CET)
  - Summer (DST): UTC+02:00 (CEST)
- Postal codes: 55592
- Dialling codes: 06753
- Vehicle registration: KH
- Website: www.raumbach.de

Raumbach is an Ortsgemeinde – a municipality belonging to a Verbandsgemeinde, a kind of collective municipality – in the Bad Kreuznach district in Rhineland-Palatinate, Germany. It belongs to the Verbandsgemeinde Nahe-Glan.

== Geography ==
=== Location ===
Raumbach is a linear village (by some definitions, a “thorpe”) that lies between Meisenheim and Rehborn on the left (west) side of the lower Glan valley in a part of the North Palatine Uplands characterized mainly by cropfields and woodland. This landscape is part of the Glan-Alsenz Uplands and comprises the southern part of the Bad Kreuznach district with its picturesquely arranged low mountain range, which is also rich in waterbodies. A variety of landforms from hills and dales, some more pronounced than others, to steep slopes and others that are not quite as steep can be found, along with frequent changes from cropfields and meadows on the one hand to woods on the other. Raumbach sits at an elevation of 160 m above sea level.

=== Neighbouring municipalities ===
Clockwise from the north, Raumbach's neighbours are the municipalities of Abtweiler and Rehborn, the town of Meisenheim, and the municipalities of Desloch and Lauschied, although it touches the last at only one point. All these places likewise lie within the Bad Kreuznach district.

== History ==
=== Prehistory ===
It is unknown when the first settlers came to the Raumbach valley, nor is it even known what tribe they belonged to. Archaeological finds from the time of the Celtic habitation of the Glan-Nahe region have led to the conclusion that even a few centuries before the Christian Era, there were people living in scattered homesteads here. There were no longer any nomads, but rather settled farmers who worked the land, raised livestock and understood how to make themselves articles for everyday use from bronze, iron and clay. To defend themselves against the unending threat of invasion by Germanic peoples from the east, they built refuge castles girded by ringwalls on mountaintops. One such ringwall supposedly stood on the Raumberg above what is now the village. Settled in those days were, not the dales, as they were mostly boggy and offered people and livestock no haven from the threat of flooding, but rather the heights and slopes.

=== Roman times ===
When the Romans conquered Gaul and thereby what is now known as the Rhineland as well, in the 1st century BC, the Celtic speech was displaced by Latin, and along with the Roman legions came Roman merchants, craftsmen and farmers, bringing along with them to Gaul, including the Celtic tribal areas on the Rhine’s left bank, Roman culture. Many Roman settlements sprang up out of Roman army camps, while the region’s prehistoric paths were upgraded to proper paved roads – Roman roads. Bearing witness to Roman times in the area are the Roman road that leads by Meisenheim, the Roman monument in Schweinschied, the Viergötterstein (a “four-god stone”, a pedestal on which a Jupiter Column was customarily stood) from Löllbach, the Odenbach Mercury, Roman coins, glassware, pottery (terra sigillata) and legionaries’ grave monuments.

=== Migration Period ===
The Migration Period and the attendant threat to the city of Rome itself by the Germanic tribes in AD 410 underlay the Roman military and civil administration's pullout from the Rhineland and the Province of Gaul. The power vacuum was at first filled by the Alemanni, and then after the 496 Battle of Tolbiac by the Franks (both Germanic peoples). Latin then ceased to be either the official or the vernacular language. The new one was now Frankish. Just as the original Celts had mingled with the Romans, the remaining Romans now became part of the Frankish population. Stretching from the heights of the Hunsrück far into the Palatinate in Frankish times was the Nahegau. Over time, this county was partitioned, giving rise to the Waldgraves, the Gaugrafen (“Gau Counts”), the Rhinegraves, the Counts of Veldenz and the Kyrburg and Dhaun lines.

=== Further colonization ===
Since the population was growing, more forest had to be cleared to make way for more cropland and also to make more living room for settlers. Thus, at first a homestead arose at a spring, and then, bit by bit, given favourable conditions, further farms were added, leading eventually to a villagelike settlement. In Raumbach, however, these favourable conditions were not at hand at first: the dale was all too narrow and there was no road that was passable in all weather and all seasons, not even enough to unite the homesteads at each end of the narrow dale so that they could grow into a village. Only in 1846 was a paved road, the Provinzialstraße Meisenheim - Martinstein, built to link the two parts of the municipality.

=== The Reformation ===
Under Duke Ludwig II, the Reformation was introduced into the County Palatine of Zweibrücken and into Raumbach, along with every other place in the duchy. By the end of it all, Unterraumbach and Oberraumbach – the two separate centres that had not yet been joined by a good road – together formed a thoroughly Protestant community. Arising in this time (1558) was the Protestant chapel, the first house of worship known in Raumbach's history. Under Count Palatine Wolfgang, the country experienced an economic blossoming. Miners came from the Tyrol to work the deposits in Obermoschel, on the Moschellandsberg, on the Lemberg and on the Stahlberg. Since Duke Wolfgang had granted the professionals that he had summoned to the country religious freedom, a number of the newcomers were Catholic. Further Catholics settled in Raumbach from foreign armies in times of war, wounded soldiers who chose to settle here. Names such as Golsong, Sottong and Ellrich hearken back to this time.

=== Spaniards and Frenchmen ===
Two years after the Thirty Years' War broke out, thus in 1620, Imperial-Spanish troops commanded by the notorious General Marquis Ambrogio Spinola (1569–1630) advanced on Meisenheim. Since that town could not put forth the war contributions that Spinola demanded, Spinola had his troops set all the surrounding villages ablaze. Not long after the Spaniards had withdrawn, an even more dreadful foe came to the country: the Plague. How great the loss of life was in Raumbach is something that cannot be determined. In Meisenheim alone, 45 deaths were registered in May of that year. The hardship was so great that over the summer, no more coffins could be made for lack of wood. It was the time of the Counterreformation that brought people the greatest misery and destroyed Meisenheim's and its surrounding villages’ prosperity through warfare, deprivation, plundering, sickness and intolerance. French King Louis XIV's wars of conquest, whose goal was to push France's frontier to the Rhine, struck the Palatinate particularly hard. While this time the town of Meisenheim and its surrounding villages were largely spared the destruction that had characterized past wars, the poverty was so frightful that in many villages, not even one cow was to be found. In 1815, when Napoleonic times had been brought to an unambiguous end, the Prussians acquired the lands on the Rhine's left bank. The Oberamt of Meisenheim passed to the administration of the Landgraves of Hesse-Homburg, eventually passing in 1866 to the Kingdom of Prussia. The new ruler set about mending the ravages of bygone wars and reorganizing the administration.

=== Hesse-Homburg and Prussian rule ===
In the time when Hesse-Homburg ruled Raumbach, three events were of far-reaching importance:

1. Landgrave Ludwig Wilhelm's 1838 school edict;
2. The laying out of the new graveyard in the years 1832-1843;
3. The building of the Provinzialstraße (provincial road) in 1846.

With the incorporation of the Oberamt of Meisenheim into the Prussian state in 1866, the Raumbach villagers became Prussian citizens. In 1901, the denominational school, which played a part in drawing the two parts of the village together, was opened. It was also in this time that the Glantalbahn was built. Many of the villagers found work with this railway to earn a livelihood for their families.

=== The world wars ===
In the time about the turn of the 20th century, everyone in the village had his livelihood. Raumbach was, however, shaken out of this calm in 1914 when the First World War broke out. The names of those who fell are inscribed at the local schoolhouse. Despite the heavy financial losses, municipal council decided only a few years after the rampant inflation in the early 1920s to build a watermain, completing the project in 1931. The wounds made by the Great War were hardly healed when in 1939, the Second World War broke out, bringing the village further misery. Raumbach was spared any bombing damage in the war, but the toll in blood was frightful.

=== Recent times ===
Mechanization, which had already set in before the Second World War, only to accelerate after currency reform (introduction of the Deutsche Mark), presented the local farmers with a wholly new problem. Draught animals had to give way to tractors, smaller farms were no longer economically viable, and those who had earned a livelihood at farming had to seek work elsewhere, in factories, building trades and highway construction. The once flourishing winegrowing craft shrank appreciably. The number of agricultural operations shrank likewise. Horses disappeared from the scene; goats and sheep were no longer kept. The farmers’ fate was shared by the craftsmen: the blacksmith, the wainwright, the shoemaker and the tailor all had to shut up shop. Beginning in 1970, schoolchildren from Raumbach attended school at the school centre in Meisenheim, which could offer them better training and transition opportunities for getting into further schooling.

=== Population development ===
Raumbach's population development since Napoleonic times is shown in the table below. The figures for the years from 1871 to 1987 are drawn from census data:

Year	Inhabitants
1815	328
1835	N.A.
1871	481
1905	524
1939	504

Year	Inhabitants
1950	563
1961	489
1970	536
1987	493
2005	444

== Religion ==
As at 30 November 2013, there are 417 full-time residents in Raumbach, and of those, 200 are Evangelical (47.962%), 148 are Catholic (35.492%), 1 belongs to the Free Evangelical Church (0.24%), 11 (2.638%) belong to other religious groups and 57 (13.669%) either have no religion or will not reveal their religious affiliation.

== Politics ==
=== Municipal council ===
The council is made up of 8 council members, who were elected by majority vote at the municipal election held on 7 June 2009, and the honorary mayor as chairman.

=== Mayor ===
Raumbach's mayor is Jürgen Soffel.

=== Coat of arms ===
The municipality's arms might be described thus: Argent a fess wavy vert issuant from which a demilion azure armed and langued gules, in base a bunch of grapes slipped proper.

== Culture and sightseeing ==
=== Buildings ===
The following are listed buildings or sites in Rhineland-Palatinate’s Directory of Cultural Monuments:

- Bachstraße 3 – estate complex; timber-frame house, plastered, 18th or 19th century
- Hauptstraße, graveyard – graveyard cross, marked 1847
- Hauptstraße 11 – complex with single roof ridge, from the earlier half of the 19th century
- Hauptstraße 25 – Baroque building with half-hip roof, timber-frame, sided, possibly from the 18th century
- Hauptstraße 26 – Late Baroque house, marked 1775
- Hauptstraße 33 – Late Baroque quarrystone barn, half-hip roof, marked 1793
- Hauptstraße 81 – former school; two-and-a-half-floor sandstone-block building with Gothic elements, 1900/1901; war memorial plaques 1914/1918
- Untere Bergstraße 4 – complex along the street; Baroque timber-frame house, partly solid, early 18th century
- Water cistern, on Landesstraße 376 – Expressionist plastered building, 1920s

=== Sport and leisure ===
Raumbach has a nature teaching path, a grilling and hiking pavilion (just outside the village on the way to Abtweiler) and a cycle path that leads by way of Rehborn and Odernheim am Glan to the Nahe-Radweg (a major cycle path) at Staudernheim. There is also draisine touring on the local railway.

=== Clubs ===
The following clubs are active in Raumbach:

- Landfrauenverein 1991 Raumbach — countrywomen’s club
- Männergesangsverein Raumbach — men’s singing club
- Turnverein 1902 Raumbach e.V. — gymnastic club
- Verein der Freunde und Förderer der Feuerwehr der Gemeinde Raumbach e.V. — volunteer fire brigade promotional association

== Economy and infrastructure ==
=== Transport ===
Raumbach lies on Landesstraße 376, locally known as Hauptstraße (“Main Street”). This runs down to a junction with Bundesstraße 420 in Meisenheim only about a kilometre from the village. In the other direction it runs north to Abtweiler and then roughly northwestwards to Meddersheim, whence Landesstraße 232 runs a short way into Bad Sobernheim. Serving Staudernheim is a railway station on the Nahe Valley Railway (Bingen–Saarbrücken).

=== Village renewal plan ===
Raumbach has a multifaceted plan for renewing certain aspects of the village. This includes integrating the body of the village into the surrounding landscape by planting trees, orchards and gardens between the built-up area and the countryside (among other ways that are to be employed to bring this about), expansion of residential areas while rounding the edge of the village, remodelling the areas around the bridges by, among other things, planting more greenery, building retaining walls along Hauptstraße and planting vines to climb up them, converting the sport hall into a village community centre with a youth room, and many other measures.

=== Public institutions ===
Raumbach has a community centre, a community hall and a children's playground as well as a Catholic church and a consecration hall at the graveyard.

== Famous people ==
=== Famous people associated with the municipality ===
- Karina Krauß (b. 1983 in Meisenheim), Nahe Wine Queen 2005/2006 (“Karina II”). A Riesling vine at the Königinnenweinberg (“Queens’ Vineyard”) in Norheim was later named after her, as has been the custom for many years.
