= Kirschroth =

- Municipality
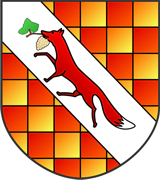
- Coat of arms

- Location of Kirschroth within Bad Kreuznach district
- Interactive map of Kirschroth
- Location within Germany Location within Rhineland-Palatinate
- Coordinates: 49°45′44″N 7°34′28″E
- Country: Germany
- State: Rhineland-Palatinate
- District: Bad Kreuznach
- Municipal assoc.: Nahe-Glan

Government
  - Mayor (2019–24): Ulrike Stroh

Area
  - Total: 7.64 km^{2} (2.95 sq mi)
- Elevation: 270 m (890 ft)

Population (2025-12-31)
  - Total: 277
  - Density: 36.3/km^{2} (93.9/sq mi)
- Time zone: UTC+01:00 (CET)
  - Summer (DST): UTC+02:00 (CEST)
- Postal codes: 55566
- Dialling codes: 06751
- Vehicle registration: KH
- Website: www.kirschroth.de

Kirschroth is an Ortsgemeinde – a municipality belonging to a Verbandsgemeinde, a kind of collective municipality – in the Bad Kreuznach district in Rhineland-Palatinate, Germany. It belongs to the Verbandsgemeinde Nahe-Glan. Kirschroth is a state-recognized tourism community and a winegrowing village.

== Geography ==
=== Location ===
Kirschroth lies in a side valley of the Nahe. Kirschroth's character stems from its agricultural heritage, but it is nowadays a state-recognized tourism resort. It sits at an elevation of 260 m above sea level, making it one of Rhineland-Palatinate's highest winegrowing villages. The municipal area measures 764 ha, of which 284 ha is wooded (140 ha of this is municipal woodland) and roughly 80 ha is given over to vineyards. The vineyards of the Kirschrother Wildgrafenberg border the village on the north and west.

=== Neighbouring municipalities ===
Clockwise from the north, Kirschroth's neighbours are the municipalities of Meddersheim, Bärweiler, Hundsbach, Limbach and Merxheim, all of which likewise lie within the Bad Kreuznach district.

== History ==
In 1364, Kirschroth had its first documentary mention as Rodde. It is certain, though, that it had already existed for quite some time, likely having arisen in the Early Middle Ages. Traces of human habitation may indeed stretch all the way back to Celtic and Roman times. The village was held by the Archbishops of Mainz well into the 12th century before being pledged to the Counts of Saarbrücken, and then about 1275 to the Waldgraves at the Kirburg. They then held it until the French Revolution in 1789. It was administered by a Schultheiß from Mainz who was subject to the castle count at Disibodenberg, or as of 1240 in Sobernheim and as of 1279 at Castle Böckelheim. In 1239, there was a serious dispute between the Archbishop and the counts in the Nahe area who opposed the ecclesiastical prince's quest for power in what they considered their domain. The local lordship over Kirschroth changed many times within the Waldgravial – and beginning in 1408 Waldgravial-Rhinegravial – family, because individual lines sometimes died out, arising from which were complicated divisions of inheritance. Until the 20th century, agriculture was the foremost income earner, and after that, winegrowing. In 1798, the French, to whom the Nahe area had finally fallen, set up their own Mairie (“Mayoralty”) of Meddersheim, which comprised the villages of Meddersheim, Kirschroth and Staudernheim. After the French had been driven out and Napoleon had been definitively defeated, there came a short transitional time, this mairie, now called a Bürgermeisterei (meaning the same thing in German) passed under the terms of the Congress of Vienna to the new Oberamt of Meisenheim within the Landgraviate of Hesse-Homburg, passing once again along with this in 1866 to the Grand Dukes of Hesse-Darmstadt. They lost the Oberamt to the Kingdom of Prussia, which in 1869 made a small rural district out of it. In 1919, the Amt of Meddersheim was formed out of the Bürgermeistereien of Meddersheim and Merxheim, but this was dissolved along with the Meisenheim district in 1932. Beginning in 1935, Kirschroth was in a kind of “personal union” with the town of Sobernheim, and as of 1940, it was fully joined with it in a new Amt called Sobernheim. In 1969, the Amt of Sobernheim became the Verbandsgemeinde of Sobernheim. In 1990, Kirschroth placed third at the state level in the contest Unser Dorf soll schöner werden (“Our village should become lovelier”).

=== Population development ===
Kirschroth's population development since Napoleonic times is shown in the table below. The figures for the years from 1871 to 1987 are drawn from census data:

Year	Inhabitants
1815	262
1835	N.A.
1871	392
1905	350
1939	330

Year	Inhabitants
1950	370
1961	354
1970	346
1987	301
2005	294

== Religion ==
As at 30 September 2013, there are 258 full-time residents in Kirschroth, and of those, 202 are Evangelical (78.295%), 19 are Catholic (7.364%), 1 (0.388%) belongs to another religious group and 36 (13.953%) either have no religion or will not reveal their religious affiliation.

== Politics ==
=== Municipal council ===
The council is made up of 6 council members, who were elected by majority vote at the municipal election held on 7 June 2009, and the honorary mayor as chairman.

=== Mayor ===
Kirschroth's mayor is Ulrike Stroh.

=== Coat of arms ===
The German blazon reads: In rot-gold geschachtem Schild ein silberner Schrägrechtsbalken, belegt mit einem schreitenden roten Fuchs, der eine Weinrebe mit Blatt im Fang hält.

The municipality's arms might in English heraldic language be described thus: Chequy gules and Or a bend argent, thereon a fox passant, in his mouth a bunch of grapes slipped and leafed of one, all proper.

Beginning in 1520, Kirschroth belonged in equal shares to the Waldgraves’ Old Dhaun and Kyrburg lines. The two tinctures seen in the chequered field recall this. The chequered pattern itself is a reference to the village’s former allegiance to the Rhinegraves of Grumbach, to whom Kirschroth belonged until 1792. The fox stands for the term Kirschrother Füchse (“Kirschroth foxes”) customary in the local speech, while the bunch of grapes stands for the all-important local winegrowing.

== Culture and sightseeing ==
=== Buildings ===
The following are listed buildings or sites in Rhineland-Palatinate’s Directory of Cultural Monuments:

- Evangelical church – Late Classicist aisleless church, red-sandstone-block, mid 19th century
- Limbacher Weg 4 – timber-frame house, partly solid, early 19th century
- Merxheimer Straße 3 – estate complex; timber-frame house with stable and produce storehouse, marked 1834, shed with timber-frame storehouse

== Economy and infrastructure ==
=== Transport ===
Running to Kirschroth from the east is Kreisstraße 62, and passing out of the village to the west is Bärweilerweg, which unaccountably leads to Limbach, not Bärweiler. Running to the north is Bundesstraße 41. Serving Bad Sobernheim is a railway station on the Nahe Valley Railway (Bingen–Saarbrücken).
