= Meddersheim =

- Municipality
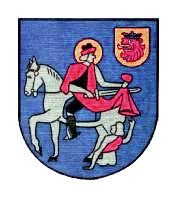
- Coat of arms

- Location of Meddersheim within Bad Kreuznach district
- Interactive map of Meddersheim
- Location within Germany Location within Rhineland-Palatinate
- Coordinates: 49°46′37″N 7°37′06″E
- Country: Germany
- State: Rhineland-Palatinate
- District: Bad Kreuznach
- Municipal assoc.: Nahe-Glan

Government
  - Mayor (2019–24): Renate Weingarth-Schenk

Area
  - Total: 13.15 km^{2} (5.08 sq mi)
- Elevation: 160 m (520 ft)

Population (2025-12-31)
  - Total: 1,309
  - Density: 99.54/km^{2} (257.8/sq mi)
- Time zone: UTC+01:00 (CET)
  - Summer (DST): UTC+02:00 (CEST)
- Postal codes: 55566
- Dialling codes: 06751
- Vehicle registration: KH
- Website: www.meddersheim.de

Meddersheim is an Ortsgemeinde – a municipality belonging to a Verbandsgemeinde, a kind of collective municipality – in the Bad Kreuznach district in Rhineland-Palatinate, Germany. It belongs to the Verbandsgemeinde Nahe-Glan. Meddersheim is a winegrowing village.

== Geography ==
=== Location ===
Meddersheim lies in the Nahe valley between Idar-Oberstein and Bad Kreuznach. South of the village is the edge of the North Palatine Uplands. Fertile vineyards, fields, and wooded heights surround the village.

=== Neighbouring municipalities ===
Clockwise from the north, Meddersheim's neighbours are the municipality of Nußbaum, the town of Bad Sobernheim, and the municipalities of Lauschied, Bärweiler, Kirschroth, Merxheim, and Monzingen, all of which likewise lie within the Bad Kreuznach district.

=== Constituent communities ===
Also belonging to Meddersheim are the outlying homesteads of Lohmühle, Schliffgesmühle, Am Meisenheimer Pfad, and the "Felke-Kurhaus Menschel" ("Englischer Hof").

== History ==
The area that is now Meddersheim was settled as far back as Celtic and Roman times, and perhaps even earlier. Various archaeological finds of remnants of a Roman estate on Römerstraße ("Roman road"), extensive foundations, and an ancient watermain bear witness to this. The current clump village arose in Frankish times (6th century) at a favourable, flat site as a crossroads outside the River Nahe's floodplain. Until the 13th century, the village of Meddersheim belonged to the Archbishops of Mainz, then passing by way of pledge to the Waldgraves at the Kyrburg (castle). They held it until the French Revolutionary Wars in the late 18th century. It was administered by a MainzSchultheiß responsible for the Burgrave at Disibodenberg, beginning in 1240 in Sobernheim and then beginning in 1279 at Castle Böckelheim. In 1239, there was a serious dispute between the Archbishop and the Counts in the Nahe region, who opposed the Prince-Archbishop-Elector's political reach into the Nahe region.

Moreover, there was a disagreement over the pledge of Meddersheim with Kirschroth, which was always bound with Meddersheim. Although the Archbishop redeemed both villages, the Waldgrave at the Kyrburg, heir to the Counts of Saarbrücken, did not wish to give them up. The Archbishop prevailed, but later, one of his successors pledged the Schultheißerei again, this time for good. The feudal and tithing rights were always shared among several lordships. The oldest part of the church, the steeple, comes from the 12th century, while after several conversions and additions, the nave comes from 1756. Particularly worthy of mention are the pulpit from the 18th century, the 1753 Stumm organ, and the 16th-century baptismal font.

In 1798, the French overran the German lands on the Rhine's left bank and imposed their administrative system on the land. Meddersheim became the seat of a mairie ("mayoralty") in the Canton of Meisenheim, which also comprised Kirschroth and Staudernheim and lay in the Department of Sarre. No, later than Napoleonic times, something akin to gavelkind – an equal land division among heirs – was introduced. his led to a splintering of businesses and, in many cases, to impoverishment among smallholder farmers. After Napoleon had been driven out in 1814, Meddersheim was, after a short transitional time, assigned under the terms of the Congress of Vienna in 1816 to the Oberamt of Meisenheim, and it was then furthermore the seat of an Oberschultheißerei. Thus did Meddersheim become, with the Oberamt of Meisenheim an exclave of the Landgraviate of Hesse-Homburg. In 1866, it passed to the Grand Duchy of Hesse. Then, in 1869, the region passed to the Kingdom of Prussia, and Meddersheim now belonged to the Meisenheim district in the Regierungsbezirk of Koblenz in the Rhine Province. In 1919, after the First World War, the Bürgermeistereien ("Mayoralties") of Meddersheim and Merxheim were merged.

After the Meisenheim district was dissolved in 1932, the Amt (as it had been called since 1927) no longer existed. In 1935, Meddersheim had the same municipal administration – as it were, a "personal union" at the municipal level – but in 1940, the former Amt of Meddersheim was merged with the Amt of Sobernheim, from which arose the Verbandsgemeinde of Sobernheim in 1969. On Lehmkaut (a street), remnants of brickworks could still be seen until the 1960s. Made here, right in the village, were field-fired bricks. In Andreas Gottfried's former potter's shop, pottery was made until 1968. The flax extensively grown here on the heaths, whose poorer soils were subjected to controlled burns, was retted in a great flax-retting tank, which is believed to have been communally organized.

In the area of Brechkaut and Brechlöcher (laneways?), there were major brick kilns, and at their ends lay the hot-air shaft measuring about 2 × 3 m on which the flax was retted so that it could then be scutched and heckled. The former herdsmen's houses of the herding association have been gone since the 1950s. Five mills and one pig farm were listed for a time within Meddersheim's limits. At the Ilsberg was a quarry. The red shale sandstone was quarried until some time towards the end of the 18th century, whereafter yellow-grey quarried sandstone from surrounding villages was used. In the Reformation, the inhabitants of Meddersheim became Protestant under the then-local lordship. The Baroque screen around the altar was removed during renovations at Saint Martin'sEvangelical church in 1964. For generations, the church was shared. During Catholic Mass, the gate was closed. A few epitaphs, a ceiling-high sacramental shrine in the Gothic quire and a Stumm organ, together with a series of pictures in the gallery, bear witness to the wealth of this winegrowing, farming and craft village. In 1960, Meddersheim had some 750 inhabitants. By 2010, it was nearly 1,400.

=== Jewish history ===
Meddersheim had a small Jewish community in the 19th century. It arose in the 18th century. The forebears of the Families Feibelmann and Ostermann lived here as early as the latter half of the 18th century. In the 19th century, the number of Jewish inhabitants developed as follows:

- In 1808, 32 Jewish inhabitants were in seven families, and 16 children were altogether.
- In 1855, there were 54.
- In 1861, the Jewish population peaked at 55.

In the latter half of the 19th century, the number shrank owing to migration to the towns and cities, particularly because Meddersheim had no railway link so in 1895, only 23 Jewish inhabitants were left. The Family Feibelmann moved to Sobernheim, while a branch of the Family Ostermann moved to Bochum. In the way of institutions, there was a prayer room in one of the Jewish houses and a graveyard. Jewish children, too, likely got their schooling in one of the Jewish houses. One member of Meddersheim's Jewish community fell in the First World War, Arthur Ostermann (b. 16 September 1890 in Meddersheim, d. 8 December 1914). His name can be found on the memorial to the fallen at the Jewish graveyard in Bad Sobernheim. He is listed as missing in action on the warriors' memorial at Meddersheim's municipal graveyard. Also lost in the Great War was Gefreiter Richard Feibelmann (b. 26 November 1889 in Meddersheim, d. 21 November 1917), but he had moved to Sobernheim by 1914. About 1924, when there were still 16 members of the local Jewish community, they had joined the Jewish community in Sobernheim.

Research in the village has drawn different accounts from Meddersheim inhabitants regarding where the former Jewish community's prayer room was. It could be that services were held at various Jewish houses because no room in the village had been specifically set up for the purpose. Towards the end, services were surely irregular and perhaps held only on high holidays. In 1933, the year when Adolf Hitler and the Nazis seized power, 12 Jews were still living in Meddersheim. In the years that followed, though, some of the Jews moved away or even emigrated in the face of the boycotting of their businesses, the progressive stripping of their rights and repression, all brought about by the Nazis. The livestock dealer Leo Rauner went to Pittsburgh in 1938, and a few Family Ostermann members also went to the United States. In April 1942, the last Jews living in the village, the four-headed Family Braun, were deported. According to the Gedenkbuch – Opfer der Verfolgung der Juden unter der nationalsozialistischen Gewaltherrschaft in Deutschland 1933-1945 ("Memorial Book – Victims of the Persecution of the Jews under National Socialist Tyranny") and Yad Vashem, of all Jews who either were born in Meddersheim or lived there for a long time, seven were killed during Nazi persecution (birthdates in brackets):

1. Hermine Braun née Gärtner (1898)
2. Hildegard Braun (1923)
3. Norbert Braun (1926)
4. Siegmund Braun (1862)
5. Siegmund Braun (1889)
6. Walter Haas (1904)
7. Jakob Ostermann (1872)

== Religion ==
As at 30 November 2013, there are 1,344 full-time residents in Meddersheim, and of those, 811 are Evangelical (60.342%), 250 are Catholic (18.601%), 15 (1.116%) belong to other religious groups and 268 (19.94%) either have no religion or will not reveal their religious affiliation.

== Politics ==
=== Municipal council ===
The council is made up of 16 council members, who were elected by proportional representation at the municipal election held on 7 June 2009, and the honorary mayor as chairwoman. The municipal election held on 7 June 2009 yielded the following results:

Year	SPD	CDU	FWG	UWG	Total
2009	3	3	5	5	16 seats
2004	3	2	7	4	16 seats

=== Mayor ===
Meddersheim's mayor is Renate Weingarth-Schenk, and her deputies are Karl Curt Bamberger, Michael Engisch and Günter Weinel.

=== Coat of arms ===
The German blazon reads: In Blau auf silbernem Roß, der golden nimbierte, rot gekleidete St. Martin, der mit silbernem Schwert den roten Mantel dem auf der Erde sitzenden Bettler zuteilt; im linken Obereck ein goldenes Schildchen, darin ein roter, blau gekrönter Löwenkopf.

The municipality's arms might in English heraldic language be described thus: Azure on a horse passant argent bridled sable and saddled of the field Saint Martin reguardant with nimbus Or vested gules cutting his mantle with a sword of the second for a beggar man sitting on the ground, in sinister chief an inescutcheon of the fourth charged with a lion's head erased of the fifth crowned of the first.

This scene from Saint Martin's life appears in many German civic coats of arms. Indeed, Meddersheim's arms are not even the only ones in the Bad Kreuznach district to bear this image, with Norheim and Rüdesheim an der Nahe likewise bearing arms depicting Martin cutting off a piece of his cloak for a beggar. In Meddersheim's case, the image goes back to the village's old court seal, which also bore this image. Meddersheim's arms are distinguished, however, by the small inescutcheon in sinister chief (upper left corner to the armsbearer, and thus upper right to the viewer). The charge thereon, a lion's head, is a reference to historical lordships. Meddersheim was an Oberschultheißerei in the Waldgraviate-Rhinegraviate. In 1750 it belonged as a condominium to the lines of Salm-Kyrburg and Dhaun, with each holding a one-half share. Salm-Kyrburg bore arms gules three lions Or (a red shield with three gold lions). For heraldic reasons, the lion's head is borne in Meddersheim's arms in reversed tinctures.

=== Town partnerships ===
Meddersheim fosters partnerships with the following places:

- Nea Kios, Argolis, Peloponnese, Greece

The partnership agreement between Meddersheim and Nea Kios (Greek: Νέα Κίος) was read out by mayors Tilo Krauß (Meddersheim) and Georgios Maninis (Nea Kios) and signed amid much festivity on 15 July 2008 in Meddersheim.

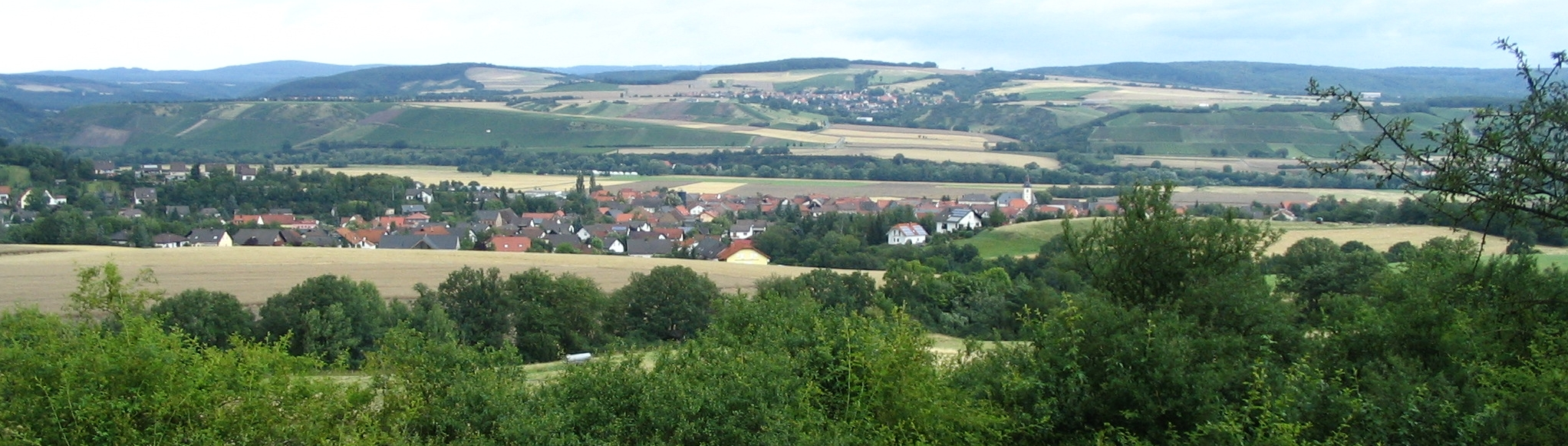
Panorama of Meddersheim from the south

== Culture and sightseeing ==
=== Buildings ===
The following are listed buildings or sites in Rhineland-Palatinate's Directory of Cultural Monuments:

- Evangelical church, Naheweinstraße 32 – Romanesque quire tower, spire 1814, Late Gothic quire, about 1500, Late Baroque aisleless church, 1756; gateway arch to the rectory, mid 19th century, churchyard wall, below in the graveyard gravestones, 19th century
- Hintergasse 15 – timber-frame house, partly solid, marked 1805
- Hohlgasse 1 – Baroque timber-frame house, plastered, possibly 18th century
- Hohlgasse 3 – inn; Classicist timber-frame building, plastered and slated, marked 1830
- Kirschrother Straße 6/8 – estate complex; pair of semi-detached houses, timber framing plastered, marked 1830; commercial building 19th century
- Naheweinstraße, graveyard – Schlarb gravestone, stele with antique relief, towards 1900
- Naheweinstraße 6 – Late Historicist villa, marked 1911
- Naheweinstraße 21 – four-sided estate; Classicist timber-frame house, plastered, about 1830/1840; commercial building, partly timber-frame
- Naheweinstraße 24 – Late Baroque building with hipped mansard roof, timber framing plastered, latter half of the 18th century
- Naheweinstraße 30 – former schoolteacher's house; Baroque building with half-hip roof, marked 1737
- Naheweinstraße 32/34 – Evangelical schoolhouse and rectory; representative building with hip roof, about 1850/1860
- Naheweinstraße 36 – Baroque timber-frame house, partly solid, marked 1723
- Naheweinstraße 46 – former Rhinegravial estate; 16th to 19th centuries; two-part complex of buildings made up of timber-frame houses, built-in staircase tower, marked 1592
- At Naheweinstraße 49 – Classicist door with skylight, marked 1820
- At Neugasse 5 – house door, marked 1834
- Sobernheimer Straße 2 – inn "Zur Traube"; Baroque building with hipped mansard roof, partly timber-frame, marked 1747
- Sobernheimer Straße 5 – Baroque timber-frame house, partly slated, marked 1681 and 1725, alterations in the 19th century
- Sobernheimer Straße 16 – Altes Rathaus ("Old Town Hall"); partly timber-frame, essentially possibly from about 1600 and from the 17th century, ridge turret with bell, 1719
- Unterm Winkel – bridge, two-arched, latter half of the 19th century
- Bridge across the Nahe, on Kreisstraße 62 – five-arched bridge, sandstone-block, about 1860, after demolition with explosives in 1946/1947 reconstructed
- Jewish graveyard "Auf dem Judenkirchhof" (monumental zone) – area with some 40 gravestones from the 18th (?) to early 20th centuries (see also below)
- Schliffgesmühle (mill), on the Nahe – Late Classicist bungalow with knee wall, commercial building, partly timber-frame, mid 19th century

==== Jewish graveyard ====
The Jewish graveyard in Meddersheim was laid out the earlier half of the 19th century (about 1840?) and is documented until sometime after 1933. The last confirmed burial there was in 1935 (Julius Feibelmann, d. 16 September 1935), although it is also believed that Salomon and Babette Braun, as well as a child born in 1937 to the Family Braun who died quite young (Salomon's and Babette's grandchild), were buried at the graveyard later. After the Second World War, the graveyard was first refurbished and fenced in in 1955 with state funding, because the mayor and municipal council had refused to contribute financially to the project, citing the municipality's empty coffers. In 1973, too, the graveyard was refurbished, with gravestones that had fallen over or been thrown about being set upright again. The graveyard's area is 1,358 m^{2}. Thirty-one graves can still be made out. The gravestones quite likely do not all stand in their original places. The graveyard lies southeast of Meddersheim on the slope of the Dornberg near the so-called Mühlenwäldchen ("Little Mill Wood").

=== Winegrowing ===
Meddersheim has four wineries (Weingüter) and one winemakers' collective. The Meddersheim winegrowing area belongs to the winemaking appellation – Großlage – of "Paradiesgarten". Well known individual winegrowing locations – Einzellagen – are the "Altenberg", the "Edelberg" and the "Rheingrafenberg". On roughly 60% of the village's vineyard area, it is the Riesling grape that is grown. Meddersheim's wineries are listed here:

- Weingut Bamberger
- Weingut Hehner-Kiltz
- Weingut Hexamer
- Weingut Schlarb

Meddersheim belongs to the Nahe wine region. Far beyond the district's limits, Meddersheim is known for its wine festival. The local winemakers offer their wares each year on the last weekend in August at the village square. There the festival begins with the tapping of the Meddersheim wine barrel and the free dispensing of the contents by the incumbent mayor. As well, the local clubs supply the guests with alcohol-free drinks and food. This festival draws hundreds to the village each year.

=== Unser Dorf hat Zukunft ===
Vying in 2012 in the contest Unser Dorf hat Zukunft ("Our village has a future") at the state level were 269 municipalities. Twenty-four villages qualified in the state judging in the main and special classes. Among the 12 villages in the main class, Meddersheim earned a respectable place in the middle of the field. Before this, Meddersheim had qualified at the district and regional (Koblenz) contests as a winner in the main class. This was quite outstanding for a village that had not competed in this contest – then known as Unser Dorf soll schöner werden ("Our village should become lovelier") – for more than 20 years.

=== Clubs ===
The following clubs are active in Meddersheim:

- Angelsportverein — angling club
- Apollo-Chor — choir
- Förderverein Feuerwehr — fire brigade promotional association
- Förderverein Evangelische Martinskirche — Saint Martin's church promotional association
- Förderverein Kindergarten — kindergarten promotional association
- Frauenhilfe — women's aid
- Freiwillige Feuerwehr — volunteer fire brigade
- Fremdenverkehrsverein — tourism club
- Hunsrückverein — local history, culture and hiking club
- Jugendclub — youth club
- Landfrauen Meddersheim — countrywomen's club
- Motorsportclub Meddersheim — motorsport club
- Schießsportverein — shooting sport club
- Stobbler — club for partying and making wine out of grape remnants left after harvest in local vineyards
- Turn- und Sportverein — gymnastic and sport club
- VdK — social advocacy group local chapter

== Economy and infrastructure ==
=== Education ===
Meddersheim has a kindergarten (Kindergarten Rasselbande) and the Volksbildungswerk Meddersheim (a "people's education" programme), but other than these, all education is to be found in neighbouring municipalities or farther afield in the case of colleges and universities. The Grundschule Monzingen (primary school) is in neighbouring Monzingen, while the Realschule plus Bad Sobernheim and the Emanuel-Felke-Gymnasium are both in neighbouring Bad Sobernheim.

=== Transport ===
Running through Meddersheim is Landesstraße 232, which is met in the village core by Kreisstraße 52 and Landesstraße 376. Just over 2 km along the first of these roads is an interchange onto Bundesstraße 41 in Bad Sobernheim's west end. Also serving Bad Sobernheim is a railway station on the Nahe Valley Railway (Bingen–Saarbrücken).

== Famous people ==
=== Honorary citizens ===
- Werner Hilkene (1927–2010), former mayor from 1964 to 1999, recipient of the Verdienstmedaille des Landes Rheinland-Pfalz (Rhineland-Palatinate Service Medal) and the Verbandsgemeinde Service Badge in bronze, silver and gold.
