= Jeckenbach =

- Municipality
- Coat of arms

- Location of Jeckenbach within Bad Kreuznach district
- Interactive map of Jeckenbach
- Location within Germany Location within Rhineland-Palatinate
- Coordinates: 49°42′37″N 7°36′28″E
- Country: Germany
- State: Rhineland-Palatinate
- District: Bad Kreuznach
- Municipal assoc.: Nahe-Glan

Government
  - Mayor (2019–24): Christa Venter

Area
  - Total: 6.28 km^{2} (2.42 sq mi)
- Elevation: 190 m (620 ft)

Population (2025-12-31)
  - Total: 198
  - Density: 31.5/km^{2} (81.7/sq mi)
- Time zone: UTC+01:00 (CET)
  - Summer (DST): UTC+02:00 (CEST)
- Postal codes: 55592
- Dialling codes: 06753
- Vehicle registration: KH

Jeckenbach is an Ortsgemeinde – a municipality belonging to a Verbandsgemeinde, a kind of collective municipality – in the Bad Kreuznach district in Rhineland-Palatinate, Germany. It belongs to the Verbandsgemeinde Nahe-Glan.

== Geography ==
=== Location ===
Jeckenbach is a linear village (by some definitions, a "thorpe") that lies in the North Palatine Uplands west of the Glan.

=== Neighbouring municipalities ===
Clockwise from the north, Jeckenbach's neighbours are the municipalities of Bärweiler, Lauschied, Desloch, Breitenheim, Löllbach, Schweinschied and Hundsbach, all of which likewise lie within the Bad Kreuznach district.

=== Geology ===
Jeckenbach is an important site for fossil finds from the Rotliegend (Permian) some 290,000,000 years ago. It was here that amateur palaeontologist Arnulf Stapf from Nierstein am Rhein unearthed the oldest mayflies (Misthodotes stapfi) ever found in Central Europe. Further fossils that were brought to light were of fishes and amphibians. Finds from Jeckenbach are kept at the Palaeontological Museum in Nierstein.

== History ==
From 1816 to 1866, Jeckenbach belonged to the Oberamt of Meisenheim in the Landgraviate of Hesse-Homburg, along with which it passed in 1866 to the Kingdom of Prussia.

=== Population development ===
Jeckenbach's population development since Napoleonic times is shown in the table below. The figures for the years from 1871 to 1987 are drawn from census data:

Year	Inhabitants
1815	282
1835	N.A.
1871	450
1905	410
1939	373

Year	Inhabitants
1950	397
1961	371
1970	389
1987	316
2005	282

== Religion ==
As at 30 September 2013, there are 253 full-time residents in Jeckenbach, and of those, 206 are Evangelical (81.423%), 20 are Catholic (7.905%), 1 (0.395%) belongs to another religious group and 26 (10.277%) either have no religion or will not reveal their religious affiliation.

== Politics ==
=== Municipal council ===
The council is made up of 6 council members, who were elected by majority vote at the municipal election held on 7 June 2009, and the honorary mayor as chairwoman.

=== Mayor ===
Jeckenbach's mayor is Christa Venter.

=== Coat of arms ===
The municipality's arms might be described thus: Argent on a base wavy gules a lion rampant azure armed, langued and crowned of the second, in his forepaws an inescutcheon of the second charged with a cross Maltese of the first.

== Culture and sightseeing ==
=== Buildings ===
The following are listed buildings or sites in Rhineland-Palatinate's Directory of Cultural Monuments:

- Evangelical church, Mühlstraße – Late Baroque aisleless church, marked 1767, architect possibly Philipp Heinrich Hellermann, west tower essentially Romanesque, 11th or 12th century, belfry and spire Baroque; Classicist stairway, 1852
- Deslocher Straße – bridge, one arch, quarrystone, possibly from the earlier half of the 19th century
- Hauptstraße (at the municipal hall) – arch bridge across the Jeckenbach, marked 1874
- Mühlstraße – bridge, one arch, sandstone-block, possibly from the latter half of the 19th century
- Near Mühlstraße 5 – bridge, one arch, possibly from the mid 19th century
- Mühlstraße 9 – estate complex along the street; timber-frame house, plastered, marked 1841, barn, marked 1833
- Across from Mühlstraße 10 – Baroque timber-frame house, plastered, 18th century
- So-called Römerbrunnen ("Roman well”), südöstlich des Orts, im Stried – sweep well complex, apparently from Roman times
- Weinbergshaus ("Vineyard House"), north of the village – Historicized building with gable roof, possibly from the 1920s

Jeckenbach also has a theatre club which puts on yearly plays. For the village's youth, a youth clubhouse with a grilling pavilion has been built about 1.5 km outside the village on a hill.

== Economy and infrastructure ==
=== Transport ===
Running through Hundsbach is Landesstraße 182, which links to Bundesstraße 420 at Meisenheim to the southeast. In the other direction, the road leads to Becherbach bei Kirn and then Kirn itself, where it links with Bundesstraße 41. Landesstraße 182 also has a junction with Landesstraße 374 just before Becherbach bei Kirn, which leads to Bundesstraße 270 at Sien. Branching off Landesstraße 182 just outside the village is Landesstraße 373. Serving Bad Sobernheim is a railway station on the Nahe Valley Railway (Bingen–Saarbrücken).
