= Lauschied =

- Municipality
- Coat of arms

- Location of Lauschied within Bad Kreuznach district
- Interactive map of Lauschied
- Location within Germany Location within Rhineland-Palatinate
- Coordinates: 49°44′28″N 7°37′20″E
- Country: Germany
- State: Rhineland-Palatinate
- District: Bad Kreuznach
- Municipal assoc.: Nahe-Glan

Government
  - Mayor (2019–24): Wilhelm Marx

Area
  - Total: 4.78 km^{2} (1.85 sq mi)
- Elevation: 320 m (1,050 ft)

Population (2025-12-31)
  - Total: 523
  - Density: 109/km^{2} (283/sq mi)
- Time zone: UTC+01:00 (CET)
  - Summer (DST): UTC+02:00 (CEST)
- Postal codes: 55568
- Dialling codes: 06753
- Vehicle registration: KH
- Website: www.lauschied.de

Lauschied is an Ortsgemeinde – a municipality belonging to a Verbandsgemeinde, a kind of collective municipality – in the Bad Kreuznach district in Rhineland-Palatinate, Germany. It belongs to the Verbandsgemeinde Nahe-Glan.

== Geography ==
=== Location ===
Lauschied lies on a hill in the Glan-Nahe triangle, the wedge-shaped tongue of land where the former empties into the latter. It lies about 5 km south-southwest of Bad Sobernheim and 13 km east-southeast of Kirn.

=== Neighbouring municipalities ===
Clockwise from the north, Lauschied's neighbours are the municipality of Meddersheim, the town of Bad Sobernheim and the municipalities of Abtweiler, Raumbach (although it meets this at only one point), Desloch, Jeckenbach, Hundsbach and Bärweiler, all of which likewise lie within the Bad Kreuznach district.

== History ==
Investigations have shown that in the outlying cadastral areas now known as “In Frohnhausen” and “An den Pfühlen”, there are remnants of a Roman (2nd to 4th century AD) villa rustica. Like many other places with the name ending —schied (more often seen in the form —scheid), Lauschied arose as a new settlement in the area being cleared in the early 7th century. About 1200, Lauschied had its first documentary mention as Villam Lubescheid iuxa Mettersheim. Beginning in this time, the village was a fief from the lordship of Kirchheim-Bolanden held as a Ganerbenschaft (joint holding) among whose lords the Family Wolf von Sponheim was foremost. Also appearing in records besides them, though, were the Lords of Scharfenstein, Schenk of Schmidtburg and Ellenbach, in 1541. About this time, hunting rights were held by Disibodenberg Abbey. Against this right, the Abbey allowed the court lords in Lauschied lodging rights when they were hunting. In the 17th and 18th centuries, the Baron Boos von Waldeck, the Barons of Fürstenwärther and the Laittre de Feignies all had landholds in the village. After French Revolutionary and Napoleonic times (1794-1814), Lauschied belonged to the Hesse-Homburg Oberamt of Meisenheim, until this passed in 1866 to the Landgraviate of Hesse-Darmstadt. Later that same year, though, Lauschied once again found itself in a new country when it was ceded to the Kingdom of Prussia. In 1869, the Meisenheim district was founded, which in 1932 was transferred to the Kreuznach district. Until 31 October 1970, Lauschied belonged to the Amt – later Verbandsgemeinde – of Meisenheim. In the course of administrative restructuring in Rhineland-Palatinate, Lauschied was grouped into the Verbandsgemeinde of Sobernheim as of 1 November 1970 (the Verbandsgemeinde seat was not granted the distinction “Bad” until 1995).

=== Schinderhannes ===
Like many places in the region, Lauschied can claim to have had its dealings with the notorious outlaw Schinderhannes (or Johannes Bückler, to use his true name). In 1797 and 1798, Bückler, Germany's most famous robber, was staying in Lauschied. The cobbler Johannes Leyendecker from Lauschied is said to have been a crafty instigator of many of Schinderhannes's misdeeds. Indeed, Leyendecker may have been one of only a few of Schinderhannes's comrades who were as clever as he was, or perhaps even more so.

=== Population development ===
Lauschied's population development since Napoleonic times is shown in the table below. The figures for the years from 1871 to 1987 are drawn from census data:

Year	Inhabitants
1815	366
1835	N.A.
1871	539
1905	578
1939	634

Year	Inhabitants
1950	632
1961	677
1970	747
1987	680
2005	615

== Religion ==
As at 31 October 2013, there are 559 full-time residents in Lauschied, and of those, 158 are Evangelical (28.265%), 354 are Catholic (63.327%), 6 (1.073%) belong to other religious groups and 41 (7.335%) either have no religion or will not reveal their religious affiliation.

== Politics ==
=== Municipal council ===
The council is made up of 12 council members, who were elected by proportional representation at the municipal election held on 7 June 2009, and the honorary mayor as chairman. In the 2004 municipal election, council members were elected by majority vote. The municipal election held on 7 June 2009 yielded the following results:

Year	CDU	WGR	Total
2009	5	7	12 seats
2004	by majority vote		12 seats

=== Mayor ===
Lauschied's mayor is Wilhelm Marx.

=== Coat of arms ===
The German blazon reads: Schild geteilt und unten gespalten. Oben in Silber ein wachsender, schwarzer rotbewehrter Adler, unten vorn in Blau ein durchgehendes goldenes Kreuz, hinten blau-gold geschacht.

The municipality's arms might in English heraldic language be described thus: Per fess argent issuant from the line of partition an eagle displayed sable armed and langued gules, and per pale azure a cross Or and chequy of the fifth and fourth.

The three fields in Lauschied's arms symbolize the municipality's territorial history and are drawn from lordly arms once borne by Imperial knightly houses who had landholds in the village. Wolf von Sponheim bore arms chequy (a shield with a chequered pattern) with a black eagle, a charge now seen in the upper field. From an old 1700 seal comes Saint George’s attribute, a cross, who was the church's patron saint. The blue and gold chequy field is drawn from arms borne by the Lords of Koppenstein.

== Culture and sightseeing ==
=== Buildings ===
The following are listed buildings or sites in Rhineland-Palatinate’s Directory of Cultural Monuments:

- Evangelical church, Abtweilerstraße – Baroque aisleless church, 1731
- Saint George’s Catholic Church (Kirche St. Georg), Abtweilerstraße – Romanesquified aisleless church, 1875, architect Julius, Lauschied
- Abtweilerstraße 2 – town hall; plastered building with open Classicist entrance hall, firefighting room, earlier half of the 19th century (essentially older?)
- Abtweilerstraße 19 – Baroque timber-frame house, 17th or early 18th century
- At Abtweilerstraße 21 – armorial tablet at the former estate of the Family Wolf von Sponheim, marked 1631
- At Abtweilerstraße 22 – Baroque portal lintel with relief, marked 1720
- Abtweilerstraße 32 – Catholic rectory; sandstone-block building, pyramid roof, marked 1904/1905
- Meisenheimer Straße 18 – complex with single roof ridge; Gründerzeit sandstone-block building, marked 1881

== Economy and infrastructure ==
=== Transport ===
Lauschied lies within the Rhein-Nahe-Nahverkehrsverbund (RNN), whose fares therefore apply. The nearest railway station is Staudernheim on the Nahe Valley Railway (Bingen–Saarbrücken), 9 km northeast of Lauschied. Bus route 262 runs direct connections on weekdays to Bad Sobernheim station on the same line.
