= Hundsbach =

- Municipality
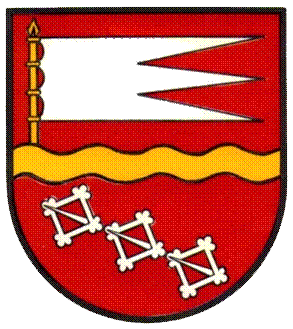
- Coat of arms

- Location of Hundsbach within Bad Kreuznach district
- Interactive map of Hundsbach
- Location within Germany Location within Rhineland-Palatinate
- Coordinates: 49°43′33″N 7°33′22″E
- Country: Germany
- State: Rhineland-Palatinate
- District: Bad Kreuznach
- Municipal assoc.: Nahe-Glan

Government
  - Mayor (2019–24): Jan Hey

Area
  - Total: 7.48 km^{2} (2.89 sq mi)
- Elevation: 345 m (1,132 ft)

Population (2025-12-31)
  - Total: 352
  - Density: 47.1/km^{2} (122/sq mi)
- Time zone: UTC+01:00 (CET)
  - Summer (DST): UTC+02:00 (CEST)
- Postal codes: 55621
- Dialling codes: 06757
- Vehicle registration: KH
- Website: www.hundsbach-rlp.de

Hundsbach is an Ortsgemeinde – a municipality belonging to a Verbandsgemeinde, a kind of collective municipality – in the Bad Kreuznach district in Rhineland-Palatinate, Germany. It belongs to the Verbandsgemeinde Nahe-Glan.

== Geography ==
=== Location ===
Hundsbach is a clump village that lies in the North Palatine Uplands. Its typical historical appearance as a rural village has been preserved.

=== Neighbouring municipalities ===
Clockwise from the north, Hundsbach's neighbours are the municipalities of Kirschroth, Bärweiler, Lauschied, Jeckenbach, Schweinschied and Limbach, all of which likewise lie within the Bad Kreuznach district.

=== Constituent communities ===
Also belonging to Hundsbach are the outlying homesteads of Forsthaus Hundsbach and Lochmühle.

=== Climate ===
Yearly precipitation in Hundsbach amounts to 590 mm, which is very low, falling into the lowest fourth of the precipitation chart for all Germany. Only 19% of the German Weather Service's weather stations are even lower figures recorded. The driest month is February. The most rainfall comes in May. In that month, precipitation is 1.6 times what it is in February. Precipitation varies only slightly and is spread quite evenly over the year. At only 1% of the weather stations are lower seasonal swings recorded.

== History ==
Hundsbach is found on an old Roman road that led from the Rhine Valley to Metz. The village, mentioned in old records as Hundisbach had for a while in the Middle Ages two centres, Oberhundsbach and Niederhundsbach (“Upper” and “Nether”). By 1611, however, Hundsbach had been given up, and this even before the ravages of the Thirty Years' War (1618—1648). Hundsbach belonged to the County of Veldenz, and as of 1386 to the Waldgraves. From 1816 to 1866 it belonged to the Oberamt of Meisenheim in the Landgraviate of Hesse-Homburg, passing with this state in 1866 to the Kingdom of Prussia. Late in the Second World War, Hundsbach was almost utterly destroyed.

=== Jewish history ===
Hundsbach had a Jewish community in the 19th century. It arose in the 18th century. In the 19th century, the number of Jewish inhabitants developed as follows: in 1808, 40 Jewish inhabitants; in 1867, 22 (of all together 688 inhabitants); in 1895, 21. About 1870, known Jewish family heads were Moses Haas, Ludwig Winer, Abraham Leiser and Jakob Adler, who were all merchants whose existence is confirmed in this year by their registration at the Sobernheim Amt court as the Jewish graveyard's owners. All together, documents are still available from the registry office and the municipal books witnessing 18 Jewish families in Hundsbach in the earlier half of the 19th century (until about 1870):

1. David Heymann (1772-1855) with wife Eva née Wolf (1775-1838) and eight children
2. Samuel Heymann (1731-18??), widower
3. David Leiser (1774-1842) with wife Veronika née Max (1776-1839) and two children
4. Abraham Leiser (1765-1841) with wife Judith (1773-1850) and six children
5. Jacob Marx (1795-1848) with wife Klara née Seligmann (1789-?) and three children
6. Veronika née Daniel (1749-1827), widow of David Seligmann and two children
7. Isaak Haas (1778-18??) and first wife Esther as well as second wife Sara and together from both marriages five children
8. Gumpel Frenckel (late) and four children
9. Nathan Schiff (1788-1831) with wife Sara née Leiser (1801-1874) and three children; Sara Leiser married Moises Wiener in a second marriage
10. Joseph Leyser (1798-1864) with wife Philippina Schwarzschild from Gaugrehweiler (1808-1868) and eight children
11. Wolfgang Heymann (1803-1859) and first wife Johannetta née Feist (1808-1836), second wife Henriette née Wolf (1806-1858) and third wife Fanny née Strauß (1821-1883) and together from all marriages eleven children
12. Moises Wiener (1799-1841) with wife Sara née Leiser (1801-1874)
13. Marcus Leiser (1804-?, shochet) with wife Eva née Böhm and two children
14. Aaron Haas (1811-1875, locksmith) and first wife Rosetta née Haas (1812-1849), second wife Sara née Stern (1812-185?) and together from both marriages four children
15. Marx Leyser (1815-?, emigrated to the United States) with wife Theresia née Herz (1819-?) and one son
16. Ludwig Leyser (1840-?) with wife Theresia née Lahn (1842-?) and five children
17. Ludwig Wiener (1836-?) with wife Karolina née Levi (1841-?) and five children
18. Moses Haas (1844-?) with wife Johanetta née Rothschild from Ulmet (1869-?) and three children

In the way of institutions, there were a synagogue (see Former synagogue below), a Jewish school, a mikveh and a graveyard. To provide for the community's religious needs, a schoolteacher was hired for a time, who also busied himself as the hazzan (and the shochet?). The community belonged to the Rabbinate of Meisenheim. The Jews living in Becherbach bei Kirn, Bärweiler, Schweinschied, Löllbach and Hoppstädten formed outlying parts of this Jewish community. In 1807, the following Jewish families were living in these villages (firm family names had not yet been adopted): in Bärweiler Loeb Jacob, Lasar Levy, Moyses Jacob and Seuve Gurnberg; in Schweinschied Joseph Nathan, Jacob Salomon, Susel Salomon, Isaac Abraham and Jacob Aaron; in Löllbach Herz Nathan, Jacob Wolff and Daniel Cahen. In 1867, there were 18 Jewish inhabitants in Becherbach bei Kirn, 13 in Bärweiler, 8 in Schweinschied, 6 in Löllbach and 4 in Hoppstädten. Löllbach also had its own Jewish graveyard. About 1924, four more families belonged to the Jewish community in Hundsbach (family names Blum, Adler and Leiser). Still living then in Hundsbach were ten Jewish inhabitants. Some of them left the village in the years after 1933, the year when Adolf Hitler and the Nazis seized power in Germany, though, some of the Jews moved away or emigrated in the face of the boycotting of their businesses, the progressive stripping of their rights and repression, all brought about by the Nazis. According to Yad Vashem’s lists and information from the work Gedenkbuch - Opfer der Verfolgung der Juden unter der nationalsozialistischen Gewaltherrschaft in Deutschland 1933-1945 ("Memorial Book – Victims of the Persecution of Jews under the National Socialist Tyranny in Germany 1933-1945"), the following members of Hundsbach's Jewish community fell victim to the Holocaust (along with their birth years):

- Bertha Bär née Frenkel (1880)
- Rosa Frenkel (1883)
- Erna Leiser (1900)

There were also two others from Schweinschied, who had since moved to Frankfurt:

- Lina Adler (1871)
- Martha Becker née Adler (1885)

== Religion ==
As at 30 September 2013, there are 390 full-time residents in Hundsbach, and of those, 308 are Evangelical (78.974%), 53 are Catholic (13.59%), and 29 (7.436%) either have no religion or will not reveal their religious affiliation.

== Politics ==
=== Municipal council ===
The council is made up of 8 council members, who were elected by majority vote at the municipal election held on 8 June 2009, and the honorary mayor as chairman.

=== Mayor ===
Hundsbach's mayor is Jan Hey.

=== Coat of arms ===
The German blazon reads: In rotem, durch goldenen Wellenbalken geteilten Schild, oben am goldenen Schaft eine dreiläntzige, silberne Sturmfahne, unten drei silberne schrägrechtsgestellte Gürtelschnallen.

The municipality's arms might in English heraldic language be described thus: Gules a closet wavy Or issuant from which to dexter a staff of the same bearing a standard with three streamers flying to sinister argent, below the closet three arming buckles bottony in bend of the last.

== Culture and sightseeing ==
=== Buildings ===
The following are listed buildings or sites in Rhineland-Palatinate’s Directory of Cultural Monuments:

- Evangelical church, Hauptstraße 7 – Romanesque Revival sandstone-block building, 1867, after 1945 reconstruction; retaining wall, sandstone-block; warriors’ memorial 1914-1918
- Hauptstraße 3 – former school; Late Classicist building with hip roof, mid 19th century
- Hauptstraße 12 – former inn; in the style of a complex with a single roof ridge with a dance hall, marked 1830, timber-frame addition
- Untergasse 4 – former Evangelical rectory; Late Classicist plastered building, late 19th century
- Near Untergasse 9 – former synagogue; sandstone-block building with Rundbogenstil motifs, 1880 (see also below)
- Jewish graveyard “Am Judenkirchhof” (monumental zone) – area with some 50 gravestones from the 18th and 19th centuries (see also below)

=== Former synagogue ===
At first, the Jewish community likely had to make do with a simple prayer room that had been set up in one of the Jewish houses. No later than 1866, though, there was a synagogue on Untergasse (a lane). This is known from a report from that year about a fire there, which damaged the building. In 1880, another fire broke out at the property next door causing such great damage that a new building had to be built. On 26 August 1881, the new synagogue building was consecrated. The village chronicle reported the celebration, in which “the district chairman, among others, took part... [as did] the representatives of the municipality of Hundsbach and the district rabbi, who gave an uplifting speech in the house, which was filled by the crowd.” How long regular services were held at the synagogue is unknown. Possibly as early as the turn of the 20th century, and no later than the time of the First World War, Jews from Hundsbach were attending services in Sien. On 7 July 1930, the synagogue, with its yard and school (195 m^{2}), was sold to a farmer named Frenger, who used the building for storage. On Kristallnacht (9–10 November 1938), Brownshirts from Meisenheim supposedly destroyed the synagogue, but there is oral history in Hundsbach that holds that the destruction was actually undertaken by private citizens from the village itself. It could be that the SA had been made aware that for eight years, the building had no longer been under Jewish ownership. After 1945, the building was used as the local Raiffeisen storehouse. In 1987, the building was placed under monumental protection. In the 1990s, the building was restored and was tended by those charged with the care of monuments. Since then, it has been used as a house.

=== Jewish graveyard ===
The Jewish graveyard in Hundsbach was laid out in the late 17th or early 18th century and is among the district's oldest. The gravestones can be found towards the graveyard's lower end; many are heavily weathered. The graveyard has an area of 1 159 m^{2}. It is easily visible on a hill roughly one kilometre east of Hundsbach (“Am Judenkirchhof”), some 400 m from the road that leads from Kirn to Meisenheim. Coming from Hundsbach, it can be made out on the heights to the right of the road and can be reached along a farm lane.

== Economy and infrastructure ==
=== Transport ===
Running through Hundsbach is Landesstraße 182, which links to Bundesstraße 420 at Meisenheim to the southeast. In the other direction, the road leads to Becherbach bei Kirn and then Kirn itself, where it links with Bundesstraße 41. Landesstraße 182 also has a junction with Landesstraße 374 just before Becherbach bei Kirn, which leads to Bundesstraße 270 at Sien. Serving Kirn is a railway station on the Nahe Valley Railway (Bingen–Saarbrücken).
