= Nahe-Glan =

- Verbandsgemeinde
- Location of Nahe-Glan within Bad Kreuznach district
- Interactive map of Nahe-Glan
- Location within Germany Location within Rhineland-Palatinate
- Coordinates: 49°47′N 7°39′E
- Country: Germany
- State: Rhineland-Palatinate
- District: Bad Kreuznach
- Seat: Bad Sobernheim
- Subdivisions: 34 municipalities

Area
  - Total: 273.9 km^{2} (105.8 sq mi)

Population (2025-12-31)
  - Total: 25,099
  - Density: 91.64/km^{2} (237.3/sq mi)
- Time zone: UTC+01:00 (CET)
  - Summer (DST): UTC+02:00 (CEST)
- Website: vg-nahe-glan.de

Nahe-Glan is a Verbandsgemeinde ("collective municipality") in the district of Bad Kreuznach, Rhineland-Palatinate, Germany. The seat of the Verbandsgemeinde is in Bad Sobernheim. It was formed on 1 January 2020 by the merger of the former Verbandsgemeinden Bad Sobernheim and Meisenheim.

The Verbandsgemeinde Nahe-Glan consists of the following Ortsgemeinden ("local municipalities"):

1. Abtweiler
2. Auen
3. Bad Sobernheim
4. Bärweiler
5. Becherbach
6. Breitenheim
7. Callbach
8. Daubach
9. Desloch
10. Hundsbach
11. Ippenschied
12. Jeckenbach
13. Kirschroth
14. Langenthal
15. Lauschied
16. Lettweiler
17. Löllbach
18. Martinstein
19. Meddersheim
20. Meisenheim
21. Merxheim
22. Monzingen
23. Nußbaum
24. Odernheim am Glan
25. Raumbach
26. Rehbach
27. Rehborn
28. Reiffelbach
29. Schmittweiler
30. Schweinschied
31. Seesbach
32. Staudernheim
33. Weiler bei Monzingen
34. Winterburg
