= Breitenheim =

- Municipality
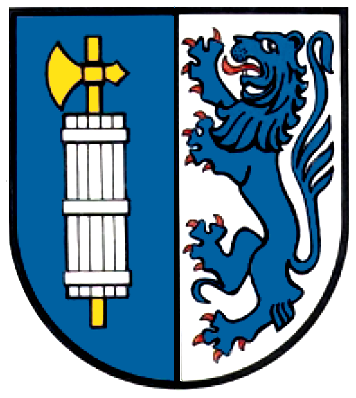
- Coat of arms

- Location of Breitenheim within Bad Kreuznach district
- Interactive map of Breitenheim
- Location within Germany Location within Rhineland-Palatinate
- Coordinates: 49°41′50″N 7°37′50″E
- Country: Germany
- State: Rhineland-Palatinate
- District: Bad Kreuznach
- Municipal assoc.: Nahe-Glan

Government
  - Mayor (2019–24): Michael Westenberger

Area
  - Total: 5.69 km^{2} (2.20 sq mi)
- Elevation: 165 m (541 ft)

Population (2025-12-31)
  - Total: 387
  - Density: 68.0/km^{2} (176/sq mi)
- Time zone: UTC+01:00 (CET)
  - Summer (DST): UTC+02:00 (CEST)
- Postal codes: 55592
- Dialling codes: 06753
- Vehicle registration: KH
- Website: www.breitenheim.de

Breitenheim is an Ortsgemeinde – a municipality belonging to a Verbandsgemeinde, a kind of collective municipality – in the Bad Kreuznach district in Rhineland-Palatinate, Germany. It belongs to the Verbandsgemeinde Nahe-Glan.

== Geography ==
=== Location ===
Breitenheim, a linear village (by some definitions, a “thorpe”), lies in the North Palatine Uplands in a side dale to the Glan. The municipal area measures 569 ha.

=== Neighbouring municipalities ===
Clockwise from the north, Breitenheim's neighbours are the municipality of Desloch, the town of Meisenheim, the municipality of Odenbach, the municipality of Medard (both in the neighbouring Kusel district), the municipality of Löllbach and the municipality of Jeckenbach.

=== Constituent communities ===
Also belonging to Breitenheim is the outlying homestead of Lacher Hof.

=== Climate ===
Yearly precipitation in Breitenheim amounts to 747 mm, which falls into the middle third of the precipitation chart for all Germany. At 51% of the German Weather Service's weather stations, lower figures are recorded. The driest month is February. The most rainfall comes in June. In that month, precipitation is 1.6 times what it is in February. Precipitation varies hardly at all. At only 7% of the weather stations are lower seasonal swings recorded.

== History ==
In 1387, Breitenheim belonged administratively to the seat of the Counts of Veldenz, Meisenheim, and passed in 1444 by inheritance to Stephen, Count Palatine of Simmern-Zweibrücken, remaining with his line until 1793, when French Revolutionary – later Napoleonic French – occupation began. After the Wars of Liberation, the Oberamt – later district – of Meisenheim passed on 1 September 1816, under the terms of the Congress of Vienna to the lordship of the Counts of Hesse-Homburg. After the 1866 Austro-Prussian War, the Landgraviate of Hesse-Homburg was annexed by the Kingdom of Prussia and incorporated as a district into the Regierungsbezirk of Koblenz. The district of Meisenheim was dissolved on 1 October 1932, and Breitenheim has belonged to the district of Bad Kreuznach ever since.

=== Archaeology ===
In June 1997, during excavation work for a new barn west of Breitenheim, there was an utterly unexpected discovery when some foundation remnants of an obviously very old building were unearthed. Thanks to builder Wolff's thoughtfulness and interest in history, knowledge of this find reached the state archaeologists in Mainz who were responsible for such things by way of Karen Groß of the Meisenheim Historical Club. During a promptly undertaken survey of the village, the ruin was recognized as Roman and it was decided to undertake an immediate dig. This was, however, only possible with the family Wolff's and Mrs. Groß's courtesy and support once again. Over a fortnight, a team from the Archäologische Landesdenkmalpflege (State Archaeological Monument Care), Mainz office, sometimes thwarted by rain, dug the building's remnants up. Under local excavation engineer Klaus Soukop's leadership, six young men, most doing alternative civilian service but one a “freelancer”, pealed back the layers of earth to bring the old foundations to light. A whole variety of equipment was deployed, everything from a compact excavator to a trowel. The goal was to make every trace of the building visible to learn as much as could be learnt about its size, possible conversions, the rooms’ functions and the building technique. In the next step of the work, the whole site was photographed, drawn to scale and described – requirements for scientific analysis. After one week came the careful burial work – the site was not left exposed – so that as planned, the barn could be built. In the coming years – with the family Wolff's permission – the further parts of the building are to be unearthed, which will make Breitenheim the only place within a great distance to have the footprint of a Roman villa rustica that has been so completely excavated. Hitherto, only a few carved stones with ornamental and figural decoration, set into the walls at Breitenheim's church, had made it clear that what is now Breitenheim was settled even as far back as Roman times. As parts of old tombs, these stones also indirectly bear witness to a villa rustica. In 1997, this was finally found, between the Jeckenbach and the Bollerbübchen. A Roman villa rustica – Latin for “country estate” – was made up of a main building, which was the dwelling, and several outbuildings, namely a barn, a stable, a shed, servants’ quarters and so on. Such estates are known to have lain within very nearly every municipality in the district of Bad Kreuznach and neighbouring regions. Back in Roman times, villages, as the word is understood now, did not yet exist. Beginning in the 1st century AD, sometimes together with native Celtic timber-frame buildings, these country estates characterized the land for four centuries. Agricultural goods were produced here not only for the occupants’ own needs, but also for the main towns in the region, towns now called Bad Kreuznach, Alzey, Bingen, Mainz, Worms and Trier, among others. Rising from stone foundations were plastered stone and timber-frame buildings with several floors, tiled roofs and glazed windows. Inside were frescoed floors, sometimes mosaics, a hypocaust, painted walls and wooden-beam or vaulted ceilings, sometimes stuccoed. Lockable wooden doors inside and leading outside afforded access to the rooms and joined them together. The façade was often impressively shaped with a colonnade over the entrance. A heated bathing facility was part of a villa rustica's basic appointments as surely as running water from the nearest spring. Removed somewhat from the main building but still within sight lay the private graveyard with gravestones or even optically pleasing grave monuments. The villa rustica was always linked to the well developed road network, and the next villa rustica along the road often lay only about a kilometre away. Discharged soldiers lived here, but mainly it was the newly wealthy native Celtic populace, who gladly adopted the Roman way of life and the things that Roman civilization had to offer. By the 4th century, though, or at the latest the 5th, this era of high living ended, and the Middle Ages announced their onset with the waves of migration that involved so much of Europe. The local area was then characterized more by Germanic peoples such as the Alemanni and the Franks.

== Religion ==
As at 31 August 2013, there are 404 full-time residents in Breitenheim, and of those, 314 are Evangelical (77.723%), 46 are Catholic (11.386%) and 44 (10.891%) either have no religion or will not reveal their religious affiliation. Breitenheim's church stands in the village's south end. It is made up of a very old chapel that was expanded in 1912 with a new addition.

== Politics ==
=== Municipal council ===
The council is made up of 8 council members, who were elected by majority vote at the municipal election held on 7 June 2009, and the honorary mayor as chairman.

=== Mayor ===
Breitenheim's mayor is Michael Westenberger.

=== Coat of arms ===
The municipality's arms might be described thus: Per pale azure a fasces argent, the axe Or and argent a lion rampant of the first armed and langued gules.

Breitenheim's founding goes back to the time of the Frankish land expansion and it was originally named Breidenau. The village belonged to the County of Veldenz, and this is recalled by the charge on the sinister (armsbearer's left, viewer's right) side, the blue lion on a silver field. Within the municipality's limits, parts of a Roman tomb have been found, as has a whole villa rustica site. This Roman past is reflected by the charge on the dexter (armsbearer's right, viewer's left) side, the fasces, an ancient Roman symbol of authority. The tinctures are the ones formerly borne by the Counts of Veldenz.

== Culture and sightseeing ==
=== Buildings ===
The following are listed buildings or sites in Rhineland-Palatinate’s Directory of Cultural Monuments:

- Evangelical church, Kirchstraße 103 – Historicized aisleless church, Heimatstil, 1912, District Master Builder Damm, Late Gothic quire; Roman sandstone reliefs
- Hauptstraße 61 – former schoolteacher’s house; villalike building with hipped mansard roof, Heimatstil, about 1910

=== Clubs ===
The following clubs are active in Breitenheim:

- Angel- und Naturschutzverein Breitenheim 1981 e.V. — angling and conservation
- Förderverein “Pro Breitenheim e.V.” — promotional association
- Freiwillige Feuerwehr — volunteer fire brigade
- Freunde und Förderer der Feuerwehr Breitenheim e.V. — “Friends and Promoters of the Breitenheim Fire Brigade
- Landfrauenverein e.V. — countrywomen’s club
- MGV 1875 e.V. — men’s singing club
- Motorradclub Breitenheim — motorcycle club
- Rotes Kreuz — German Red Cross
- TuS Breitenheim 1921 e.V. — gymnastic and sport club

== Economy and infrastructure ==
=== Transport ===
To the east runs Bundesstraße 420. Serving Staudernheim is a railway station on the Nahe Valley Railway (Bingen–Saarbrücken).
