= Gedenkbuch =

Memorial book of Holocaust victims

The Gedenkbuch – Opfer der Verfolgung der Juden unter der nationalsozialistischen Gewaltherrschaft 1933–1945 ("Memorial Book – Victims of the Persecution of Jews under the National Socialist Tyranny in Germany 1933–1945") is a memorial book published by the German Federal Archives, listing persons murdered during the Holocaust as part of the Nazis' so-called "Final Solution". It is limited to people, regardless of nationality, who voluntarily lived within the borders of the German Reich as of December 31, 1937. Since 2007, it has been available online. As of February 2020, it contained 176,475 names. Alongside the Arolsen Archives and Yad Vashem's central database, it is considered an important resource for Holocaust research. Since its publication, many cities and states have published their own memorial books, complementing and expanding on the Gedenkbuch.

== History ==
In 1960, upon request from Yad Vashem, the Federal Ministry of the Interior issued a letter instructing state and local governments to begin collecting records about their former Jewish populations. The German Federal Archives needed 25 years to complete the "immense task" of compiling and reviewing this data.

The first edition of the Gedenkbuch was published in 1986 in two volumes, prepared by the German Federal Archives in Koblenz, and the Arolsen Archives, in Bad Arolsen, Germany. This edition contained approximately 128,000 names and listed victims who had lived in the parts of the German Reich that became West Germany, along with both East and West Berlin. East Germany declined to participate in this project.

After the end of the Cold War, researchers gained access to a large amount of archival material located in former East Germany and other former eastern territories of Germany. This data was incorporated into a considerably expanded second edition of the Gedenkbuch, which was published in 2006 in four volumes, edited and published by the German Federal Archives. The second edition included victims who had lived within the 1937 borders of the German Reich, with a total of approximately 149,600 names.

Since December 2007, the Gedenkbuch has been available online; the German Federal Archives continuously publishes additions and corrections based on research and submissions.

Dieses Gedenkbuch gibt den Ermordeten ihren Namen und damit ihre Menschenwürde wieder. Es ist zugleich ein Denkmal und eine Erinnerung daran, dass jedes einzelne Menschenleben einen Namen und eine einzigartige Geschichte hat.
This memorial book gives the murdered their names and thus their human dignity back. It is both a memorial and a reminder that every single human life has a name and a unique story.

—Preface to the second edition, written by president of Germany Horst Köhler

=== Online edition ===
The core of the online edition is a searchable directory of names. It also contains a detailed chronology of deportations, and a bibliography.

In 2021, the Gedenkbuch was relaunched with a new interface and additional features.
