= Desloch =

- Municipality
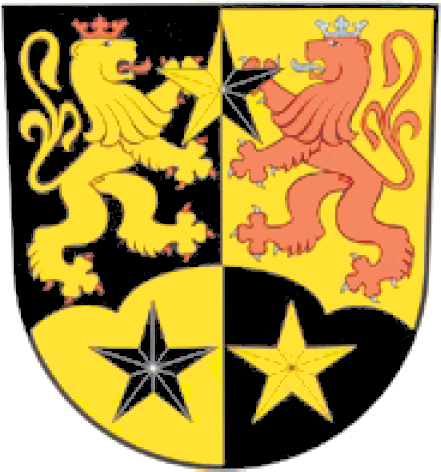
- Coat of arms

- Location of Desloch within Bad Kreuznach district
- Interactive map of Desloch
- Location within Germany Location within Rhineland-Palatinate
- Coordinates: 49°43′07″N 7°37′45″E
- Country: Germany
- State: Rhineland-Palatinate
- District: Bad Kreuznach
- Municipal assoc.: Nahe-Glan

Government
  - Mayor (2019–24): Udo Reidenbach

Area
  - Total: 6.37 km^{2} (2.46 sq mi)
- Elevation: 285 m (935 ft)

Population (2025-12-31)
  - Total: 305
  - Density: 47.9/km^{2} (124/sq mi)
- Time zone: UTC+01:00 (CET)
  - Summer (DST): UTC+02:00 (CEST)
- Postal codes: 55592
- Dialling codes: 06753
- Vehicle registration: KH

Desloch is an Ortsgemeinde – a municipality belonging to a Verbandsgemeinde, a kind of collective municipality – in the Bad Kreuznach district in Rhineland-Palatinate, Germany. It belongs to the Verbandsgemeinde Nahe-Glan. Desloch is a farming and winegrowing village.

== Geography ==
=== Location ===
Desloch is a linear village (by some definitions, a “thorpe”) lying 3 km northwest of Meisenheim on the Glan at the north edge of the North Palatine Uplands, Germany. The municipal area measures 637 ha, of which 129 ha is wooded. Desloch lies on an old Roman road between the Nahe and the Glan.

=== Neighbouring municipalities ===
Clockwise from the north, Desloch's neighbours are the municipality of Lauschied, the municipality of Abtweiler (at a single point only), the municipality of Raumbach, the town of Meisenheim, the municipality of Breitenheim and the municipality of Jeckenbach.

=== Constituent communities ===
Also belonging to Desloch is the outlying homestead of Neuwieser Hof.

== History ==
The village's name is of Celtic origin, meaning “pool at the mountain”. As long ago as 400 BC, Celts were living on the heights around what is now Desloch. Over the centuries that followed, these Celts were supplanted by Germanic peoples who thrust their way from the Rhine’s right bank into the lands on the left bank only sporadically. From 50 BC to AD 450 – fully 500 years – the Romans held sway in the region, for a time even under Emperor Augustus. With the onset of the Migration Period and Rome’s downfall, the Romans vanished from the land. For a short time, Germanic tribes dwelt in the region before having to give way to the Franks, who founded new villages and farms, worked very hard, and were the lords at all the estates. It was in Frankish times, the time of the widespread woodland clearing, that the name Desloch – earlier called Tageslach, and then Denslach – arose. In 1184, Desloch had its first documentary mention. It had its beginnings in a monastic complex that was a branch of Disibodenberg Abbey. Desloch was in the Early Middle Ages the seat of a high court of the Waldgraves and the Counts Palatine. Even today, the local speech refers to the place before the church as Auf der Linde (“At the Limetree”). This was where the court sat. An old stone still recalls this today. In the Thirty Years' War, Desloch was laid waste together with its church, which stood on the same spot as today's church. The wooden chapel that had stood in the beginning was replaced with a sturdier church in 1570. This was the one that was destroyed, and a new one arose in its stead only in 1751. It still looms over the village today. In the 16th century, Desloch, which hitherto had belonged to the Waldgraves and Rhinegraves at Kyrburg since 1128, was acquired through marriage by the Counts Palatine of Zweibrücken, who then annexed it to Meisenheim. After the Thirty Years' War, the Count Palatine of Zweibrücken organized some immigration for the now depopulated region, bringing people from the Tyrol, Switzerland, Italy, France and Holland to settle the land. Under King Louis XIV, the region was French from 1684 to 1697, and later became French a second time in French Revolutionary times and the Napoleonic Era that followed, from 1795 to 1815. In Frederick the Great’s time (18th century), many peasants emigrated to Pomerania and Lithuania. In 1823, many people emigrated to Brazil, whereas from 1837 to 1860 the destination was North America. From 1782 to 1785, there was a mass emigration to Galicia and Bačka in the Kingdom of Hungary (although most of Bačka now lies within Serbia). After the German campaign in the Napoleonic Wars, Desloch, together with the rest of the region south of the Nahe, passed as the Oberamt of Meisenheim to the Landgraves of Hesse-Homburg, to whom the village and region belonged for 50 years before passing in 1866 first to the Grand Duchy of Hesse and then, later that same year, to the Kingdom of Prussia. Thereafter, the village lived through the glory of the German Empire’s rise in 1870 and 1871 and the ignominy of defeat in both the First World War (1914-1918) and the Second World War (1939-1945). Both world wars exacted their toll on Desloch: in all, 55 men fell. Since the Second World War, the villagers have been working hard to beautify their village, winning several distinctions in the contest Unser Dorf soll schöner werden (“Our village should become lovelier”): first place at the district level in 1962; the same in both 1963 and 1964 but in the special class; first place at the regional level in 1964, and also the silver badge at the state level.

== Religion ==
As at 31 August 2013, there are 363 full-time residents in Desloch, and of those, 292 are Evangelical (80.441%), 28 are Catholic (7.713%), 1 (0.275%) belongs to another religious group and 42 (11.57%) either have no religion or will not reveal their religious affiliation.

== Politics ==
=== Municipal council ===
The council is made up of 8 council members, who were elected by majority vote at the municipal election held on 7 June 2009, and the honorary mayor as chairman.

=== Mayor ===
Desloch's mayor is Udo Reidenbach.

=== Coat of arms ===
The German blazon reads: Gespalten von Schwarz und Gold über einem Dreiberg in vertauschten Farben, darin vorne ein schwarzer, hinten ein goldener fünffstrahliger Stern. Oben zwei einander zugewandte Löwen, einen fünfstrahligen Stern in der mitte in vertauschten Farben haltend. Vorne der Löwe gold, rotbewehrt und gekrönt, hinten der Löwe rot, blaubewehrt und gekrönt.

The municipality's arms might in English heraldic language be described thus: Per pale sable and Or a trimount counterchanged charged with two mullets of five in fess, each of the field, and upon which lions combatant, the dexter of the second armed, langued and crowned gules, the sinister of the third armed, langued and crowned azure, between their paws a mullet of five counterchanged.

Known to history are two former local lordships: the Waldgraves and Palatinate-Zweibrücken. Both bore the lion as an heraldic device, the Waldgraves a red one on a gold field, seen in Desloch's arms as the charge on the sinister (armsbearer's left, viewer's right) side, and the Counts Palatine of Zweibrücken a gold one on a black field, seen here as the charge on the dexter (armsbearer's right, viewer's left) side, although in Desloch's arms, he has been turned round to become “sinister” (facing heraldic left) so that the two lion charges in the arms are “combatant”. There was a happy circumstance with these arms insofar as, unlike many other coats of arms, this one actually obeys the rule of tincture. To distinguish Desloch's arms from Alsenz’s, which are similar, the village’s location was also considered. Desloch lies in a high dale, and at night can only be seen by stars. Thus, the two lions in the arms hold a star (“mullet of five” in blazon), while two others appear on the trimount to fill in what would otherwise be empty space. The tinctures used in Desloch's arms are drawn from those formerly borne by the Waldgraves and the Counts Palatine of Zweibrücken. The arms have been borne since 2003.

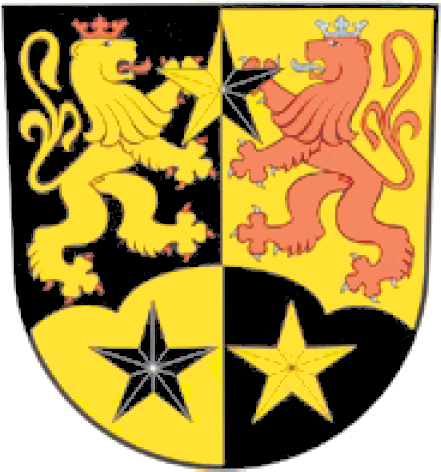
Desloch's arms

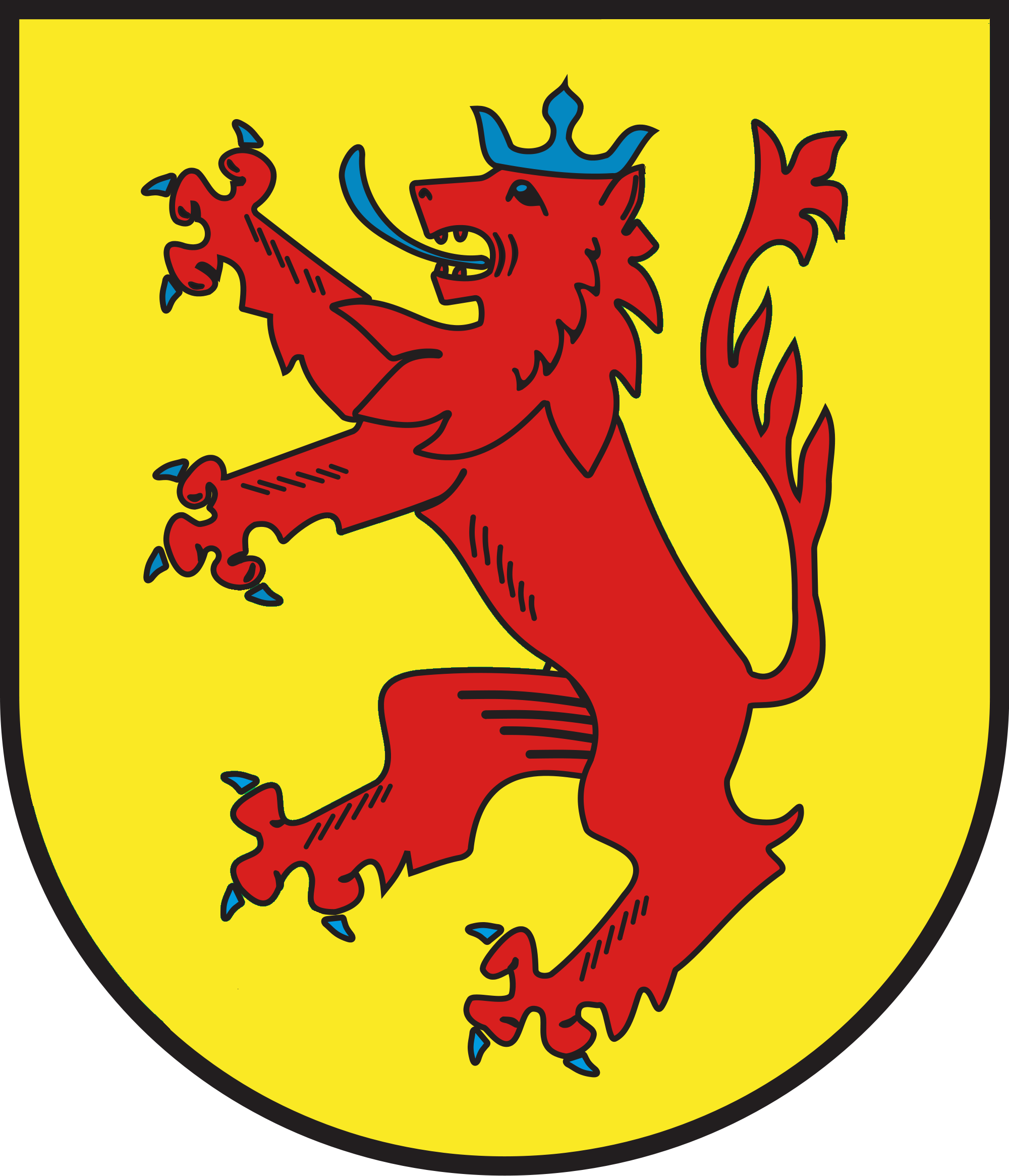
Waldgravial arms

Palatinate-Zweibrücken's arms

Alsenz's “similar” arms

== Culture and sightseeing ==
=== Buildings ===
The following are listed buildings or sites in Rhineland-Palatinate’s Directory of Cultural Monuments:

- Evangelical church, Hauptstraße – Baroque aisleless church, marked 1751, tower made taller in 1857 (see also below)
- Hauptstraße 43 – former school, Late Classicist plastered building, mid 19th century
- Neuwieser Straße 6 – Baroque timber-frame house, plastered, 18th century
- Schulstraße 9 – Late Classicist house with single roof ridge, quarrystone, marked 1869

==== More about the church ====
The Desloch church, aligned towards the north, lies somewhat hidden on the main road going towards Jeckenbach. Shortly before reaching the former schoolhouse, one reaches, by way of a small stairway and then under two old lime trees, the way into the churchyard. In earlier times, the churchyard was Desloch's graveyard, but after 1833, when a new graveyard was laid out on the village's northeastern outskirts, it was used by the neighbouring school as an exercise yard and schoolyard. Anyone entering the church itself through the entrance on the east side is surprised and impressed by the unexpected wealth of artistic creativity that has gone into the windows and visual art inside. Information about the former church that once stood on this same spot, renovated in 1663/1664 and torn down in 1747, comes from a plan dating from the year of its demolition. It was a right-angled, two-naved building aligned east-west with a three-sided quire at the east end of the north nave, and a tower abutting it at the east end of the south nave. The church that stands today is a simpler building aligned towards the north with a three-sided quire onto which a hefty tower, which was made taller in 1857, is joined, and whose lower level may well go back to a mediaeval defensive tower. After the interior renovation in 1959, the inside of the church changed markedly, in three phases. The former eastern gallery was removed, thus making considerably more room inside the church. The whole quire was newly created. The altar, the baptismal font, the 18th-century pulpit, the carved confessional, believed to have been similar to the one at the Evangelical church in Staudernheim, and the choir bench behind the altar but within the congregation's sight all fell victim to the renovation work. The appointments in the church, with a small pulpit on a sandstone pedestal, a plain altar table and a stand for a baptismal bowl with a brass lid, all made of wood, had a rather humble look to them. The same went for the plain positive organ made by the firm Oberlinger that in the 1960s replaced the imposing organ that had unfortunately become unusable. The Desloch church's plain and cold-looking interior décor motivated Manfred Herzhoff, then the pastor, to contact his friend Vilmo Gibello in the late 1970s. Gibello was a painter from Italy, although he now lived in England. He was born on 23 November 1916 in Occhieppo Superiore in northern Italy's Piedmont region. It was said of him that he bore the love of God within himself. This love for God may well have been the cause of Vilmo Gibello's decision to give a church an artistic makeover as praise to God after having travelled through Siberia and seen the many destroyed churches there. The Reverend Manfred Herzhoff arranged for the room in the Desloch Evangelical church that Vilmo Gibello sought for his work, and also put the municipality in touch with his artist friend. After visiting the church, Gibello produced the pictures in England. The municipal bus was then used to bring these pictures to Desloch, where they were framed and placed. The sequence of the pictures alone defined optical aspects. The three glass windows, which each have an especially impressive effect on the observer according to how the sun shines through them, were made in Desloch at the nearby schoolhouse, which was made available to Vilmo Gibello for the duration of his stay as both a lodging and a studio. On 17 May 1981, the “oil paintings created on wooden tables and the stained glass designed on new indoor windows – united into a cycle of Biblical motifs from Creation to Revelation, the end of the world” were presented to the congregation during a church service. As for the artist himself, he is spending his twilight years at his house near Málaga in southern Spain’s Andalusia, and despite his great age, he still creates, making the proceeds of any sale of his artworks available to charitable bodies. The church is nowadays used on Sundays, alternating between regular church services and children’s church services, by the Jeckenbach Evangelical community, which was formed on 1 July 1972 out of the formerly separate communities of Desloch and Jeckenbach. Under the church’s roof, the grey long-eared bat (Plecotus austriacus), a species of bat indigenous to the Nahe region but threatened with extinction (at least locally; it is otherwise a Least Concern species), has made its summer home – and its nursery roost – for years.

=== Wells ===
Anybody who is willing to walk in the Romans’ footsteps over the Desloch Heights towards Jeckenbach will find the Römerbrunnen, or “Roman Well”. Lying just inside neighbouring Jeckenbach's limits, this is an ancient scoop well complex that served Roman troops as a resting place, as this spot lay right on a Roman road that led across the heights. In the middle of the village itself is found the well at the fire pond. The well was built in the course of laying the sewerage at the square where the former fire pond once lay, sometime in the 20th century. The former fire pond, as the name suggests (it is called the Brandweiher in German, with the same literal meaning), was used on the one hand by the Desloch fire brigade as a reservoir in case of fire. On the other hand, it was from days of yore also a central gathering place for the villagers. There is a group in the village that stages the Brunnenfest (“well festival”) each year.

=== Sport and leisure ===
For children, Desloch has a playground with a variety of playground equipment. Anybody wishing to take a hike around Desloch can contact the municipality to arrange a guided hike.

== Economy and infrastructure ==
=== Transport ===
Running to Desloch's east is Bundesstraße 420. Serving Staudernheim is a railway station on the Nahe Valley Railway (Bingen–Saarbrücken).

=== Public institutions ===
Desloch's community centre underwent a conversion in the 1980s. Now, it will soon be undergoing renovation work.
