= Bad Sobernheim station =

Railway station in Bad Sobernheim, Germany

Bad Sobernheim
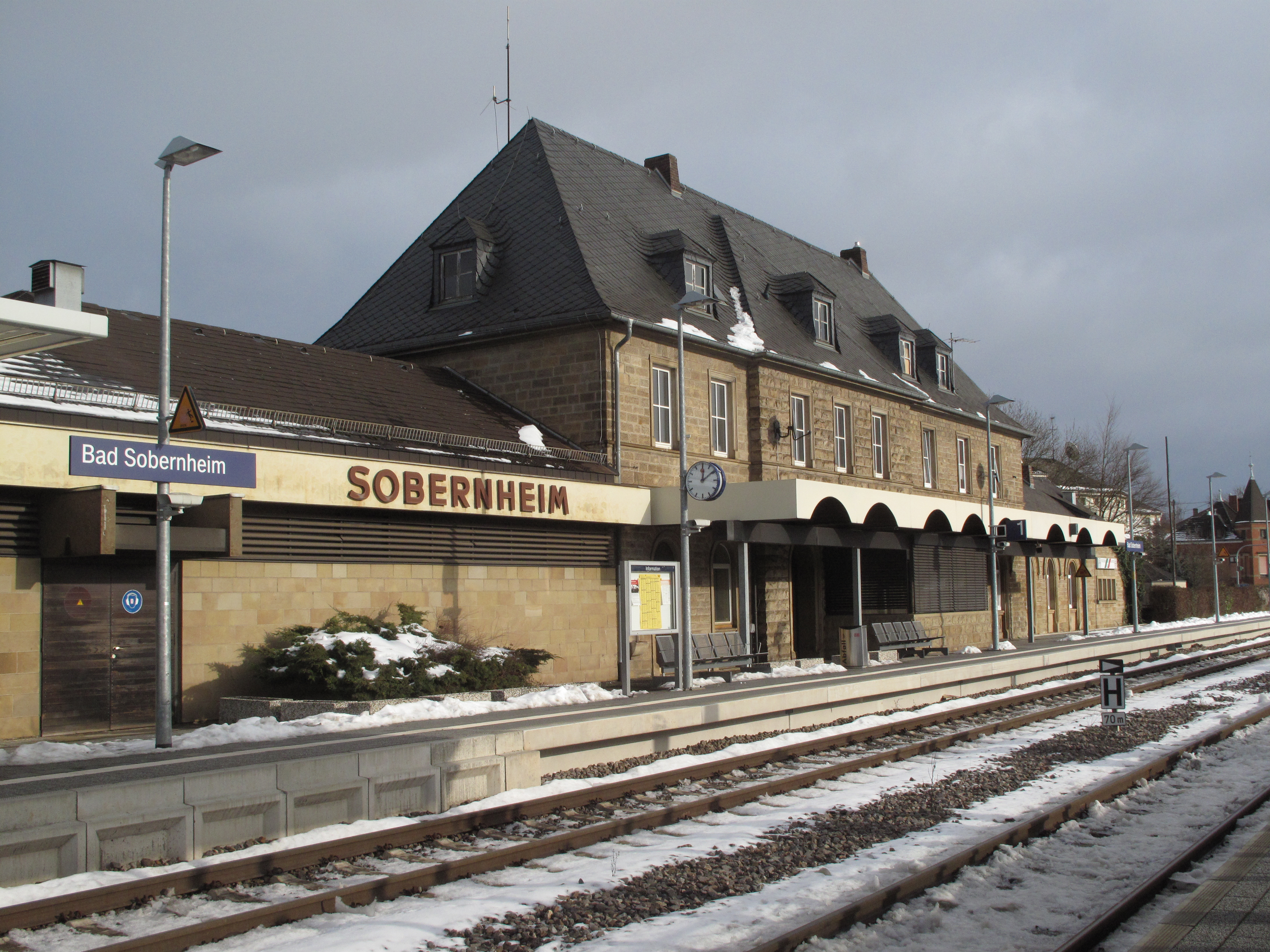

General information
- Location: Bahnstr. 1, Staudernheim, Rhineland-Palatinate; Germany
- Coordinates: 49°46′59″N 7°38′59″E
- Line: Bingen–Saarbrücken (38.44 km)
- Platforms: 3

Construction
- Accessible: Yes

Other information
- Station code: 5875
- DS100 code: SSOB
- Category: 5
- Fare zone: RNN: 420; : 6940 (RNN transitional tariff)
- Website: www.bahnhof.de

Services
Preceding station	Vlexx	Following station
Kirn towards Saarbrücken Hbf	RE 3	Staudernheim towards Frankfurt (Main) Hbf
Monzingen towards Neubrücke (Nahe)	RB 33	Staudernheim towards Wiesbaden Hbf
Location

Bad Sobernheim station is a through station, 38.44 km from Bingen on the Nahe Valley Railway (Bingen–Saarbrücken), in the town of Bad Sobernheim in the district of Bad Kreuznach in the German state of Rhineland-Palatinate. It is classified by Deutsche Bahn as a category 5 station.

== Infrastructure ==
The heritage-listed entrance building was built in the early years of the Nahe Valley Railway during the second half of the 19th century. It consists of a two-story main building, built of sandstone ashlar, with eight portals on the long sides, and flanked by single-storey wings with three portals. The three buildings are topped by slated hip roofs.

From 2006 to 2007, the station was rebuilt and now has two 160 metre-long platforms on three platform tracks, lifts and an underpass. In 2012 the park-and-ride area was expanded. A “bike-and-ride” facility is located at the station to serve riders on the Nahe cycleway (Nahe-Radweg).

== Rail services ==
From Monday to Sunday there is an hourly service by Regional-Express and Regionalbahn services. Every two hours, the Regional-Express service continues directly to/from Frankfurt Airport and Frankfurt Hauptbahnhof (as of 2025).

Line	Route	Frequency
RE 3	Rhein-Nahe-Express; Saarbrücken Hbf – Neunkirchen (Saar) Hbf – Ottweiler (Saar) – Türkismühle – Idar-Oberstein – Bad Sobernheim – Bad Kreuznach - Mainz Hbf	Hourly
RB 33	Nahetalbahn; Idar-Oberstein – Bad Sobernheim – Bad Kreuznach - Mainz Hbf	Hourly

The station is served by buses coordinated by the Rhein-Nahe Nahverkehrsverbund (Rhine-Nahe Transport Association, RNN). In the local transport plan of the Bad Kreuznach district, it is planned to expand operations at the station as a network node.
