= Schweinschied =

- Municipality
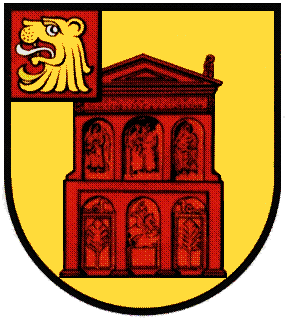
- Coat of arms

- Location of Schweinschied within Bad Kreuznach district
- Interactive map of Schweinschied
- Location within Germany Location within Rhineland-Palatinate
- Coordinates: 49°42′4.21″N 7°34′29.41″E
- Country: Germany
- State: Rhineland-Palatinate
- District: Bad Kreuznach
- Municipal assoc.: Nahe-Glan

Government
  - Mayor (2019–24): Torsten Venter

Area
  - Total: 6.35 km^{2} (2.45 sq mi)
- Elevation: 240 m (790 ft)

Population (2025-12-31)
  - Total: 127
  - Density: 20.0/km^{2} (51.8/sq mi)
- Time zone: UTC+01:00 (CET)
  - Summer (DST): UTC+02:00 (CEST)
- Postal codes: 67744
- Dialling codes: 06753
- Vehicle registration: KH
- Website: www.schweinschied.de

Schweinschied is a municipality in the district of Bad Kreuznach in Rhineland-Palatinate, in western Germany.
