= Staudernheim =

- Municipality
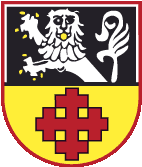
- Coat of arms

- Location of Staudernheim within Bad Kreuznach district
- Interactive map of Staudernheim
- Location within Germany Location within Rhineland-Palatinate
- Coordinates: 49°47′N 7°41′E
- Country: Germany
- State: Rhineland-Palatinate
- District: Bad Kreuznach
- Municipal assoc.: Nahe-Glan

Government
  - Mayor (2019–24): Rolf Kehl (CDU)

Area
  - Total: 11.48 km^{2} (4.43 sq mi)
- Elevation: 140 m (460 ft)

Population (2025-12-31)
  - Total: 1,469
  - Density: 128.0/km^{2} (331.4/sq mi)
- Time zone: UTC+01:00 (CET)
  - Summer (DST): UTC+02:00 (CEST)
- Postal codes: 55568
- Dialling codes: 06751
- Vehicle registration: KH
- Website: www.staudernheim.de

Staudernheim is a municipality in the district of Bad Kreuznach in Rhineland-Palatinate, in western Germany.
