= Lichtenberg =

Lichtenberg may refer to:

== Places ==
- Lichtenberg, Austria
- Lichtenberg, Bas-Rhin, France
- Lichtenberg, Bavaria, Germany
- Lichtenberg, Berlin, Germany
- Lichtenberg, Mittelsachsen, Saxony, Germany
- Lichtenberg (Lausitz), Saxony, Germany
- Lichtenberg (locality), a quarter of Berlin in Lichtenberg district
  - Berlin-Lichtenberg station
- Principality of Lichtenberg, whose territories are now in Germany
- the former German name for the village of Dealul Iederii (or Dealu Ederii) in Bukovina, now part of the village of Clit, Suceava county, Romania

== Astronomy ==
- 7970 Lichtenberg, an asteroid
- Lichtenberg (crater), on the Moon
- Humason (crater), previously Lichtenberg G, on the Moon

== People with the surname ==
- Bernhard Lichtenberg (1875–1943), German priest who died in Gestapo custody
- Byron K. Lichtenberg (born 1948), American astronaut
- Conrad of Lichtenberg (1240–1299), German bishop
- Kornél Lichtenberg (1848 – after 1895), Hungarian audiologist
- Little Fyodor (Dave Lichtenberg, fl. from 1980s), American musician
- Georg Christoph Lichtenberg (1742–1799), German scientist, satirist and anglophile
- Jacqueline Lichtenberg (born 1942), American science fiction author
- Judith Lichtenberg (born 1948), American philosopher
- Leopold Lichtenberg (1861–1935), American violinist
- Lenka Lichtenberg, Canadian singer and songwriter
- Philip Lichtenberg (1669–1678), Dutch military officer and governor of Surinam
- Philipp Lichtenberg, Knight's Cross of the Iron Cross recipient in 1945
- Steen Lichtenberg (born 1930s), Danish engineer
- Tom Lichtenberg (1940–2013), American footballer

== See also ==
- Lichtenberg Castle (disambiguation)
- Lichtenburg (disambiguation)
- Lichtenberger, a surname
- Lichtenberg figure, a branching electric discharge on the surface of insulating materials
