= Principality of Lichtenberg =

Former state in present-day Germany

Coordinates: 49°36′N 7°17′E

Principality of Lichtenberg Fürstentum Lichtenberg
- 1815–1834
- Flag Coat of arms

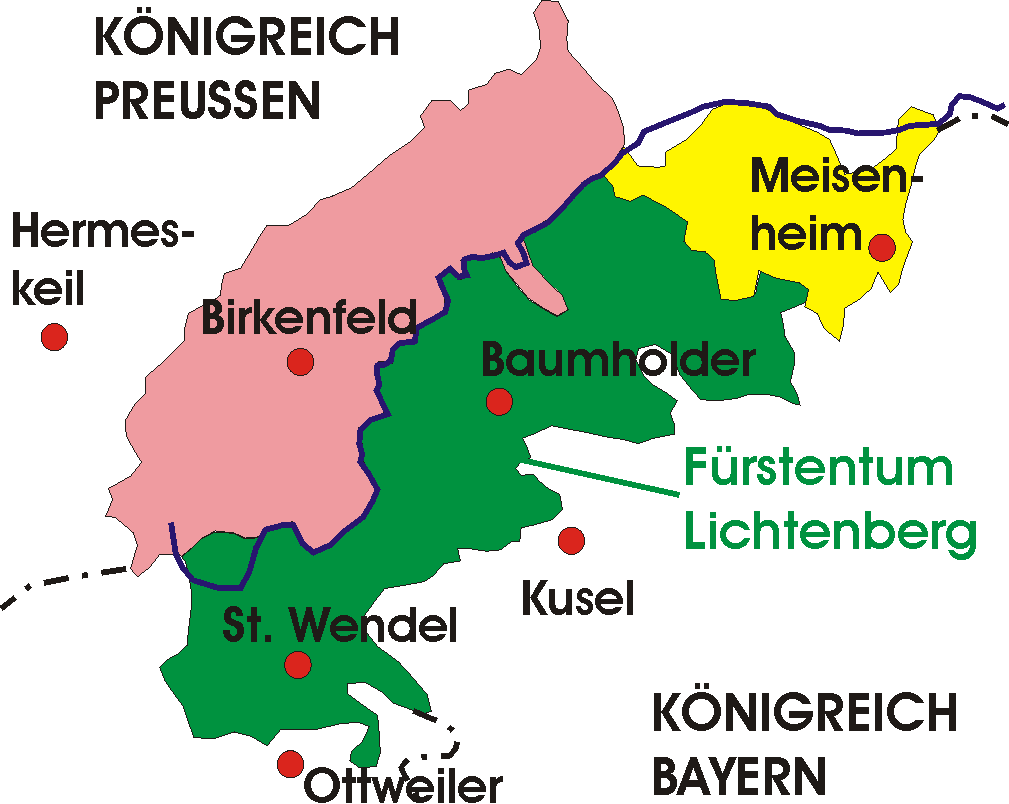
- Principality of Lichtenberg (in green)
- Capital: Sankt Wendel
- Common languages: German
- Government: Monarchy
- Prince
  - 1815-1834: Ernst
- History
  - Congress of Vienna: 1815
  - sold to Prussia: 1834
Preceded by	Succeeded by
First French Empire	Rhine Province (Prussia)

The Principality of Lichtenberg (German: Fürstentum Lichtenberg) on the Nahe River was an exclave of the Duchy of Saxe-Coburg-Saalfeld from 1816 to 1826 and the Duchy of Saxe-Coburg and Gotha from 1826 to 1834, when it was sold to the Kingdom of Prussia. Today its territories lie in two States of Germany: the District of St. Wendel in Saarland and the District of Birkenfeld in Rhineland-Palatinate.

== History ==
Before the French Revolution and the Napoleonic Wars, most of the future Principality of Lichtenberg was held by the Counts Palatine of Zweibrücken. The area of St. Wendel was held by the Prince-Bishops of Trier while the Princes von Salm, as the Rheingrafen (Counts of the Rhine), had Grumbach and the lands west of it. The rest of the area belonged to the Margraves of Baden (as the Counts of Sponheim), the Imperial Counts von den Leyen, and the Princes of Nassau-Usingen.

In the War of the First Coalition Napoleon and his Grande Armée overran the whole Left Bank of the Rhine, which was formally ceded by Holy Roman Emperor Francis II in the 1797 Treaty of Campo Formio. At first an attempt was made to establish a Cisrhenian sister republic but in 1801 (in the Treaty of Lunéville) the land was annexed to the French First Republic, which became the First French Empire in 1804. The future Lichtenberger lands became part of the Département de la Sarre in 1798. The new Département lasted until the 1814 defeat of Napoleon at the Battle of Waterloo.

At the Congress of Vienna (1815), most of the Left Bank went to Bavaria (Rheinkreis), Hesse (Rhenish Hesse) and Prussia (initially as the Grand Duchy of the Lower Rhine and Province of Jülich-Cleves-Berg; these became the Rhine Province in 1822). However, three smaller territories were also established between the Prussian and Bavarian territories: Birkenfeld went to Oldenburg, Meisenheim went to Hesse-Homburg and what would become the Principality of Lichtenberg was given to Duke Ernest III of Saxe-Coburg-Saalfeld. He received as a reward for his services as a general in the battles against Napoleon, a large estate of 8.25 square miles (21.4 km^{2}) and approximately 22,000 residents of St. Wendel and Baumholder, at first under the name of Herrschaft Baumholder. On 11 September 1816 the possession was made official.

By the decree of Ernest III, the Duke of Saxe-Coburg-Saalfeld, on 6 March 1819, the area would be renamed as the Principality of Lichtenberg after Lichtenberg Castle (between Baumholder and Kusel).

St. Wendel was the seat of government. It was also the residence of Louise of Saxe-Gotha-Altenburg (Duchess of Saxe-Coburg-Saalfeld), who lived there from 1824 until her death in 1831. Divorced in 1826, she was the mother of Prince Ernest, the future Duke of Saxe-Coburg and Gotha, and Prince Albert, the future husband of Queen Victoria, who both spent some of their childhood in St. Wendel.

In 1817, the territories were divided into three cantons and 15 Burgermeistereien (mayoralties).

In 1826, the Principality of Lichtenberg went from one duchy to another, during the extensive rearrangement of the Ernestine duchies and Ernest III, the Duke of Saxe-Coburg-Saalfield, became Ernest I, the Duke of Saxe-Coburg and Gotha.

Because of political unrest in St. Wendel on 31 May 1834 and the great distance from the rest of the Duchy, the Duke, Ernest I, sold the Principality to Prussia on 15 August 1834 for the annuity of 80,000 talers. Most of the proceeds were used for the expansion of the ducal possessions in Grein (Upper Austria). The Kingdom of Prussia annexed the lands as Kreis Sankt Wendel (District; lit. 'Circle'), which became part of the Trier region (Regierungsbezirk) of the Rhine Province.

== Territories ==
- Area: 537 km^{2} (207.34 mi^{2})
- Population: c. 25,000
- Communities: There were about a hundred municipalities in the Principality.

Today the territories are in the following States of Germany:

In the Saarland

- The City of St. Wendel without, until 1947, the Palatinate localities of Bubach, Hoof, Marth, Niederkirchen, Osterbrücken and Saal;
- The Municipality of Freisen without the localities of Asweiler and Eitzweiler;
- The Municipality of Marpingen without the locality of Berschweiler;
- The Municipality of Namborn without the locality of Hirstein;
- The Municipality of Oberthal without the locality of Steinberg-Deckenhardt;
- From the City of Ottweiler, the ward of Fürth with Wetschhausen, Mainzweiler and Steinbach.

In Rhineland-Palatinate:

- The whole Verbandsgemeinde (municipal association of) Baumholder;
- all the now-defunct municipalities in the area of the military training base of Baumholder;
- From the city of Idar-Oberstein, the wards of Hammerstein, Kirchen-, Mittel- and Nahbollenbach as well as Weierbach;
- From the Verbandsgemeinde Herrstein, the Municipalities of Dickesbach, Mittelreidenbach, Oberreidenbach, Schmidthachenbach, Sien (with Sienerhöfe), Sienhachenbach;
- From the Verbandsgemeinde Kusel, the local municipalities of Pfeffelbach, Reichweiler, Ruthweiler and Thallichtenberg (with Burglichtenberg);
- From the Verbandsgemeinde Lauterecken, the Municipalities of Buborn, Deimberg, Grumbach, Hausweiler, Herren-Sulzbach, Homberg, Kappeln, Kirrweiler, Langweiler, Merzweiler, Niederalben, Unterjeckenbach and Wiesweiler
- From the local municipality of Offenbach-Hundheim, the locality of Offenbach and
- From the local municipality of Glanbrücken, the locality of Niedereisenbach.

== Government ==
- Christoph Arzberger (1772–1822), astronomer, educator, professor of mathematics at the Gymnasium Casimirianum in Coburg, Privy Councilor and President of the Administration of the Principality of Lichtenberg 1821-1822 and Kammerpräsident [President of the Cabinet] of Saxe-Coburg-Saalfeld 1821–1822

== Bibliography ==
- (in German) Gerhard Köbler, Historisches Lexikon der Deutschen Länder: die deutschen Territorien vom Mittelalter bis zur Gegenwart [Historical Dictionary of the German States: The German Territories from the Middle Ages to the Present] (Munich: Verlag C.H. Beck, 2007), ISBN 978-3-406-54986-1, p. 375.
- (in German) Friedrich August Lottner, Sammlung der für das Fürstenthum Lichtenberg vom Jahre 1816 bis 1834 ergangenen herzoglich Sachsen-Coburg-Gothaischen Verordnungen [Collection of the Orders Issued to the Principality of Lichtenberg between the years 1816 and 1834 by the Ordinances of the Duchy of Saxe-Coburg-Gotha] (Berlin: Sandersche Buchhandlung [Sander Bookshop], 1836) (Google Books)
