= Lichtenberger =

Lichtenberger is a German surname. Notable people with the surname include:

- André Lichtenberger (1870–1940), French novelist and sociologist
- Andrew Lichtenberger (born 1987), American professional poker player
- Armando Lichtenberger Jr., American musician and producer
- Arthur C. Lichtenberger (1900–1968), American Anglican bishop
- Elisabeth Lichtenberger (1925–2017), Austrian geographer
- Eva Lichtenberger (born 1954), Austrian politician
- Frédéric Auguste Lichtenberger (1832–1899), French theologian
- Harold Lichtenberger (1920–1993), American physicist
- Henri Lichtenberger (1864–1941), French academic
- Hermann Lichtenberger (general) (1892–1959), Luftwaffe general
- Hermann Lichtenberger (theologian) (born 1943), German professor at University of Tübingen
- Johannes Lichtenberger (died 1503), German astrologer
- Louis Lichtenberger (1835–1892), American businessman

== See also ==
- Ulrich Hesse-Lichtenberger
- Lichtenberg (disambiguation)
