= Cornel (given name) =

Cornel is a given name and occasionally a nickname (a hypocorism or short form of Corneliu). It may refer to:

== Given name ==
- Cornel Buta (born 1977), Romanian footballer
- Cornel Cernea (born 1976), Romanian football goalkeeper
- Cornel Chin-Sue (born 1976), Jamaican footballer
- Cornel Cornea (born 1981), Romanian footballer
- Cornel Damian (born 1960), Romanian Roman Catholic auxiliary bishop
- Cornel Dinu (born 1948), Romanian retired football defender
- Cornel Dobre (born 1975), Romanian footballer
- Cornel Drăgușin (1926–2021), Romanian football manager
- Cornel Durău (born 1957), Romanian handball player
- Cornel Feruță (born 1975), Romanian diplomat
- Cornel Frăsineanu (born 1976), Romanian footballer
- Cornel Fredericks (born 1990), South African 400 m hurdler
- Cornel Gheorghe (born 1971), Romanian coach and retired figure skater
- Cornel Lengyel (1914–2003), American poet, historian, playwright and translator
- Cornel Lichtenberg (1848–?), Hungarian physician
- Cornel Lucas (1920–2012), British photographer
- Cornel Medrea (1888–1964), Romanian sculptor
- Cornel Oțelea (1940–2025), Romanian handball player
- Cornel Patrichi (1944–2016), Romanian ballet dancer, choreographer and actor
- Cornel Pavlovici (1943–2013), Romanian footballer
- Cornel Penu (born 1946), Romanian retired handball player
- Cornel Piper (1937–2018), retired Canadian Football League player
- Cornel Popa, various people
- Cornel Predescu (born 1987), Romanian footballer
- Cornel Țălnar (born 1957), Romanian coach and retired footballer
- Cornel Vena (1932–2017), Romanian pentathlete
- Cornel West (born 1953), American political scholar

== Nickname ==
- Cornel Marin (born 1953), Romanian fencer and two-time Olympic bronze medalist
- Corneliu Oros (born 1950), Romanian retired volleyball player
