= Becherbach =

Becherbach refers to two nearby villages in the district of Bad Kreuznach, Rhineland-Palatinate, Germany:

- Becherbach (Bad Kreuznach), part of the Verbandsgemeinde of Meisenheim
- Becherbach bei Kirn, part of the Verbandsgemeinde of Kirner Land
