= Grossbach =

Grossbach or Großbach may refer to:

- Großbach (Ruwer), a river of Rhineland-Palatinate, Germany, tributary of the Ruwer
- Großbach (Nahe), a river of Rhineland-Palatinate, Germany, tributary of the Nahe
