= Bärenbach, Bad Kreuznach =

Bärenbach
- Municipality
- Coat of arms

- Location of Bärenbach within Bad Kreuznach district
- Interactive map of Bärenbach
- Location within Germany Location within Rhineland-Palatinate
- Coordinates: 49°44′54″N 7°26′28″E
- Country: Germany
- State: Rhineland-Palatinate
- District: Bad Kreuznach
- Municipal assoc.: Kirner Land

Government
  - Mayor (2019–24): Jürgen Schmidt

Area
  - Total: 5.6 km^{2} (2.2 sq mi)
- Elevation: 253 m (830 ft)

Population (2025-12-31)
  - Total: 487
  - Density: 87/km^{2} (230/sq mi)
- Time zone: UTC+01:00 (CET)
  - Summer (DST): UTC+02:00 (CEST)
- Postal codes: 55758
- Dialling codes: 06784
- Vehicle registration: KH

Bärenbach (German pronunciation: [ˈbɛːʁənbax]) is an Ortsgemeinde – a municipality belonging to a Verbandsgemeinde, a kind of collective municipality – in the Bad Kreuznach district in Rhineland-Palatinate, Germany. It belongs to the Verbandsgemeinde Kirner Land, whose seat is in the town of Kirn.

== Geography ==
=== Location ===
Bärenbach lies on the Großbach, a short way upstream from where it empties into the river Nahe, and 47.1% of the municipal area is wooded.

=== Neighbouring municipalities ===
Clockwise from the north, Bärenbach's neighbours are the town of Kirn, the municipality of Heimweiler (both in the Bad Kreuznach district), the town of Idar-Oberstein, the municipality of Fischbach and the municipality of Bergen (all three in the neighbouring Birkenfeld district).

== History ==
Bärenbach's founding might have come about in that time when the clearing of the so-called jüngerer Siedlungsraum ("newer settling grounds"), meaning mainly the near edge of the Soon and the uplands, began in the early 7th century; it was completed by the 12th century. The great importance of this mediaeval clearing process lies in its having been the first time that new land for farming was conquered not by the sword, but rather with the axe. Most new settlements in the woodlands may at first have been only single farms, or at best, groups of homesteads forming the core of a settlement. As late as 1599, Bärenbach still boasted only 12 hearths (for which read "households" or "families"). Data given by H. Kaufmann about the Bad Kreuznach district's placenames show that Bärenbach was mentioned in documents as early as 1108 ("Gerardus comes de Berenbach", UB. Mainz I n. 436). The village's history is tightly bound with the neighbouring Castle Naumburg. In 1146, Raugrave Emicho named "Graf von Nuenburc" ("Count of Naumburg"), thus giving the castle its first documentary mention. Castle Naumburg (from Neue Burg, meaning "New Castle") likely got its name from being a newer founding than the nearby Kyrburg (another castle) or even the Hachenfels (a now vanished castle). Castle Naumburg stood on a hill near where the Bärenbach (the brook from which the municipality draws its name) empties into the Nahe. It was among the Raugraves' holdings; this comital house also held further castles and administrative rights on the Alsenz, the Appelbach, the Großbach and the Hunsrück. After changes in ownership arrangements, the Raugraves transferred the castle in the 14th century to the Counts of Sponheim-Kreuznach, who made it into the administrative seat of a small Amt comprising the courts of Bärenbach, Becherbach and Martin-Weierbach, along with parts of Löllbach and Oberreidenbach. According to a description of the Amt compiled in 1599, the High Court of Becherbach was the hub of the Amt of Naumburg. At the time when the County of Sponheim was partitioned in 1706, the Amt of Naumburg was assigned to the Badish part, then forming the Oberamt of Naumburg, and in 1776, the Amt of Herrstein from the "Hinder" County of Sponheim was annexed to it. Further, the Imperial-knightly lordship of Martinstein, which belonged to the Margrave of Baden, was administratively tied to the Amt of Naumburg. According to a description of the Amt of Naumburg from 1785, Bärenbach had 32 houses and as many families. One third of Bärenbach's municipal area was lordly domain. The biggest house belonged to the family Nagel, who had long administered the headsman's and knacker's office. By 1755, Louis George, Margrave of Baden-Baden had pledged his Naumburg landhold against 2,550 Rhenish guilders to 16 families in Bärenbach. During the time of French rule, the pledge was redeemed in favour of the French state. After the family Puricelli had later acquired the pledge at auction, it was only in 1855 that 22 Bärenbach families had lands transferred to them against a payment of 7,200 Rhenish guilders. During the French occupation of the lands on the Rhine's left bank, Bärenbach belonged to the Mairie ("Mayoralty") of Schmidthachenbach, the Canton of Grumbach and the Department of Sarre. It was also under French rule that the building complexes at the Naumburg were torn down. Under the terms laid down by the Congress of Vienna after the Napoleonic Wars had ended, a new political order was established, which at first saw Bärenbach placed under Prussian administration in 1815. Soon thereafter, however, sometime in 1816 or 1817, the village found itself ruled by Hesse-Homburg, within which it became part of the Oberschultheißerei, and later Bürgermeisterei ("Mayoralty"), of Becherbach. Only in 1821 did the municipality build itself its own church, to which Schmidthachenbach was later, in 1903, added as a vicariate. Until this church was built, Bärenbach had always belonged to the parish of Becherbach. Until 1866, the Bürgermeisterei of Becherbach belonged to the Oberamt of Meisenheim, which was subject to the Landgraves of Hesse-Homburg. In the time that followed, Becherbach remained a local administrative seat when in 1869 the new Prussian Meisenheim district was newly formed out of the former Oberamt. In 1932, the Meisenheim district was dissolved and its lands were merged into the Bad Kreuznach district. Eight years later, by which time Adolf Hitler and the Nazis had not only founded the Third Reich but also started the Second World War, the Amt of Becherbach was dissolved in the course of administrative reform and then merged into the Amt of Kirn-Land. From this time, Kirn became the hub for all administrative functions for the citizens of Bärenbach. Since the latest administrative reform, in 1969 and 1970, Bärenbach has been part of the Verbandsgemeinde of Kirn-Land.

=== Municipality's name ===
About the derivation of the name "Bärenbach" there is no consensus. There are two other villages in Rhineland-Palatinate alone with this same name (this one, for one). If interpreted as a Modern High German word, its meaning would be "Bear's Brook", but the modern spelling may not be indicative of the name's etymology. Decisive for the interpretation is the first syllable, which – as also with the village of Bärweiler – was originally Ber— (Berenbach/Berwilre). In Middle High German usage, this syllable had several meanings and was applied to not only the bear (Bär in Modern High German) but also the breeding boar (in which case it was cognate with the still current English word boar) and even barley (in which case it was cognate with the Old English word bere, which helped give rise to the modern word barley), now called Gerste in German. At times, placename researchers lean towards the interpretation of the name having sprung from the brown bear, which once roamed this area. It seems much likelier, though, that the name is drawn from a personal or family name. Many placenames after all go back to a village's owner, founder or leader, with the village that grows up drawing its name from a homestead that once stood there. If so, Bärenbach might have drawn its name from a man named Bero, a short form of the name Berengar.

== Religion ==
As at 31 July 2013, there are 504 full-time residents in Bärenbach, and of those, 311 are Evangelical (61.706%), 116 are Catholic (23.016%), 14 (2.778%) belong to other religious groups and 63 (12.5%) either have no religion or will not reveal their religious affiliation.

== Politics ==
=== Municipal council ===
The council is made up of 12 council members, who were elected by majority vote at the municipal election held on 7 June 2009, and the honorary mayor as chairman.

=== Mayor ===
Bärenbach's mayor is Jürgen Schmidt, and his deputies are Alfred Litzenburger and Herbert Bangert.

=== Coat of arms ===
The municipality's arms might be described thus: Per fess abased vert a bend sinister wavy couped at the line of partition and a berry couped in pale, both argent, and chequy of eighteen azure and Or.

These are canting arms, referring as they do to the municipality's name. The two charges in the upper field are the canting elements referring to the two parts of the name, a berry (Beere in German) for the name prefix and the wavy bend sinister (slanted stripe) standing for a brook (Bach in German). Some old descriptions record the village's name as Beerenbach, which literally does mean "Berrybrook". This would have been pronounced slightly differently from the current name, with the first vowel a bit higher, more an [eː] than the current [ɛː]. The tincture vert (green) was chosen for two local dales. The lower field is a reference to the village's former allegiance to the "Further" County of Sponheim. Municipal council gave the graphic artist Brust from Kirn-Sulzbach the task of designing a municipal coat of arms on 8 October 1963. At a council meeting on 6 May 1964, council adopted the design that had been put forth. After consent by the state archive, the Ministry of the Interior in Mainz granted approval for Bärenbach to bear its own arms on 12 May 1965.

== Culture and sightseeing ==
=== Buildings ===
The following are listed buildings or sites in Rhineland-Palatinate's Directory of Cultural Monuments:

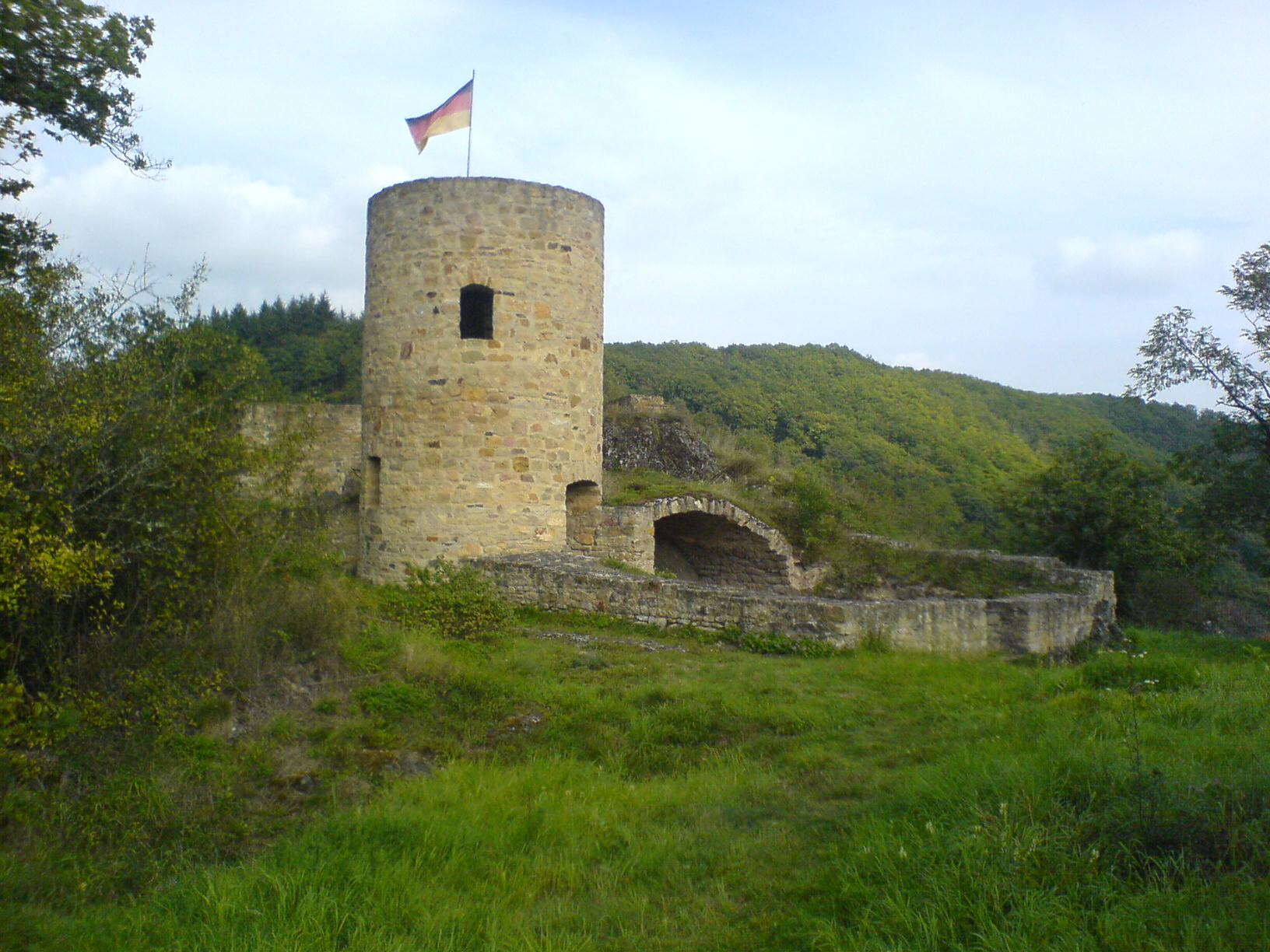
Naumburg castle ruin

- Evangelical church, Hauptstraße 31 – aisleless church, marked 1821, widened 1967/1968
- Hauptstraße 46 – former Spielmannsmühle (mill), estate complex; combination house and mill, marked 1763, barn with half-hip roof, marked 1834 and 1748
- Unterdorfstraße 2 – timber-frame house, 17th century
- Castle Naumburg ruin – formerly stately hill castle, round tower walled back up in the 1980s

=== Clubs ===
The following clubs are active in Bärenbach:

- Evangelische Frauenhilfe Bärenbach — "Bärenbach Evangelical Women's Aid"
- Förderverein Fußballclub 1921 Bärenbach e.V. — football club promotional association
- Freiwillige Feuerwehr Bärenbach — volunteer fire brigade
- Fußballclub 1921 Bärenbach e.V. — football club
- Heimat- und Verschönerungsverein Bärenbach e.V. — "Bärenbach Local History and Beautification Club"
- Jugendclub Bärenbach e.V. — youth club
- Männergesangverein "Liederkranz" 1872 Bärenbach e.V. — men's singing club
- Verein Freunde und Förderer der Feuerwehr in der Gemeinde Bärenbach e.V. — "Club of Friends and Promoters of the Fire Brigade in the Municipality of Bärenbach"
- Vereinigung Landfrauen Bärenbach — "Bärenbach Coalition of Countrywomen"

== Economy and infrastructure ==
=== Transport ===
Running to the village's west is Bundesstraße 41. Bärenbach has no railway station of its own, but serving nearby Kirn-Sulzbach is a station on the Nahe Valley Railway (Bingen–Saarbrücken).
