= Becherbach bei Kirn =

- Municipality
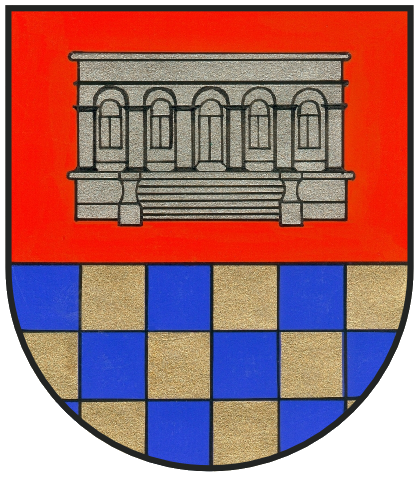
- Coat of arms

- Location of Becherbach bei Kirn within Bad Kreuznach district
- Interactive map of Becherbach bei Kirn
- Location within Germany Location within Rhineland-Palatinate
- Coordinates: 49°44′28″N 7°30′01″E
- Country: Germany
- State: Rhineland-Palatinate
- District: Bad Kreuznach
- Municipal assoc.: Kirner Land

Government
  - Mayor (2019–24): Karl-Otto Selzer

Area
  - Total: 8.41 km^{2} (3.25 sq mi)
- Elevation: 260 m (850 ft)

Population (2025-12-31)
  - Total: 405
  - Density: 48.2/km^{2} (125/sq mi)
- Time zone: UTC+01:00 (CET)
  - Summer (DST): UTC+02:00 (CEST)
- Postal codes: 55608
- Dialling codes: 06757
- Vehicle registration: KH

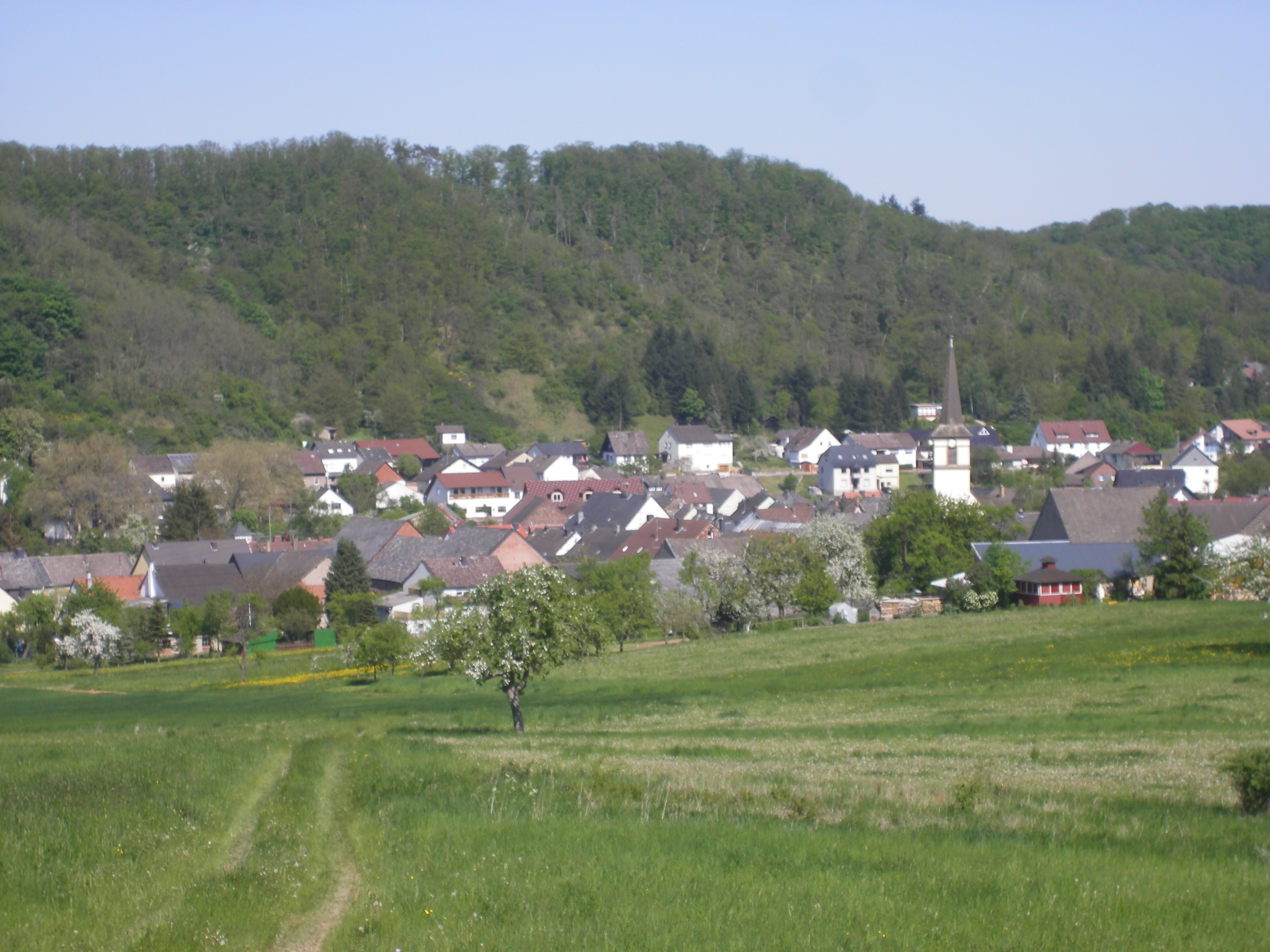
View of Becherbach bei Kirn

Becherbach bei Kirn is an Ortsgemeinde – a municipality belonging to a Verbandsgemeinde, a kind of collective municipality – in the Bad Kreuznach district in Rhineland-Palatinate, Germany. It belongs to the Verbandsgemeinde Kirner Land, whose seat is in the town of Kirn. Becherbach bei Kirn should not be confused with Becherbach. Becherbach bei Kirn has borne the tag “bei Kirn” since 1 July 1969, at which time both municipalities found themselves in the same district as a result of administrative reform.

== Geography ==
=== Location ===
Becherbach bei Kirn is situated on the Großbach in the North Palatine Uplands between the Nahe and the Glan.

=== Neighbouring municipalities ===
Clockwise from the north, Becherbach bei Kirn's neighbours are the municipality of Heimweiler, the municipality of Limbach, the municipality of Otzweiler (all in the Bad Kreuznach district) and the municipality of Schmidthachenbach (in the Birkenfeld district).

== History ==
=== Antiquity ===
Unearthed within Becherbach's limits have been archaeological finds bearing witness to a settlement here during Roman times.

=== Middle Ages ===
Lying as it did on a trade road that linked the Kirn area with the Glan valley, Becherbach was in the Middle Ages the administrative and judicial seat for a whole series of villages in the surrounding area. Belonging to the court of Becherbach were the villages of Becherbach, Krebsweiler, Heimberg, Limbach, Otzweiler, Schmidthachenbach and Thal, a hamlet of four households in 1599 whose inhabitants enjoyed certain special privileges. This place has since vanished, and it is now uncertain as to where it lay. Named as possible sites for it have been a spot near Castle Naumburg and a location between Otzweiler and Becherbach. The Unteramtsbezirk of Becherbach was part of the Amt of Naumburg, which was made up of the courts of Bärenbach, Martin-Weierbach, Oberhachenbach, Oberreidenbach, Löllbach and, of course, Becherbach. This Amt of Naumburg was ceded by the Raugraves, a sideline of the Waldgraves, to the Counts of Sponheim-Kreuznach, first half of it in 1349, and then the whole towards the end of the 14th century. The Amt administrative seat was Castle Naumburg near Bärenbach, which had its first documentary mention, along with its owner, Raugrave Emich, in 1146.

=== Modern times ===
At the time when the County of Sponheim was partitioned in 1706, the Amt of Naumburg was assigned to the Badish part, then forming the Oberamt of Naumburg, and in 1776, the Amt seat was moved to Herrstein. Economically, the inhabitants of the Amt of Naumburg turned towards Kirn, where, as witnessed by a record from 1579, they had to pay an “oat toll” (Zollhafer) just to get into the market. This was a kind of “sales tax” levied by the Ganerben (holders of a joint-rule arrangement) of Steinkallenfels. The Becherbach court district was likewise a parish, whose mother church stood in Becherbach. Only in 1820 did Schmidthachenbach pass to the parish of Sien. The ecclesiastical structure was defined from 1345 to 1606 by the Lords of Oberstein, and later by the Lords of Löwenstein and the Lords of Schmidtburg. In 1785, Becherbach had 45 houses with 46 families. A few houses had upper floors.

==== Recent times ====
After the conquest by French Revolutionary troops, the villages of the former Amt of Naumburg passed to French hegemony beginning in 1794. Becherbach temporarily lost its function as an Amt seat and as of 1801 or 1802 belonged to the Mairie (“Mayoralty”) of Schmidthachenbach. Also belonging to this were Otzweiler, Limbach, Heimberg, Krebsweiler and Bärenbach. After French rule ended, the area was subject as of 1814 at first to a joint Bavarian-Austrian transitional administration, but by the following year it had become Prussian before ending up in 1816 or 1817 in the Landgraviate of Hesse-Homburg. Becherbach now once again became a local seat of an Amt mayoralty as a so-called Oberschultheißerei in the Hesse-Homburg Oberamt of Meisenheim. After the House of Hesse-Homburg died out, the landgraviate passed in 1866 by inheritance first to the Grand Duchy of Hesse-Darmstadt, but then only half a year later ultimately to Prussia. With the formation of the Prussian district of Meisenheim in 1869, the Bürgermeisterei (“Mayoralty”) of Becherbach was enlarged with the addition of Hoppstädten and Hundsbach, which remained therein until 1940. In 1932, the Meisenheim district was dissolved and merged into the Bad Kreuznach district. The dissolution of the Amt of Becherbach and its assignment to the Amt of Kirn-Land came about in 1940. Since 1969 or 1970, the village, now an Ortsgemeinde, has been part of the Verbandsgemeinde of Kirn-Land.

=== Jewish history ===
In the 19th century, Becherbach was home to a small Jewish community. Its origins went back to the 18th century. Between 1782 and 1785, the municipal accounts name the families of David, Isaak and Salomon. Each of the Schutzjuden had to pay each year ten Rhenish guilders in Schutzgeld (literally “protection money”) to the lordly landholders. Living in the Mairie of Schmidthachenbach – to which Becherbach belonged – in 1808 were all together 57 Jews: in Becherbach 13 (three married couples, five boys, two girls), in Schmidthachenbach 12 (two married couples, three boys, four girls, one widow), in Weierbach 30 (five married couples, ten boys, nine girls, one widow) and in Otzweiler two (one married couple). In the course of the 19th century, the number of Jewish inhabitants developed as follows: 18 in 1867; 16 in 1887 (out of a total population of 489); 20 in 1895 (out of a total population of 490). In the Great Fire of Becherbach on 9 September 1854, 29 houses and 54 separate commercial buildings were destroyed, and others were damaged. The “synagogue”, too (see below), was burnt down. In the earlier half of the 19th century – indeed until about 1870 – the following ten Jewish families are known from civil registry documents and the municipal books to have lived in Becherbach:

1. Isaak Moritz (1749-1827, tradesman) and wife Sophie née David with three children;
2. Peter Moritz (1788-1856) and wife Edeline Binnes (1786-?, after husband's death emigrated to United States) with six children;
3. Simon Moritz (1783-1862) with wife Nannette née Gottschalk from Hennweiler (1797-1859) with eight children;
4. Michael Moritz (1795-1856) and wife Karoline née Wendel from Rachtig (1794-1859) with four children;
5. Joseph Wolf from Löllbach (1803-1837) with wife Johannetta née David (1793-?) with three children;
6. Emanuel Marx (1817-?) and first wife Henriette née Salomon from Waldmohr (1819-1851) and second wife Christina née Salomon (1829-?) with all together four children;
7. Ferdinand Moritz (1822-?) and wife Judith née Haas (1818-?) with five children (all emigrated to United States in 1863);
8. David Wolf (1832-?, spice dealer) and wife Mina née Loeb (1830-?) with six children (all moved to Kirn);
9. David Moritz (1821-1881) and wife Regina née Löser from Laufersweiler (1828-1897) with four children;
10. Ferdinand Moritz II (1830-?) and wife Wilhelmine née Löser from Laufersweiler (1835-?) with eight children.

In the way of institutions, the Jews had a “prayer parlour” (see below) and a graveyard. Since there was such a small Jewish population in Becherbach, it was hardly possible regularly to gather a minyan for services, and so the Jewish families in Becherbach joined the community in Hundsbach (see the relevant sections of that article for the community's history and information about its synagogue), and then no later than the 1920s, they joined the community in Kirn. In the First World War, one member of the Jewish community fell, Max Alfred Moritz (b. 16 May 1890 in Becherbach [or in Meisenheim, having lived until 1914 in Kirn] as salesman Isidor Moritz's and his wife Regina's [née Wendel] son, d. 20 June 1916). His name is to be found on the plaque of honour for the fallen of both world wars at the Becherbach graveyard. About 1924, when there were only five Jews still living in the village, they belonged – as mentioned above – to the community in Kirn. They were four members of the family Moritz and an older man named Eisick (Isaak). After Kristallnacht (9–10 November 1938), the village's last Jewish inhabitants left. On Kristallnacht itself, the family Moritz's shophouse was attacked and damaged. Mr. Moritz was taken to the Kirn prison, and thereafter was imprisoned at Dachau for three months. In 1939, the family Moritz fled by way of Luxembourg to France, where they survived the time of the Holocaust. Two others born in Becherbach, Ernst Moritz and Alfred Moritz, have since died (in August 2010 and January 2011 respectively). According to the Gedenkbuch – Opfer der Verfolgung der Juden unter der nationalsozialistischen Gewaltherrschaft in Deutschland 1933-1945 ("Memorial Book – Victims of the Persecution of the Jews under National Socialist Tyranny") and Yad Vashem, of all Jews who either were born in Becherbach or lived there for a long time, three were killed during Nazi persecution (birthdates in brackets):

1. Claire Löb née Moritz (1889);
2. Alfred Moritz (1886);
3. Frieda Moritz (1890).

=== Municipality’s name ===
The name Becherbach may derive from the Middle High German bechaere and may be linked with the production of pitch (Pech in German) or charcoal.

== Religion ==
After the Reformation was introduced in 1557, Becherbach was until 1706 mainly Protestant, and thereafter a simultaneum held sway until 1892. The church has a Romanesque tower from the 12th century onto which in the years 1783-1788 a new nave was built, replacing one that had fallen into disrepair. In 1837, the three-floor tower was given two more floors and also its current pointed top. Beginning in 1757, there was a Catholic elementary school, even though only five Catholic families lived in the village then. Among the Protestants, those of the Reformed faith predominated, and each denomination had its own schoolteacher. As at 31 July 2013, there are 388 full-time residents in Becherbach bei Kirn, and of those, 290 are Evangelical (74.742%), 51 are Catholic (13.144%), one is Lutheran (0.258%), 2 (0.515%) belong to other religious groups and 44 (11.34%) either have no religion or will not reveal their religious affiliation.

=== Synagogue ===
The Jewish families in Becherbach bei Kirn established not so much a synagogue as a Betstube (“praying parlour”). In a great fire that struck the village on 9 September 1854, leaving 29 of the village's families homeless, the “praying parlour” – it was often called the “synagogue” – was burnt down, too. It is unknown in which house this small worship centre was. After the fire, it was never reestablished, and the village's Jewish inhabitants thereafter went to services in Hundsbach.

== Politics ==
=== Municipal council ===
The council is made up of 8 council members, who were elected by majority vote at the municipal election held on 7 June 2009, and the honorary mayor as chairman.

=== Mayor ===
Becherbach bei Kirn's mayor is Karl-Otto Selzer.

=== Coat of arms ===
The German blazon reads: Über blau-gold geschachtem Schildfuß in Rot eine silberne Hauswand mit 6 durch Bogen verbundenen Säulen über einem Sockel, der in der Breite von 3 Bogen von einer Treppe durchbrochen ist. Im mittleren Bogen befindet sich eine Tür, in den übrigen befinden sich Fenster.

The municipality's arms might in English heraldic language be described thus: Per fess abased gules a house wall with six columns conjoined by arches on a base interrupted for the breadth of the three middle arches by a stairway, in the middle arch a door, in each of the others a window, the whole argent, and chequy of 18 azure and Or.

The charge in the upper field is a depiction of the entrance portal of a now vanished building, the Amtsgebäude (“Amt building”) in Becherbach, which was destroyed in 1944 in an air raid. The building, as seat of the Amt administration for the municipalities of Becherbach bei Kirn, Bärenbach, Heimberg, Hoppstädten, Hundsbach, Krebsweiler, Limbach and Otzweiler, was long the hub of this historically important municipality. From the time when the Amt was dissolved in 1940 until the building's destruction, it served Becherbach alone as the municipal hall. The “chequy” pattern in the lower field is a reference to the village's former allegiance to the “Further” County of Sponheim. On 11 June 1965, municipal council commissioned the graphic artist Brust, from Kirn-Sulzbach, to come up with a design for a municipal coat of arms. At its meeting on 18 September 1965, council adopted Brust's resulting design. After consent by the state archive, the Ministry of the Interior in Mainz granted approval for Becherbach to bear its own arms on 29 December 1965. The arms also appear on the municipal banner.

== Culture and sightseeing ==
=== Buildings ===
The following are listed buildings or sites in Rhineland-Palatinate’s Directory of Cultural Monuments:

- Evangelical parish church, Kirchstraße – Early Classicist aisleless church, 1783–1786, State Building Inspector Lindemann, west tower essentially Romanesque, made taller in 1837
- Catholic church, Neue Straße – Gothic Revival aisleless church, brickwork walls, 1893
- Hauptstraße 23 – timber-frame house, essentially possibly from the 18th century
- Im Winkel 1 – former Evangelical rectory; Baroque timber-frame building, marked 1749
- Im Winkel 2 – former school; partly timber-frame, marked 1755, essentially possibly from the 16th century
- Oberdorfstraße 1 – former smithy; timber-frame knee wall, latter half of the 19th century
- Oberdorfstraße 5 – former school; timber-frame building like house with single roof ridge, 1820
- Oberdorfstraße 14 – house, Renaissance building, Flemish gable, marked 1597
- Across from Sachsenhausen 13 – water cistern; built of red brick with sandstone finial, iron door marked “1899/C. Hiller”
- Schulstraße – former school; building with hip roof, partly slated timber framing, Heimatstil, 1911
- Monument, on Landesstraße 182 – boulder, possibly from the 1920s/1930s
- Jewish graveyard, southwest of the village at the edge of the forest (monumental zone) – area with 21 gravestones from 1881 to 1938 (see also below)

=== Jewish graveyard ===
When the Jewish graveyard in Becherbach bei Kirn was laid out is unknown. The older part with its 13 preserved gravestones would likely date to the latter half of the 18th century (gravestone no. 3 dated to 1762). A new part of the graveyard was laid out about 1880. The first burial took place here on 7 June 1881 (David Moritz, b. 1821, husband of Regina Moritz née Loeser, b. 1828, d. 1897), while the last one took place in October 1938 (Regina Moritz née Wendel, b. 1853 in Nahbollenbach, d. 16 October 1938; widow of Isidor Moritz, b. 1860, d. 1908). The graveyard was last registered to the following owners: Gustav Moritz, Isidor Moritz's widow (Regina Moritz née Wendel), Bernhard Moritz and once again Gustav Moritz. All together there are 21 graves marked with a gravestone. The graveyard's area is 617 m^{2}. In 1999, the graveyard was placed under monumental protection. The graveyard lies not far from the road that leads from Becherbach to Schmidthachenbach. Near the way out of the village, right by the Christian graveyard at the left, a farm lane coming from Becherbach leads in a righthand curve to a nearby grove in which the Jewish graveyard is found.

=== Clubs ===
The following clubs are active in Becherbach bei Kirn:

- Becherbacher Brückenchor – choir
- Becherbacher Fassenachts-Bagaasch – Shrovetide Carnival group
- Chor der Evangelischen Kirchengemeinde – Evangelical church choir
- Förderverein Kindergarten Becherbach e.V. – kindergarten promotional association
- Jugendgruppe Becherbach e.V. – youth group
- Kultur- und Verschönerungsverein Becherbach e.V. – cultural and beautification club
- Landfrauenverein Becherbach – countrywomen's club
- Männergesangverein Becherbach – men's singing club
- TuS Becherbach 1910 e.V. – gymnastic and sport club
- Verein der Freunde und Förderer der freiwilligen Feuerwehr e.V. – “friends and promoters” of the volunteer fire brigade
- Wirtschaftlicher Verein Dorfladen Becherbach – village shop commercial association

== Economy and infrastructure ==
=== Transport ===
Running west of Becherbach bei Kirn is Bundesstraße 41. Serving Kirn-Sulzbach is a railway station on the Nahe Valley Railway (Bingen–Saarbrücken).
