= Frédéric Auguste Lichtenberger =

French theologian

Frédéric Auguste Lichtenberger (1832 in Strasbourg – 1899) was a French theologian.

== Biography ==
He obtained his degree in theology, and was made professor at the University of Strasbourg (1864). In 1877 he was appointed professor in the newly founded Protestant faculty at Paris, of which he also became dean. In 1896, he received a D.D. from the University of Glasgow.

== Works ==
Among his written efforts is the "History of German theology in the nineteenth century" (published in English in 1889). Other published works include:

- La théologie de Lessing (1854) – The theology of Lessing.
- De Apostolorum Præceptis Redemptoriam Christi Mortem Spectantibus (1857).
- Étude sur le principe du protestantisme (1857) – Study on the principles of Protestantism.
- Des éléments constitutifs de la science dogmatique (1869) – Constituent elements of dogmatic science.
- Histoire des idées religieuses en Allemagne depuis le milieu du XVIIIème siècle (1873–87) – History of religious ideas in Germany during the middle of the 18th century.
- Encyclopédie des sciences religieuses (13 volumes, 1877–82) – Encyclopedia of religious sciences.

== Family ==
His son, André Lichtenberger, was a noted French novelist and sociologist. Another son, Henri Lichtenberger (1864–1941), founded the modern school of German studies (German: Germanistik) in France.
