= Lichtenburg =

Lichtenburg may refer to:

- Lichtenburg, South Africa, a major town in the North West Province of South Africa
- Lichtenburg concentration camp, a Nazi concentration camp in eastern Germany
- Lichtenburg, a fictional grand duchy in the Balkans, in the 1940 film The Son of Monte Cristo
- Lichtenburg, a fictional European Grand Duchy in Irving Berlin's musical Call Me Madam

== See also ==
- Lichtenberg (disambiguation)
