= Schmidthachenbach =

- Municipality
- Coat of arms

- Location of Schmidthachenbach within Birkenfeld district
- Interactive map of Schmidthachenbach
- Location within Germany Location within Rhineland-Palatinate
- Coordinates: 49°43′52″N 07°28′14″E
- Country: Germany
- State: Rhineland-Palatinate
- District: Birkenfeld
- Municipal assoc.: Herrstein-Rhaunen

Government
  - Mayor (2019–24): Roger Stumm

Area
  - Total: 10.05 km^{2} (3.88 sq mi)
- Elevation: 255 m (837 ft)

Population (2025-12-31)
  - Total: 354
  - Density: 35.2/km^{2} (91.2/sq mi)
- Time zone: UTC+01:00 (CET)
  - Summer (DST): UTC+02:00 (CEST)
- Postal codes: 55758
- Dialling codes: 06757
- Vehicle registration: BIR
- Website: www.schmidthachenbach.de

Schmidthachenbach is an Ortsgemeinde – a municipality belonging to a Verbandsgemeinde, a kind of collective municipality – in the Birkenfeld district in Rhineland-Palatinate, Germany. It belongs to the Verbandsgemeinde Herrstein-Rhaunen, whose seat is in Herrstein.

== Geography ==
=== Location ===
Schmidthachenbach lies in the Großbach valley, a side valley of the Nahe. Half the municipal area is wooded.

=== Neighbouring municipalities ===
Schmidthachenbach borders in the north on the municipality of Heimweiler, in the east on the municipality of Becherbach bei Kirn, in the southeast on the municipality of Otzweiler, in the south on the municipality of Sienhachenbach, in the southwest on the municipality of Oberreidenbach, in the west on the municipality of Mittelreidenbach and in the northwest on the municipality of Bärenbach. The first three and last of Schmidthachenbach's neighbours named here are in the neighbouring district of Bad Kreuznach, while the rest are in the Birkenfeld district. Schmidthachenbach also meets the municipality of Sien to the south at a single point, which is also shared with two other municipalities.

=== Constituent communities ===
Also belonging to Schmidthachenbach are the outlying homesteads of Antesmühle and Forsthaus Antestal.

== History ==
In 1075, Hugo de Hachenfels sold his lands in Olkenbach to Saint Simeon's Monastery at Trier for 260 silver marks in a deed documented by Archbishop of Trier Udo. The Lords of Hachenfels are said to be the village's namesake. In 1112, Cuno de Hachenfels cropped up in a document about an exchange of holdings between Disibodenberg Monastery and Provost Richard von Liebfrauen in Mainz. Named as an occupant of the Hachenburg (an old castle near the Hachenfels) in 1128 was Adalbero de Hachenfels, who also cropped up in a donation document from Archbishop of Mainz Adalbert I to Disibodenberg Monastery. In 1140, Emicho VI's two sons formed the lines of the Waldgraves and Rhinegraves (Konrad) and the Raugraves (Emich VII). It was in this time that a new castle, the Naumburg, was built near Bärenbach, within whose domain lay Schmidthachenbach. In 1172, Emich VII transferred ownership of the Naumburg to his brother Gerlach. In 1323, Raugrave Conrad sold Archbishop of Trier Baldwin the Naumburg for 1200 Heller, whereupon Baldwin enfeoffed Conrad with the very castle that he had just sold.

The year 1361 is important in Schmidthachenbach's history, for this date was to be found on the lintel over the old town hall's door. In 1393, the castle and the Amt of Naumburg fell under the lordship of the Counts of Sponheim, whom the Counts of Oberstein owed allegiance. The Obersteins themselves held the patronage and tithing rights at the parish church at Becherbach, within whose parish lay Schmidthachenbach. This put the village in the “Further” County of Sponheim. In 1439, Wyrich von Dune, Lord of Oberstein, was enfeoffed by the Archbishop of Trier with the castle.

In 1557, the Reformation was introduced into the County of Sponheim. In 1572, Schmidthachenbach had its first documentary mention under the name Hachenbach. In 1599 came the first documentary mention of the Junkerhof within Schmidthachenbach's limits. The owner at the time was Junker Hans Jakob von Dietz, Lord at Mittelreidenbach. In 1618, the Thirty Years' War broke out, and locally, it gave rise to “The Legend of the Sunken Rider”.

In 1707, the Amt of Naumburg was taken over by the Margrave of Baden. Beginning in 1795, Schmidthachenbach lay under French rule and became a mairie (“mayoralty”) in the canton of Grumbach, the arrondissement of Birkenfeld and the Department of Sarre. Beginning in 1798, Schmidthachenbach belonged to the French Republic; in 1800 there were roughly 300 inhabitants. That same year, Johannes Bückler, commonly known as “Schinderhannes”, attacked the Antesmühle, an outlying mill in Schmidthachenbach in the Antes valley.

In 1815, in the wake of Napoleon’s downfall and the Congress of Vienna, French rule ended and Schmidthachenbach found itself in the Duchy of Saxe-Coburg-Saalfeld while remaining a mairie – although now called a Bürgermeisterei, the German word for the same thing – within the constituent territory of the Principality of Lichtenberg with Sankt Wendel as its capital. In 1834, Saxe-Coburg-Saalfeld sold the Principality of Lichtenberg to the Kingdom of Prussia, and it became the Sankt Wendel district. At the time when the German Empire was founded in 1871, Schmidthachenbach had 466 inhabitants. The “Peace Oak” was also planted near the church this year on the occasion of the end of the Franco-Prussian War.

In 1937, in the time of the Third Reich, unlike its two neighbouring municipalities, Schmidthachenbach was grouped into the Birkenfeld district. In 1950, Schmidthachenbach had 498 inhabitants, and this year also marked the end of winegrowing in the municipality. In 1957, Flurbereinigung began. In 1958, a memorial was built and dedicated to those who fell or went missing in the First World War and the Second World War. In the course of administrative restructuring in Rhineland-Palatinate, the Amt of Weierbach was dissolved and Schmidthachenbach was grouped into the Verbandsgemeinde of Herrstein.

== Politics ==
=== Municipal council ===
The council is made up of 8 council members, who were elected by majority vote at the municipal election held on 7 June 2009, and the honorary mayor as chairman.

=== Mayor ===
Schmidthachenbach's mayor is Roger Stumm.

=== Coat of arms ===
The municipality's arms might be described thus: Per pale Or a barrulet sable between an anvil in perspective, the horn to sinister chief, of the same and an oakleaf palewise slipped proper, and countercompony azure and Or.

The charges on the dexter (armsbearer's right, viewer's left) side are an anvil and an oakleaf. The former is canting for the first syllable in the municipality's name (Schmidt comes from the base of Schmiede, meaning “smithy”). It is said that Schmidthachenbach was founded by eight blacksmiths. The latter of the two charges, the oakleaf, represents the natural environment within Schmidthachenbach's limits. The countercompony (that is, two rows of squares of alternating tinctures) pattern is a reference to the village's former allegiance to the Counts of Sponheim, who for centuries ruled the area, and bore arms that were “chequy” (similar, but with more than two rows).

The arms have been borne since 26 August 1963.

== Culture and sightseeing ==
The following are listed buildings or sites in Rhineland-Palatinate’s Directory of Cultural Monuments:

- Evangelical parish church, Kirchpfad – aisleless church, Rundbogenstil, 1848; belltower, 1903, architect August Senz, Düsseldorf; Stumm organ, 1852
- Bachweg 6 – Parallel estate, 19th century
- Bergstraße 5 – Evangelical rectory; building with half-hipped roof, Reform architecture, 1912/1913, architect Friedrich Otto, Kirn
- Kirchpfad 4 – hook-shaped commercial building, sandstone-framed breccia building, barn marked 1872, stable part marked 1883
- Talstraße (parallel to the Großenbach), Lambach pump – pumphouse, spring tapping, well house, cistern, works water storage pit, 1911

== Economy and infrastructure ==
Running west of the municipality is Bundesstraße 41. Serving nearby Kirn-Sulzbach is a railway station on the Nahe Valley Railway (Bingen–Saarbrücken).
