= Otzweiler =

- Municipality
- Coat of arms

- Location of Otzweiler within Bad Kreuznach district
- Interactive map of Otzweiler
- Location within Germany Location within Rhineland-Palatinate
- Coordinates: 49°42′46″N 07°30′33″E
- Country: Germany
- State: Rhineland-Palatinate
- District: Bad Kreuznach
- Municipal assoc.: Kirner Land

Government
  - Mayor (2019–24): Natalie Kleyer

Area
  - Total: 3.11 km^{2} (1.20 sq mi)
- Elevation: 300 m (980 ft)

Population (2025-12-31)
  - Total: 190
  - Density: 61/km^{2} (160/sq mi)
- Time zone: UTC+01:00 (CET)
  - Summer (DST): UTC+02:00 (CEST)
- Postal codes: 55606
- Dialling codes: 06757
- Vehicle registration: KH

Otzweiler is an Ortsgemeinde – a municipality belonging to a Verbandsgemeinde, a kind of collective municipality – in the Bad Kreuznach district in Rhineland-Palatinate, Germany. It belongs to the Verbandsgemeinde Kirner Land, whose seat is in the town of Kirn.

== Geography ==
=== Location ===
Otzweiler lies on the Großbach in the North Palatine Uplands. It borders on two neighbouring districts, Kusel and Birkenfeld.

=== Neighbouring municipalities ===
Clockwise from the north, Otzweiler's neighbours are the municipalities of Becherbach bei Kirn and Limbach, both of which likewise lie within the Bad Kreuznach district, the municipality of Hoppstädten in the neighbouring Kusel district and the municipalities of Sien, Sienhachenbach (although this boundary is confined to one point) and Schmidthachenbach in the neighbouring Birkenfeld district.

== History ==
From the Early and High Middle Ages, little is known about Otzweiler. In the 14th century, Otzweiler belonged to the Lordship of the Waldgraves at the Kyrburg (castle). In 1375, the Waldgraves Otto and Friedrich of Kyrburg shared out landholds and rights between themselves that they owned in the Amt of Otzweiler, which also comprised, among other places, Hundsbach, Schweinschied and Löllbach. Historian Wilhelm Fabricius presumed that the village had arisen from a Waldgravial estate in the court region of Becherbach and that it had originally belonged to the Hochgericht auf der Heide (“High Court on the Heath”). Otzweiler, which was then made up of only this estate and two mills, grew over time into a bigger settlement. In the early 16th century, the village belonged to the Schultheißerei of Sien within the Waldgravial Amt of Kyrburg. Since there were also Sponheim subjects living in Otzweiler, the Counts of Sponheim and later their rightful successor, the Margrave of Baden, maintained a claim to territorial ascendancy over the village as holders of the Amt of Naumburg. The disagreements over rights arising from this between the Amt of Salen-Kyrburg and the Badish Amt of Naumburg were arbitrated in 1757 so that the landholds and the inhabitants of Otzweiler would remain under the joint administration of both Ämter. The inhabitants only had a unified administration when the French Revolutionary rulers assigned Otzweiler to the newly created Mairie (“Mayoralty”) of Schmidthachenbach in the Canton of Grumbach. After the end of the by then Napoleonic French rule in 1814, there was a short period of Prussian rule after which Otzweiler passed in 1816 to the Oberschultheißerei of Hundsbach in the Hesse-Homburg Oberamt of Meisenheim. In the early 1820s, this body's seat moved from Hundsbach to Becherbach bei Kirn, where the Amt administration responsible for Otzweiler remained until 1940. Then, the Amt of Becherbach was dissolved and Otzweiler passed to the Amt of Kirn-Land. It remains in the Verbandsgemeinde of that same name today. In 1864, there were 71 families living in 57 houses in Otzweiler. The greater part of the population of this village of more than 300 inhabitants was Evangelical.

=== Criminal history ===
Like many places in the region, Otzweiler can claim to have had its dealings with the notorious outlaw Schinderhannes (or Johannes Bückler, to use his true name). On 11 January 1800, Schinderhannes committed a robbery and murder in Otzweiler, thereafter making good his escape to the Rhine’s right bank.

=== Population development ===
Otzweiler’s population development since Napoleonic times is shown in the table below. The figures for the years from 1871 to 1987 are drawn from census data:

| Year | Inhabitants |
|---|---|
| 1815 | 174 |
| 1835 | N.A. |
| 1871 | 342 |
| 1905 | 261 |
| 1939 | 247 |

| Year | Inhabitants |
|---|---|
| 1950 | 229 |
| 1961 | 277 |
| 1970 | 314 |
| 1987 | 246 |
| 2005 | 215 |

== Religion ==
As at 30 November 2013, there are 206 full-time residents in Otzweiler, and of those, 159 are Evangelical (77.184%), 26 are Catholic (12.621%), 2 (0.971%) belong to other religious groups and 19 (9.223%) either have no religion or will not reveal their religious affiliation.

== Politics ==
=== Municipal council ===
The council is made up of 6 council members, who were elected by majority vote at the municipal election held on 7 June 2009, and the honorary mayor as chairman.

=== Mayor ===
Otzweiler's mayor is Natalie Kleyer.

=== Coat of arms ===
The German blazon reads: Über blau-golden geschachtem Schildfuß in Silber ein roter Mühlstein belegt mit einem goldenen Mühleisen.

The municipality's arms might in English heraldic language be described thus: Per fess argent a millstone gules charged with a millrind palewise Or, and chequy azure and Or.

The “chequy” pattern in the lower field is a reference to the village's former allegiance to the “Further” County of Sponheim. The millstone and the millrind recall the village's beginnings. According to the Reverend Otto Lentze in his book Amt Naumburg und Pfarrei Becherbach (p. 31), Otzweiler was in 1599 only an estate with two mills, and had earlier long been only one mill. Municipal council, on 3 February 1966, gave the graphic artist Brust from Kirn-Sulzbach the task of designing a municipal coat of arms. At a council meeting on 8 June 1966, council adopted the design that had been put forth. After consent by the state archive, the Ministry of the Interior in Mainz granted approval for Otzweiler to bear its own arms on 4 July 1966. The municipal banner also bears this coat of arms in the centre.

== Culture and sightseeing ==
=== Buildings ===
The following are listed buildings or sites in Rhineland-Palatinate’s Directory of Cultural Monuments:

- Bergstraße 5 – estate complex along the street; Late Classicist quarrystone buildings, marked 1865
- Brückenstraße 6 – hook-shaped estate; Late Classicist hewn-stone building, marked 1867
- Kirner Straße – warriors’ memorial 1914–1918; cast-stone, 1920s

=== Clubs ===
The following clubs are active in Otzweiler:

- Förderverein der freiwilligen Feuerwehr Otzweiler — volunteer fire brigade promotional association
- Jugendtreff “Eckstübbche Otzweiler” e.V. — youth meeting place
- Landfrauen Otzweiler — countrywomen's club
- SV Otzweiler — sport club
- Tramp-Club e.V.

== Economy and infrastructure ==
=== Transport ===
Otzweiler lies at the junction of Kreisstraße 70 and Landesstraße 374. The former leads northeastwards to neighbouring Hundsbach. The latter leads southwards to a junction with Bundesstraße 270 in neighbouring Sien. This in turn leads northwestwards to Fischbach, where there is a junction with Bundesstraße 41, and southeastwards to Lauterecken, where there is a junction with Bundesstraße 420. Landesstraße 374 also leads northwestwards from Otzweiler to a junction with Landesstraße 182, which leads onwards to Kirn, where one can board a train on the Nahe Valley Railway (Bingen–Saarbrücken). The travel time on the hourly Regionalexpress trains to Saarbrücken is 1 hour and 10 minutes, while Mainz can be reached in just under an hour. Every other train to and from Frankfurt also runs through to Frankfurt Airport.
