= Cornel Popa =

Cornel Popa may refer to:

- Cornel Popa (director) (1932–2008), Romanian film and television director
- Cornel Popa (footballer) (1935–1999), Romanian footballer
- Cornel Popa (politician) (b. 1951), Romanian politician
