= Sienhachenbach =

- Municipality
- Coat of arms

- Location of Sienhachenbach within Birkenfeld district
- Interactive map of Sienhachenbach
- Location within Germany Location within Rhineland-Palatinate
- Coordinates: 49°42′04″N 07°29′00″E
- Country: Germany
- State: Rhineland-Palatinate
- District: Birkenfeld
- Municipal assoc.: Herrstein-Rhaunen

Government
  - Mayor (2019–24): Dietmar Fritz

Area
  - Total: 7.60 km^{2} (2.93 sq mi)
- Elevation: 330 m (1,080 ft)

Population (2025-12-31)
  - Total: 180
  - Density: 24/km^{2} (61/sq mi)
- Time zone: UTC+01:00 (CET)
  - Summer (DST): UTC+02:00 (CEST)
- Postal codes: 55758
- Dialling codes: 06788
- Vehicle registration: BIR

Sienhachenbach is an Ortsgemeinde – a municipality belonging to a Verbandsgemeinde, a kind of collective municipality – in the Birkenfeld district in Rhineland-Palatinate, Germany. It belongs to the Verbandsgemeinde Herrstein-Rhaunen, whose seat is in Herrstein.

== Geography ==
=== Location ===
The residential community of Sienhachenbach lies between Idar-Oberstein and Lauterecken northeast of the Baumholder troop drilling ground.

=== Neighbouring municipalities ===
Sienhachenbach borders in the north on the municipality of Schmidthachenbach, in the east on the municipality of Sien, in the south on the Baumholder troop drilling ground and in the west on the municipality of Oberreidenbach. Sienhachenbach also meets the municipality of Otzweiler at a single point in the northeast.

=== Constituent communities ===
Also belonging to Sienhachenbach is the outlying homestead of Forsthaus Antestal.

== History ==
In 1508, Sienhachenbach had its first documentary mention.

== Politics ==
=== Municipal council ===
The council is made up of 6 council members, who were elected by majority vote at the municipal election held on 7 June 2009, and the honorary mayor as chairman.

=== Mayor ===
Sienhachenbach's mayor is Dietmar Fritz.

=== Coat of arms ===
The municipality's arms might be described thus: Per bend vert in sinister a bend sinister wavy and in base a village fountain, both argent, and Or a lion rampant gules armed and langued azure.

== Culture and sightseeing ==
=== Buildings ===
The following are listed buildings or sites in Rhineland-Palatinate's Directory of Cultural Monuments:

- Hofgartenstraße 3 – so-called Zehnthof ("Tithe Estate"); walled estate complex, marked 1729; house marked 1823, essentially possibly from the 18th century

=== Community centre ===
In 1968, the community centre was dedicated. It is the hub of the community's cultural life and is used by the local clubs. The Evangelical church holds services here on certain church holidays, for there is no church in the village. Often, the building, which is equipped with a small room and a large room, is used for family celebrations, public events and course offerings from the folk high school.

=== Clubs ===
- Men's singing club (founded in 1921) and women's choir (founded in 1987)
- Volunteer fire brigade (founded in 1939) and promotional association
- Freizeitclub e.V. ("Freedom Club"; founded in 1979)

== Economy and infrastructure ==
Sien lies on Bundesstraße 270. Serving nearby Lauterecken is a railway station on the Lautertalbahn (Kaiserslautern–Lauterecken).
