= Lichtenberg Castle =

Lichtenberg Castle may refer to:

== France ==
- Château de Lichtenberg, Bas-Rhin, Alsace

== Germany ==
- Lichtenberg Castle (Palatinate), Kusel, Rhineland-Palatinate
- Lichtenberg Castle (Oberstenfeld), Oberstenfeld, Baden-Wuerttemberg
- Lichtenberg Castle (Salzgitter), Lower Saxony
- Schloss Lichtenberg (Hessen), a castle in Hesse

== Italy ==
- Castle Lichtenberg (Prad), Prad am Stilfser Joch, a castle of South Tyrol

== Netherlands ==
- Castle ruins of Lichtenberg, Mount Saint Peter, Maastricht
