= Löllbach =

- Municipality
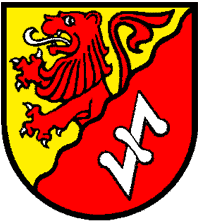
- Coat of arms

- Location of Löllbach within Bad Kreuznach district
- Interactive map of Löllbach
- Location within Germany Location within Rhineland-Palatinate
- Coordinates: 49°41′20″N 7°35′35″E
- Country: Germany
- State: Rhineland-Palatinate
- District: Bad Kreuznach
- Municipal assoc.: Nahe-Glan

Government
  - Mayor (2019–24): Thomas Helfenstein

Area
  - Total: 4.94 km^{2} (1.91 sq mi)
- Elevation: 208 m (682 ft)

Population (2025-12-31)
  - Total: 181
  - Density: 36.6/km^{2} (94.9/sq mi)
- Time zone: UTC+01:00 (CET)
  - Summer (DST): UTC+02:00 (CEST)
- Postal codes: 67744
- Dialling codes: 06753
- Vehicle registration: KH
- Website: www.loellbach.de

Löllbach (German pronunciation: [ˈlœlbax]) is an Ortsgemeinde – a municipality belonging to a Verbandsgemeinde, a kind of collective municipality – in the Bad Kreuznach district in Rhineland-Palatinate, Germany. It belongs to the Verbandsgemeinde Nahe-Glan, whose seat is in Bad Sobernheim.

== Geography ==
=== Location ===
Löllbach is a typical clump village and lies between Lauterecken and Meisenheim, off the major traffic routes, in the North Palatine Uplands at an elevation of 208 m (682 ft) above mean sea level. Running through the village is the Jeckenbach, and emptying into it in the village core is the Schweinschieder Bach. The municipal area measures 494 hectares (1,220 acres).

=== Neighbouring municipalities ===
Clockwise from the north, Löllbach's neighbours are the municipalities of Jeckenbach and Breitenheim, which likewise lie within the Bad Kreuznach district, the municipalities of Medard and Kappeln, which lie in the neighbouring Kusel district, and the municipality of Schweinschied, also in the Bad Kreuznach district.

=== Constituent communities ===
Also belonging to Löllbach are the outlying homesteads of Alte Ölmühle and Altheckmühle.

== History ==
=== Prehistory ===
Some 5,000 years ago, the Löllbach area lay in trackless wilderness. The mountains were covered in old-growth forest, and most of the dales were marshy. It was at about this time, though, that the first humans set foot here, nomadic hunter-gatherer folk, whose feet made the first human paths through the area, although these would not have looked very different from trails made by the deer. In the rural cadastral area known as the “Lagerstück” near Löllbach, a stone hatchet and a sharp-edged arrowhead were unearthed, which these early hunters would not have been happy to lose. Only 2,000 years later, thus about 3000 BC, scattered bits of tribe from far away made themselves at home on the local heights at homesteads. They already knew about the metals tin and copper, and the alloy that could be made from them: bronze. Iron was then still unknown to them. Knowledge of these people's presence comes from the graves that they left behind, barrows, known in German, not altogether accurately, as Hünengräber or “Huns’ graves”. These can be found in the Striedter Wald (forest), as well as in other places in the area. These Bronze Age dwellers had also learnt the rudiments of cropraising. These people were succeeded by the great Celtic tribes who came into the area from northern France and northern Germany to settle across their vast new homeland stretching to the northern edge of the Alps. They, too, worked the land and raised livestock, although they hunted as well. Archaeological finds have also shown that they had also mastered pottery along with bronze and iron casting. In their time, the Löllbach area was already widely settled with homesteads in hillside glades. In their struggle with Germanic peoples who had crossed the Rhine, the Celts fled for shelter behind the ringwalls at their refuge castles that they had built on mountaintops: Marialskopf near Medard, Raumberg, Donnersberg, and many others. The Celts, however, were outnumbered and melded with the victors, with the result being the Treveri, a people of mixed Celtic and Germanic stock, from whom the Latin name for the city of Trier, Augusta Treverorum, is also derived.

=== Antiquity ===
In the 1st century BC, the rulers of the Western World at that time, the Romans, had incorporated Gaul into their empire as a new colony. When the Treveri now once again found themselves beset by the Germanic hordes, they called on the Roman general and conqueror of Gaul, Julius Caesar, for help. In 58 BC, he drove the Germanic peoples back across the Rhine. Nevertheless, the Treveri were hardly spared foreign rule, as the Romans remained in their land as rulers for the next 500 years with the Rhine as the Imperial frontier to be guarded against the Germanic peoples that they had driven out. From their stronghold at Trier, supplies rolled through the Löllbach area to the frontier, but not before the old wilderness paths gave way to paved roads leading across the heights. Thus did the Roman roads come into being. These would have carried all manner of traffic, from marching legions to commercial wagons to dignified Roman ladies hurrying to their husbands in some garrison town on the Rhine. Here and there on each side of the Roman roads, however, on the hillsides, lay Roman villare, proud lordly seats. They were extensive farms taken from the defeated Celto-Germanic people that the Romans had then granted long-serving legionnaires as a reward – and also to ensure their continued hegemony. Celts worked the land there and served their Roman masters. One such Roman estate is known to have lain near where the church now stands in neighbouring Medard, but there were definitely several others in the area. Besides the Roman roads and the Roman monument near Schweinschied, many other Roman finds bear witness to a great number of Romans having lived in the area. Near Löllbach, in the rural cadastral area known as the “Lochwiese”, a Löllbach farmer unearthed a so-called Viergötterstein (a “four-god stone”, a pedestal on which a Jupiter Column was customarily stood) in 1872. This is now kept at a museum in Worms. Some people from Löllbach have also found Roman coins. About AD 450, the Romans had to withdraw their forces from the Rhine into the Gaulish backlands. Another Germanic tribe, this time the Franks, was threatening the Romans with superior military might. Not everyone withdrew from the area, however. The subject people, the Treveri, stayed behind, as did landed Roman families. The invading Franks, however, arranged for themselves to become the new lords and for these remaining people to be a “host people” who would serve their new lords. Later, both Celts and Romans would be assimilated into the body of the Frankish people.

=== Middle Ages ===
==== Frankish times ====
The Franks who were thronging into the land came with kith and kin, with plough and seed. First, they settled the dales, where the best soil was. More of their kin came in fits and starts. They were driving westwards, first fighting, but then setting their ploughs to the new earth. Wherever a group's leader staked a claim, there was where the cabins arose. These tiny settlements were often named after an early leader. This is so for nearly all villages with names ending in —heim. In this way, the Franks conquered the whole of Francia. All the new land belonged to the king. He divided the empire up into Gaue and named one of his stalwarts the gaugrave (Gaugraf i.e. "Gau count") to each Gau. He administered the king's Gau, reaped the income from it for him, made the law and in times of war, raised armies for him. There were also subordinate viscounts who ran smaller areas, and below them even lower nobles. They, too, lived at castles. From the Hunsrück deep into the Palatinate stretched the Nahegau. Löllbach lay in the middle. Beginning in 926, the Nahegaugraf (the count) was living at the newly built Kyrburg (castle). Beginning in 943, the title of gaugrave became hereditary. This led to the counts and viscounts sharing out their estates to their children. More and more, they also began to view the land as their own. From the partitions arose several lines of comital families. Locally, these were the Houses of Kyrburg, Wildburg and Dhaun. Because the king had granted them the oversight of the great forests in the Soonwald and the Winterhauch, they called themselves the Wildgrafen (“Waldgraves” in English). The Counts of Veldenz, too, who held a castle on the Moselle had formed by splitting away from the gaugraves, and then came, among others, the Raugraves in the Alsenz valley. The formerly free people, however, became less and less free. Their lives and bodies, along with all that they had, belonged to the lord at the castle, an arrangement known as serfdom. Because counts and lords were locked in a seemingly endless struggle with each other over their feudal rights, there was always feuding, and the serfs were often the ones who paid the price, by being mishandled, robbed, murdered and having their homes set ablaze by soldiers. The impoverished serfs were even bereft of any pleasure in life by the toll that their lords took on them in the shape of tithes and unfree labour.

==== Waldgravial times ====
In 1319, Löllbach had its first documentary mention when a document from the Hochgericht auf der Heide (“High Court on the Heath”) named a village called Leubilbach. Löllbach belonged to this court throughout the Middle Ages. The lords of the court were the Waldgraves. A high court district roughly equalled a Frankish hundred. The High Court on the Heath comprised the whole area of the Winterhauch between the Nahe and the Glan, this according to the boundaries laid down for it in many Weistümer (singular: Weistum; cognate with English wisdom, these were legal pronouncements issued by men learned in law in the Middle Ages and early modern times). The boundary ran from Oberstein down the Nahe as far as Hachenfels (a castle named in 1075), thence by way of Otzweiler to Hundsbach, Schweinschied, Löllbach, Udencappeln and Grumbach to Lauterecken. From here, the Glan was the boundary as far as the point where it was joined by the Steinalb. This brook then formed the boundary with the High Court of Baumholder, and near Breungenborn (now vanished; its former site now lies within the Baumholder Troop Drilling Ground), it merged with the Nahegau's border, then running concurrently with it back to Oberstein. All together, the High Court on the Heath at Sien comprised 50 villages with an area of 18 041 ha. Löllbach belonged with Schweinschied and part of Sien together with the estates to the Kyrburg-Waldgravial Amtsbezirk of Sien-Löllbach. For a time, a man from Löllbach held the post of Amt Schultheiß, bearing witness to which is the gravestone built into the church wall in memory of Johann Ludwig Meurer. In the 14th century, the Waldgraves of Kyrburg bought the one part of the village that they had for some unknown reason sold, back from the knightly family of Frey in Oberwesel. It was indeed a specific geographical area in the village rather than a share of the feudal rights, and it lay in the village's north end, a part of the village mit der Kapelle (“with the chapel”). Soon afterwards, though, some of the houses there were granted to Zymar von Sponheim, known as Mandel, perhaps because he was enfeoffed with Mannendal (now Mandel near Bad Kreuznach), a village that belonged to the Knights of Bolanden. The Waldgraves then enfeoffed a Mulenstein von Grumbach, who might have been in the service of the Waldgraves of Grumbach, with the other houses in this part of the village. From 1515 on, however, this whole part of the village was once more under Waldgravial administration. The case was quite different for the southeastern part of the village and the houses there on the right banks of the brooks. In the 14th century, they belonged to the Amt of Naumburg near Becherbach. Only in 1757 did this “Palatine side” pass to the Waldgraves and Rhinegraves of Salm-Kyrburg. Löllbach, along with most of its homesteads, was thus throughout almost the whole of the Middle Ages bound together in its historical fate with the Waldgraviate of Kyrburg.

==== Life and taxes under feudalism ====
In the Middle Ages, the counts or their fiefholders, by way of the Schultheißen and with help from the Vögte, drew income owed by the peasants. This was destined partly for themselves, but also partly for their lords, the Waldgraves. These payments were what would be called taxes today. The heftiest among these was der große Zehnt – “the great tithe”. The knight's Vogt came by horse right onto the field and set aside the ten best sheaves for the lord. All other obligations had been laid down long before in the municipality's Weistum. These were read out yearly on New Year's Day, the day when the thing was held. The lordship needed everything, from hay for horse fodder to honey for their dining tables to beeswax for their candles. It goes without saying that they also needed goose feathers, flax and finished linens, along with eggs, fattened geese (for Martinmas), and also Shrovetide chickens, flitches of bacon and smoked meat, all of which had to be delivered on particular days throughout the year. The lord's tithe barns with their cellars and storage rooms are still in living memory in Löllbach. Older villagers remember that one stood in what is now Karl Herrmann's garden. It may well have reached across the modern street, Schweinschieder Weg, for behind the municipally owned memorial square is today still found a cellar from the old Kyrburg landhold. The other tithe barn stood in what is now the Family Paulus's small front garden, just outside the school windows. It, too, would have been of quite a size. Der kleine Zehnt – “the little tithe” – had to be paid, for example, on the occasion of a wedding, while after a family head's death, the so-called Besthaupt (“best head”) was payable, wherein the heirs took the best head of livestock from the stable – meaning the one that was worth the most – to be paid as a kind of death duty. It should not be overlooked that the exact terms of taxation were not always pursued with the utmost insistence. There are known cases in which judicious lords supported the bereaved with benevolence and charity in special cases. Responsible for oversight and management under the terms of the Weistum was the Schultheiß. Above him was the Oberamt administration in Kirn. His yearly remuneration was 12 Rhenish guilders, 5 Albus, 8 Malter of corn (likely either wheat or rye), three Malter of oats; he was also accorded personal and material freedom. If the taxes were manifold and high, more burdensome still was the unfree labour also laid down in the Weistum. The lord's livestock grazed on the “Herrenwasem”. Parts of this field were also laid out as a cropfield. It was the lord who reaped the field's yield, but the peasant was the one who did all the unpaid work. The same was true over at the “Herrenberg”, the lord's vineyards. Indeed, all work in the fields and vineyards was done as compulsory labour on the lord's orders, and it was overseen by the Vogt (reeve). One only needs to look carefully at the land to see clearly where the pond could have lain. There, the lord's carp were big, and at Shrovetide, the pond was fished clean to fill the lord's table. Of course, all the fishing and other jobs done at the pond were also unfree work. It is likely that the reeve and the count guessed that this work led to the odd carp landing on a peasant's table. Unfree labour done for the lord came before one's own farming, of course, meaning that the peasants’ own harvest was often rained out or because of the inevitable neglect otherwise spoilt. Even the unfree workers’ food and drink were often laid down in the Weistum. Everything done for the lord was unpaid: building the lord's castle; repairing walls and paths; transporting stone; lugging the tithes to the Kyrburg; supplying young boys and girls to work at the castle; running the lord's errands from castle to castle.

=== Modern times ===
==== Wars in early modern times ====
The everyday people suffered unspeakably under the lords’ countless feuds. Then there were the hardships brought on by the great wars. Particularly dreadful was the devastation brought about by the Thirty Years' War (1618-1648). Waldgravial territory was invaded and villages set afire by General Marquis Ambrogio Spinola's (1569–1630) Imperial-Spanish troops, then by the Swedes, then by the Imperial Croats, and next by the French armies and last of all once again by the Spaniards. The people were left destitute by these armies’ neverending demands for contributions. More dreadful yet was the toll in lives, with the ordeal leaving many dead. Most villages in the area only had a few people left, for sicknesses brought along with the marauding armies, foremost among them the Plague, were rife among the populace. In the Oberamt of Kyrburg, supposedly only one fifth of the prewar population was left. Some villages had died right out, often with only rubble left to mark where they had lain. It is furthermore said that within the whole Amt of Kusel, there was only one cow. Ploughing had to be done with human power. Growing in the fields were thorny bushes. The churches had been pillaged, and all houses destroyed. Long after the war, roaming soldiers were still a serious and dangerous problem, with some now left with no homeland, and others hoping for more war. Especially worrisome were marauders from Lorraine, the remnants of a defeated army. Then, soon afterwards, came a great many men to the area between the Nahe and the Glan. The many widows took men as husbands who had kept out of the war. It was particularly from the Tyrol that the cohorts of men came, many of them supposedly skilful craftsmen. Even today, many of their family names are still found in the Löllbach area, such as “Gehres”, “Gravius”, “Gutensohn” and “Lamneck”, among others. After thirty more years, the war's wounds began to heal. The population had once again grown. Nevertheless, there came more wars, more horrors, more bloodshed. In the last century of Waldgravial governance, too, the 18th century, the Kyrburg Ämter, and thereby Löllbach too, had to bear great distress. Once more, wars – the War of the Spanish Succession (1701-1714) and the War of the Polish Succession (1733-1738) – brought hardship. Each time, the French overran the land, exacted contributions, swept through the country and ate the locals out of house and home. In June and July 1734 came a most significant event for the county when the French managed to destroy the Kyrburg. They tore it down into rubble, believing that it could have been used by their foes. Like all German princes, the Waldgraves, too, were infected with an overwhelming propensity towards French fashions and ways of living. Many of them lived in Paris most of the time and left the job of governance to their underlings. These people, though, had their hands full with the parvenus, supplying them with enough money, a burden that weighed on the poor's backs. They also had to raise funds for the ostentatious buildings that were built after the French pattern, for instance the Schlösser in Dhaun, Kirn and elsewhere. Standing as a notable exception among the lords of the Waldgraviate was Prince Johann Albert Dominik von Salm-Kyrburg, who was honoured as a thrifty, caring housemaster to the local people. His nephew, however, was less well endowed in this way, being more of a dandy who spent nearly all his time on French estates. It is thus little wonder that the French Revolution sucked him into the eddies of popular disgust with the old ruling class. He was beheaded by guillotine on 20 July 1794.

==== French Revolutionary and Napoleonic times ====
Beginning in 1793, the French were once more in the country. This time, it was French Revolutionary troops. They claimed to have come to bless the poor German people with the achievements of their Revolution: liberté, égalité, fraternité. Serfdom, which some time before this had already been relaxed somewhat, was now swept away utterly. It was also good that the still-ruling feudal lordships were now beginning to totter. The blessings that the French had promised, though, did not differ markedly from what the local people had been used to under their old lords. The Revolutionary troops, too, were every bit as disposed to use monstrous means to maintain themselves. The liberty poles that had been put up in Kirn, Sobernheim, Meisenheim without the people's help could not hide the truth: that one burden had merely been exchanged for another. In the Treaty of Campo Formio of 17 October 1797, the Emperor, in his country's (Austria's) name, agreed to a secret article that ceded the Rhine’s left bank to French sovereignty. Systematically, the French occupied the areas forsaken by the Austrians, eventually reaching their goal: the Rhine itself, now the border between France and Germany. On 7 March 1798, the organizational commissioner, Rudler, sent forth a proclamation declaring that the Principality of Salm-Kirburg, the old Waldgraviate, was henceforth part of the French Republic. With the coming of the French Revolutionary army, a whole new administrative order was imposed on the German lands on the Rhine’s left bank based on the Revolutionary French model. The local region between the Saar, the Nahe and the Glan was covered mostly by the new Department of Sarre. The Arrondissement of Birkenfeld comprised several cantons, including the Canton of Meisenheim. From the town hall flew the blue-white-red tricolour. This canton comprised four mairies (“mayoralties”) in the gore of land between the Nahe and the Glan. Belonging to the Mairie of Meisenheim were the following communes: Breitenheim, Jeckenbach, Löllbach, Schweinschied, Desloch, Lauschied, Abtweiler, Raumbach, Medard and Meisenheim itself. From the time of this new order, Löllbach's fate was inextricably tied to Meisenheim's. The resentment felt by the villagers towards the foreign invaders grew immeasurably when the French began to hail a new emperor: Napoleon. Soon, though, people in Löllbach and other nearby villages not only resented the French, but cursed them as young men were conscripted into the French army to go and fight in the ice and snow in the emperor's ill-fated Russian campaign. Many never came back. French rule was swept away only in the wars of liberation in 1812–1815. It is unknown how many men from Löllbach fought in these wars.

==== Post-Napoleonic times ====
At the 1815 Congress of Vienna, the Canton of Meisenheim, with a small addition – later the Oberamt of Meisenheim – was assigned to the lesser Landgrave of Hesse-Homburg. By inheritance, the Oberamt passed in 1866 to the Grand Duke of Hesse-Darmstadt. Before that year had ended though, the Oberamt passed once again to a new authority, this time the Kingdom of Prussia, for the soldiers from Löllbach had fought on the losing side in the Austro-Prussian War. From the Oberamt now arose the Prussian Meisenheim district. Back then, schoolchildren from Löllbach sang: “Ich bin ein Preuße, kennt ihr meine Farben? Die Fahne schwebt mir schwarz und weiß voran…” (“I am a Prussian, do you know my colours? The flag waves black and white before me…”). To this day, a black-and-white-ringed flagstaff can still be found at the school storage building as a memento of these “glorious Prussian” years. The Löllbach villagers became Prussians just in time to find themselves drawn into the Franco-Prussian War in 1870. Four men from Löllbach were in it. Their names hung until the 1930s in decorative picture frames at the old church hall. During their lifetimes they were esteemed as war veterans.

==== Imperial times ====
After this war, more wealth finally came to the people, which may well have owed itself to the incipient industrialization. Farmers benefited from greater crop yields brought about by the introduction of Professor Hermann von Liebig's artificial fertilizer. At that time, all the village's little barns were given upper floors. The village's few worker families, too, benefited more and more from the social attainments that trade unions wrested for them from the late feudal powers. It was “good times”. A glass of beer then cost 10 ₰, and in school, children sang: “Der Kaiser ist ein lieber Mann…” (“The Emperor is a dear man…”). They would have been better off, though, had they never sung this. In 1914, the Emperor took them into the First World War. Anyone who cares to read the names on Löllbach's warriors’ memorial can get a sense of the pain, woes and tears that this event brought the villagers.

==== Weimar times and the Third Reich ====
The 1919 Treaty of Versailles with its heavy reparations stirred up resentment among Germans, and sometimes even vengeful feeling. When the neediness arose from a general lack of work, all Adolf Hitler needed to do was to blow on the embers. In Imperial Germany, people had been drawn into blind nationalism. It had been then believed that anyone who made nationalistic speeches was a noble person. It is therefore little wonder that Hitler found so many followers throughout Weimar Germany, even in Löllbach and other nearby villages. His promises were believed, and his intentions and laws, right up to the Enabling Act and the Third Reich's racist decrees, were blindly accepted, and the Weimar Republic, which had never had an effective democracy, was swept aside. In 1932, the Meisenheim district, in which Löllbach lay, was dissolved and merged into the Kreuznach district. The German people developed productive values under Hitler, who all the while was preparing the country for war. Country folk, too, did their share of this work as part of the Nazi Erzeugungsschlacht (“Battle for Production”) policy, increasing agricultural production while never realizing the direction in which Hitler was taking them. In 1939, the Second World War broke out. It claimed more victims than the First World War, among Löllbach's men as well. Once again, men from every age group, from tenderest youth to older men who headed households, had to give their lives.

==== Since the Second World War ====
Germany's subsequent frightful collapse in this war led to the loss of its reputation in the world. Those men who had survived the fighting as prisoners of war returned to a homeland that had reached its nadir. Both economic and political reconstruction were sorely needed. Innovations in village life meant first mechanization in agriculture, and then great improvements in transport with buses and cars. Later, Hauptschule was introduced in nearby Meisenheim. Better education and training had to be ensured.

=== Jewish history ===
Löllbach once had a small Jewish community that was actually an offshoot of the Jewish community in Hundsbach. See the relevant sections of that article for the community's history and information about its synagogue. What Löllbach can claim as its own, though, is a Jewish graveyard, about which very little is known. It was the burying ground for the very few Jewish households in Löllbach (three families were mentioned in 1807 with the following heads: Herz Nathan, Jacob Wolff and Daniel Cahen; six Jewish inhabitants were counted in 1867). It is believed that the graveyard was used in the 18th and 19th centuries. Until a few years ago, there were still gravestones there, but a report from December 2002 stated that there were then only two gravestone fragments left. A visit in May 2003 turned up no stones at all. As for the graveyard's location, the municipality's mayor, Harry Schneider, identifies it as lying west of Kappeler Weg in the cadastral area known as “Dähältgen”.

=== Municipality’s name ===
From the name Leubilbach, which appeared in the 1319 court document (see above), it is very hard to say anything about the village's age. Any interpretation is most uncertain. According to Professor Ernst Christmann of Kaiserslautern, who greatly concerned himself with placename research, villages with names ending in —bach (“brook”) arose at many different times over the centuries. There are old ones that date from Celtic times, whereas others have arisen much more recently. Most, though, arose as outlying daughter settlements of Frankish villages in the 7th or 8th century. This came about when the original Frankish centres outgrew their loess soils and young, marriageable farmers began clearing goodly areas of old-growth forest for expanded farmland. The new centre in each case was often given the first settler's name with the ending —bach, as had it also been with the places with names ending in —heim. Thus, Frankelbach can be interpreted as “Franko’s brook”, for instance. In other instances, though, the brook itself already bore a name, perhaps suggested by some characteristic, and then the new village simply took the brook's name. An example of this would be Kaulbach, whose first syllable comes from the same root as the German word Kugel (“sphere”, “ball”), a reference to stone orbs found in the brook itself. Neighbouring Kreimbach drew its name from Krähen – crows. The places on the Jeckenbach likewise took their names from the brook. Jecken— springs from the same root as the word jackern, or to use the Modern High German form, jagen (“hunt”). For Leubil – there are rural cadastral areas in Palatine municipalities with names such as “Leusbil” and “Leisbil” – Professor Christmann offered the following interpretation: leusen or leisen means “hearken” or “listen”; as for bil or bül, this refers to a hill. If put together, leubil might mean a height from which watch was kept, a watch post. From this height, however, the stretch of the brook that passes by in the dale might have got its name. And in the end, a clearing, and the settlement therein might have got their name from the brook. If this interpretation holds true, then it can be further concluded that Leubilbach was founded at the earliest in the 7th or 8th century as a small outlying settlement – perhaps from Meisenheim. This, however, would not exclude the existence of the odd homestead dating from even longer ago on the surrounding heights, as the settlement patterns in the region are known from evidence to have become villagelike only quite late. The dales were also long uninhabited, and often marshy right into the Late Middle Ages. It was only rather late that bigger settlements arose in these dales. One can thus be sure that Leubilbach was long a small settlement with only a few homesteads. As if to confirm this, a 1698 compilation record from the Oberamt of Kyrburg states that the village then had 18 households (it also listed 12 in Schweinschied, 2 in Otzweiler and 15 in Sien along with its farms). Today's core village around the schoolhouse together with a few farms across the brook might well be called Alt-Löllbach (“Old Löllbach”). One would, though, have had to include the lordly estate mill in that grouping. On the other hand, the lordly estate lay in the village's west, perhaps even outside it. That there was indeed an estate, perhaps a lordly estate, is strongly suggested by the surviving rural cadastral name “Auf dem Hof” (“On the Estate”).

=== Population development ===
Löllbach's population development since Napoleonic times is shown in the table below. The figures for the years from 1871 to 1987 are drawn from census data:

| Year | Inhabitants |
|---|---|
| 1815 | 278 |
| 1835 | N.A. |
| 1871 | 317 |
| 1905 | 408 |
| 1939 | 343 |

| Year | Inhabitants |
|---|---|
| 1950 | 368 |
| 1961 | 341 |
| 1970 | 336 |
| 1987 | 266 |
| 2005 | 232 |

== Religion ==
As at 31 October 2013, there are 208 full-time residents in Löllbach, and of those, 170 are Evangelical (81.731%), 14 are Catholic (6.731%), 3 (1.442%) belong to other religious groups and 21 (10.096%) either have no religion or will not reveal their religious affiliation.

== Politics ==
=== Municipal council ===
The council is made up of 6 council members, who were elected by majority vote at the municipal election held on 7 June 2009, and the honorary mayor as chairman.

=== Mayor ===
Löllbach's mayor is Thomas Helfenstein.

=== Coat of arms ===
The German blazon reads: Durch Wellenschnitt schräglinks geteilt, oben in Gold ein wachsender Roter Löwe, unten in Rot ein weißes Gemerke in Form eines Schaftes mit Hinterer Oberkopfstrebe, alle mit kreisförmigen Enden.

The municipality's arms might in English heraldic language be described thus: Per bend sinister wavy, Or a demilion gules armed and langued argent, and gules a cramp bendwise sinister with crossbar, all pommetty, of the third.

Löllbach belonged throughout much of its history to the Waldgraves, albeit to several lines of that comital house. This explains the charge on the dexter (armsbearer's right, viewer's left) side, the lion. Also granting rights in Löllbach from 1392 to 1439 were the Counts of Veldenz, to the Families von Duna, Stumpf von Simmern and Boos von Waldeck. Since these were seen as nothing more than subordinates, they have not been honoured in the arms.

== Culture and sightseeing ==
=== Buildings ===
The following are listed buildings or sites in Rhineland-Palatinate’s Directory of Cultural Monuments:

- Evangelical church, Oberdorf 8 – aisleless church, essentially Late Gothic, Baroque alterations 1683, Late Gothic quire, Romanesque tower
- Auf dem Hof 2 – former school; Classicist plastered building, mid 19th century
- At Harzgasse 2 – house door, Classicist, marked 1860
- Oberdorf 2 – estate complex along the street; timber-frame house, plastered, 18th century
- Oberdorf 6 – former house (?), quarrystone building, essentially possibly late mediaeval

The village’s Evangelical church contains building remnants from the 12th or 13th century. The nave dates from about 1500. The church organ was built by the Family Stumm.

=== Clubs ===
The following clubs are active in Löllbach:

- Förderverein Gemeinde Löllbach e.V. — municipal promotional association
- Förderverein Feuerwehr Löllbach e.V. — fire brigade promotional association
- Reitverein "Perlbach" — riding club

== Economy and infrastructure ==
=== Economic structure ===
Löllbach’s economy is characterized by several small craft businesses. Some of the people commute to work in some of the nearby towns, such as Meisenheim.

=== Transport ===
Löllbach lies on Landesstraße 373 (Meisenheim–Jeckenbach–Löllbach–Kappeln–Merzweiler). There are bus links to Meisenheim and Kirn. One can board a train at Kirn on the Nahe Valley Railway (Bingen–Saarbrücken). The travel time on the hourly Regionalexpress trains to Saarbrücken is 70 minutes, while Mainz can be reached in just under an hour. Every other train to and from Frankfurt also runs through to Frankfurt Airport.
