= Henri Lichtenberger =

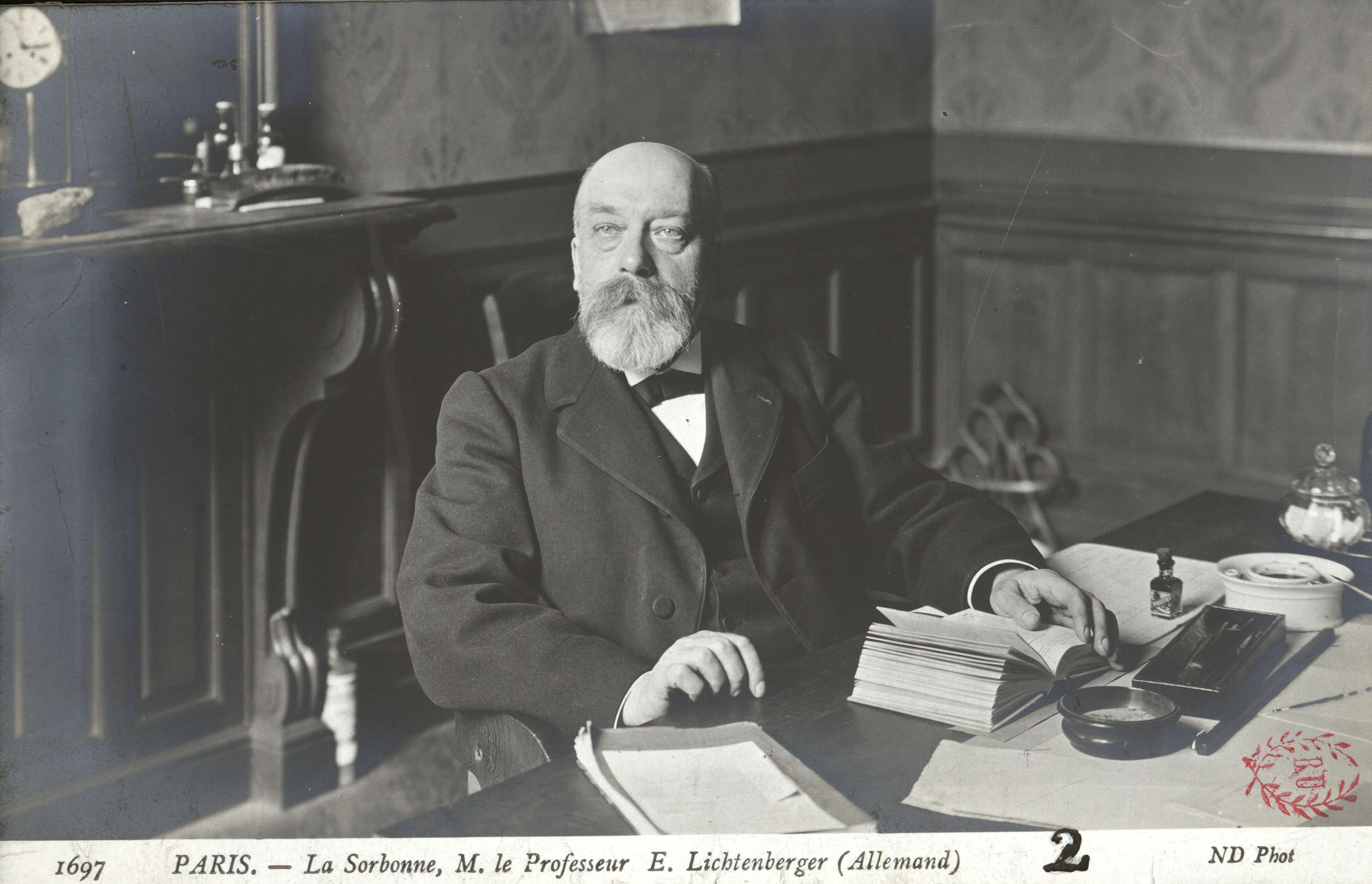
The Sorbonne. Professor Henri Lichtenberger (Bibliothèque de La Sorbonne, NuBIS)

Henri Lichtenberger (12 March 1864, Mulhouse – 4 November 1941, Biarritz) was a French academic who specialized in German literature.

== Biography ==
In 1885 he received his agrégation in German studies at Paris, and two years later, began work as a lecturer at the University of Nancy. In 1891 he became a full professor of foreign literature at Nancy, and in 1905 returned to Paris, where he served as a professor of German language and literature. In 1914-15 he was a visiting professor of comparative literature at Harvard University.

== Honors and Awards ==
Officer of the Order of Legion of Honour

== Selected works ==
- Books by Lichtenberger that have been translated into English:
  - "The gospel of superman; the philosophy of Friedrich Nietzsche", 1910; translated from the French of Henri Lichtenberger, with an introduction, by J.M. Kennedy.
  - "Germany and its evolution in modern times", 1913; translated from the French by A.M. Ludovici.
  - "Relations between France and Germany", Washington, D.C. : Carnegie Endowment for International Peace, Division of Intercourse and Education 1923.
  - "The Third Reich", 1937; translated from the French and edited by Koppel S. Pinson.
- Works by Lichtenberger with French titles:
  - Histoire de la langue allemande, 1893 – History of the German language.
  - Richard Wagner : poète et penseur, 1898 – Richard Wagner : Poet and thinker.
  - Friedrich Nietzsche : ein Abriss seines Lebens und seiner Lehre, 1899 – Friedrich Nietzsche: A summary of his life and his teachings.
  - Henri Heine penseur, 1905 – Heinrich Heine, thinker.
  - La guerre européenne et la question d'Alsace-Lorraine, 1915 (with brother André Lichtenberger) – The European war and the question regarding Alsace-Lorraine.
  - L'opinion américaine et la guerre, 1915 – The American opinion and the war.
  - L'Allemagne d'aujourd'hui dans ses relations avec la France, 1922 – The Germany of today in its relations with France.
  - Goethe, 1937-39 – Johann Wolfgang Goethe.
