= Mittelreidenbach =

- Municipality
- Coat of arms

- Location of Mittelreidenbach within Birkenfeld district
- Interactive map of Mittelreidenbach
- Location within Germany Location within Rhineland-Palatinate
- Coordinates: 49°43′33″N 07°26′28″E
- Country: Germany
- State: Rhineland-Palatinate
- District: Birkenfeld
- Municipal assoc.: Herrstein-Rhaunen

Government
  - Mayor (2019–24): Heidi Schappert

Area
  - Total: 5.07 km^{2} (1.96 sq mi)
- Elevation: 282 m (925 ft)

Population (2025-12-31)
  - Total: 742
  - Density: 146/km^{2} (379/sq mi)
- Time zone: UTC+01:00 (CET)
  - Summer (DST): UTC+02:00 (CEST)
- Postal codes: 55758
- Dialling codes: 06784
- Vehicle registration: BIR

Mittelreidenbach is an Ortsgemeinde - a member of the Verbandsgemeinde [United Municipalities of] Herrstein-Rhaunen - in the district of Birkenfeld in the state of Rhineland-Palatinate, in southwestern Germany.

== Geography ==
The village lies in the Reidenbach Valley, southeast of the Nahe River. To the west lies Idar-Oberstein.

== History ==
There is already evidence that Mittelreidenbach is an ancient settlement. The stones with markings, called "Hollen—and Bellenstein" [“Hell and Bell Stones”] in [ancient times and the eleven graves of the Huns (burial sites of the Celts) are known to be in the area of the sports fields of Mittelreidenbach.

The foundation of the present village of Mittelreidenbach goes back to the Frankish period (800-1000 AD). In the 12th century, the settlement belonged to the district of Naumburg bei Bärenbach. In this history, a Ritter (knight), Werner von Reidenbach appears, in the years between 1282 – 1287, as the resident of Hachenpfuhls (now Hachenfels) near Naumburg. In 1321, the Herren [Lords] von Reidenbach zu Dune und Stein (Oberstein, now Idar-Oberstein) were given the properties of Weiersbach and Nahbollenbach.

One of the earliest mentions of Mittelreidenbach is found in a deed of sale in 1340, when the Edelknecht (the lowest rank of medieval German nobility) Johann von Oberstein sold the tithes in Reidenbach to the Archbishop of Trier, Baldwin of Luxembourg. After the extinction of the Ritter von Reidenbach family, the properties fell to the Herren von Schwarzenberg. With the extinction of the House of Schwarzenberg in 1483, the brothers Bernhard and Jost von Flersheim in Rheinhessen inherited the village and estate of Reidenbach. Later, the Reidenbach package went as the dowry of Anna, the daughter of Jost Flersheim, to Emmerich von Dietz, the district officer of St. Wendel. When the male line of the House of Dietz became extinct in 1616, the village and estate of Reidenbach were annexed as orphaned fiefs by the Archbishopric of Trier and assigned to the district of St. Wendel. In 1779, it was transferred to the district of Oberstein.

Under the crosier of the Archbishop, Mittelreidenbach remained until Napoleon and his Grande Armée overran the Palatinate. On 23 January 1798, the village was added to the French Empire as part of the Département de la Saar, where it would stay in Birkenfeld's arrondissement [prefecture] until 1814. In 1816, the Congress of Vienna gave it to the Duchy of Saxe-Coburg-Saalfeld (after 1826, the Duchy of Saxe-Coburg and Gotha). The Duchy assigned it to the Principality of Lichtenberg, which was administrated by the town of Lichtenberg, but the Principality's distance from the Duchy proved problematic. In 1834, the Principality was sold to the Kingdom of Prussia. Mittelreidenbach became Prussian, this time in the district of St. Wendel of the Rheinprovinz [Province of the Rhineland]. With the fall of Prussia in 1918, it was added to Germany. Since the end of World War II, Mittelreidenbach has belonged to the state of Rhineland-Palatinate. Since the administrative reforms of 1970, it has been a member of the Verbandsgemeinde of Herrstein.

=== Population ===
The growth of the population of Mittelreidenbach, as shown by the numbers for the years between 1871 and 1987 from the national, state and local censuses:

Year	Residents
1815	204
1835	284
1871	328
1905	423
1939	533

Year	Residents
1950	536
1961	643
1970	699
1987	726
2005	786

== Politics ==
=== Municipal council ===
The council comprises 12 council members, elected by majority vote at the municipal election held on 7 June 2009, with the honorary mayor as the chairman.

=== Mayor ===
The mayor of Mittelreidenbach is Heidi Schappert.

=== Coat of arms ===
Mittelreidenbach's arms might be described thus: “Per pale vert a hammer and a pick per saltire surmounted by an ear of wheat couped palewise, all argent, and argent a cross gules.”

== Heritage places ==
The following historic and cultural places of Mittelreidenbach are on the Register of Heritage Places of the State of Rheinland-Palatinate (as of 14 March 2011):

- Kirchstraße: St. Christopher's Catholic Parish Church (Pfarrkirche St. Christophorus), Gothic Revival sandstone aisleless church, 1869-1872, architect Karl-Friedrich Müller, Saarlouis; décor
- Hauptstraße: at the cemetery, a Gothic Revival cross of sandstone, a crucifix of cast-iron
- Between Kirchstraße 8 and 10: Memorial of the fallen soldiers of the First World War; Christ's Cross on an elevated altar, yellow sandstone, 1926
- Kirchstraße 12: former rectory; brick building with Gothic Revival elements, an avant-corps and a figurine-niche, 1902

== Economy and infrastructure ==
For centuries, Mittelreidenbach was an agricultural community. However, industrialization and improved transportation in the late 19th century and brought rapid changes to the village. In the years after World War II, the boom of prosperity allowed Mittelreidenbach to develop the “Ringstraße” and “Auf der Acht” areas in the 1960s and 1970s, to add a sewage system as well as the water supply system in 1974 and 1975, to resurface the roads and replace the 140-year-old village bridge, and to redesign the village square. Eventually, however, because there were better jobs in the neighboring towns and cities, Mittelreidenbach turned into a residential community. Today, the only businesses in the village are two restaurants and three construction companies.

However, the changes did not keep Mittelreidenbach from winning several times since 1986 in various classes of the national competition, “Our Village is Beautiful” (German: “Unser Dorf soll schöner werden”).

=== Transportation ===
To the east runs Bundesstraße 270. A railway station on the (Bingen–Saarbrücken) Line of the Nahe Valley Railway serves nearby Fischbach

== Literature ==
- (in German) Hermann Bruhl, Beiträge und Bilder zur Geschichte von Mittelreidenbach: erweiterte Fassung eines Vortrages [Contributions and Pictures to the History of Mittelreidenbach: Expanded Version of a Lecture], Schriftenreihe der Kreisvolkshochschule Birkenfeld, Nr. 26 [Publications of the Adult Education Center of the District of Birkenfeld, No. 26], Birkenfeld, Kreisvolkshochschule, 1991
- (in German) Rudi Jung, Familienbuch der katholischen Pfarreien [Family Book of the Catholic Parishes]: Kirchenbollenbach, Fischbach-Weierbach, Mittelreidenbach, Sien, Offenbach (Glan). Bonn, Author, 1992
