= Oberreidenbach =

- Municipality
- Coat of arms

- Location of Oberreidenbach within Birkenfeld district
- Interactive map of Oberreidenbach
- Location within Germany Location within Rhineland-Palatinate
- Coordinates: 49°42′21″N 07°27′56″E
- Country: Germany
- State: Rhineland-Palatinate
- District: Birkenfeld
- Municipal assoc.: Herrstein-Rhaunen

Government
  - Mayor (2019–24): Stefan Becker

Area
  - Total: 10.93 km^{2} (4.22 sq mi)
- Elevation: 320 m (1,050 ft)

Population (2025-12-31)
  - Total: 573
  - Density: 52.4/km^{2} (136/sq mi)
- Time zone: UTC+01:00 (CET)
  - Summer (DST): UTC+02:00 (CEST)
- Postal codes: 55758
- Dialling codes: 06788
- Vehicle registration: BIR

Oberreidenbach is an Ortsgemeinde – a municipality belonging to a Verbandsgemeinde, a kind of collective municipality – in the Birkenfeld district in Rhineland-Palatinate, Germany. It belongs to the Verbandsgemeinde Herrstein-Rhaunen, whose seat is in Herrstein.

== Geography ==
=== Location ===
The municipality lies on Bundesstraße 270, in a side valley of the Upper Nahe, between the Palatinate and the Hunsrück. Oberreidenbach lies right at the edge of one of Germany's biggest military drilling grounds, the Truppenübungsplatz Baumholder, which for decades has been used mainly by the Bundeswehr and the United States Army.

The municipality has at its disposal a municipal area of 1 093 ha, of which 277 ha is wooded, and another 412 ha of which is occupied by the military drilling ground.

=== Neighbouring municipalities ===
Oberreidenbach's neighbours are Mittelreidenbach, Schmidthachenbach and Sienhachenbach. The nearest major towns are Idar-Oberstein and Kaiserslautern.

== Politics ==
=== Municipal council ===
The council is made up of 12 council members, who were elected by majority vote at the municipal election held on 7 June 2009, and the honorary mayor as chairman.

=== Mayor ===
Oberreidenbach's mayor is Stefan Becker.

=== Coat of arms ===
The municipality's arms might be described thus: Per pale gules a fess between in chief a lion's head sinister erased and in base an oakleaf slipped palewise, all argent, and countercompony azure and Or.

== Culture and sightseeing ==
=== Buildings ===
The following are listed buildings or sites in Rhineland-Palatinate’s Directory of Cultural Monuments:

- Evangelical church, Hauptstraße 60 – Gothic Revival aisleless church, sandstone-framed breccia building, 1902, architect August Senz, Cologne
- Saint Louis’s Catholic Church (Kirche St. Ludwig), Hauptstraße 82 – Late Romanesque quire tower, pointed cupola with corner turrets renovated in 1930; nave 1819-1821, architect Becker, Kirn; cast-iron grave cross, about 1895

The Evangelical church dates from 1903, and it is believed that the Catholic church dates from the mid 13th century; since 1927 it has been under monumental protection.

=== Recreation ===
The municipality has at its disposal a club hall with a stage, a bar and a sideroom. Up on the Brockelberg is a pavilion with a grilling pit and a lookout at an elevation of some 510 m above sea level. There are also many hiking trails in Oberreidenbach. There are clubs, too: football, table tennis, aerobics, the fire brigade, the Landfrauen (“Countrywomen”), the beautification club and the music club, among others.

=== Regular events ===
Oberreidenbach has its Maifest on 1 May, and a kermis on the second weekend in June.

== Economy and infrastructure ==
Oberreidenbach has two small grocer's shops, a bakery and a commercial area with a company in mechanical engineering, a nursery, a swimming pool builder and a car dealership. There are four farmers, although only one works the land full-time.

There is also a new residential development zone called Auf dem Rain with a children's playground, a sport ground and a small playing field with plastic covering.

=== Education ===
There is one primary school in Oberreidenbach, Grundschule Reidenbachtal.
