= André Lichtenberger =

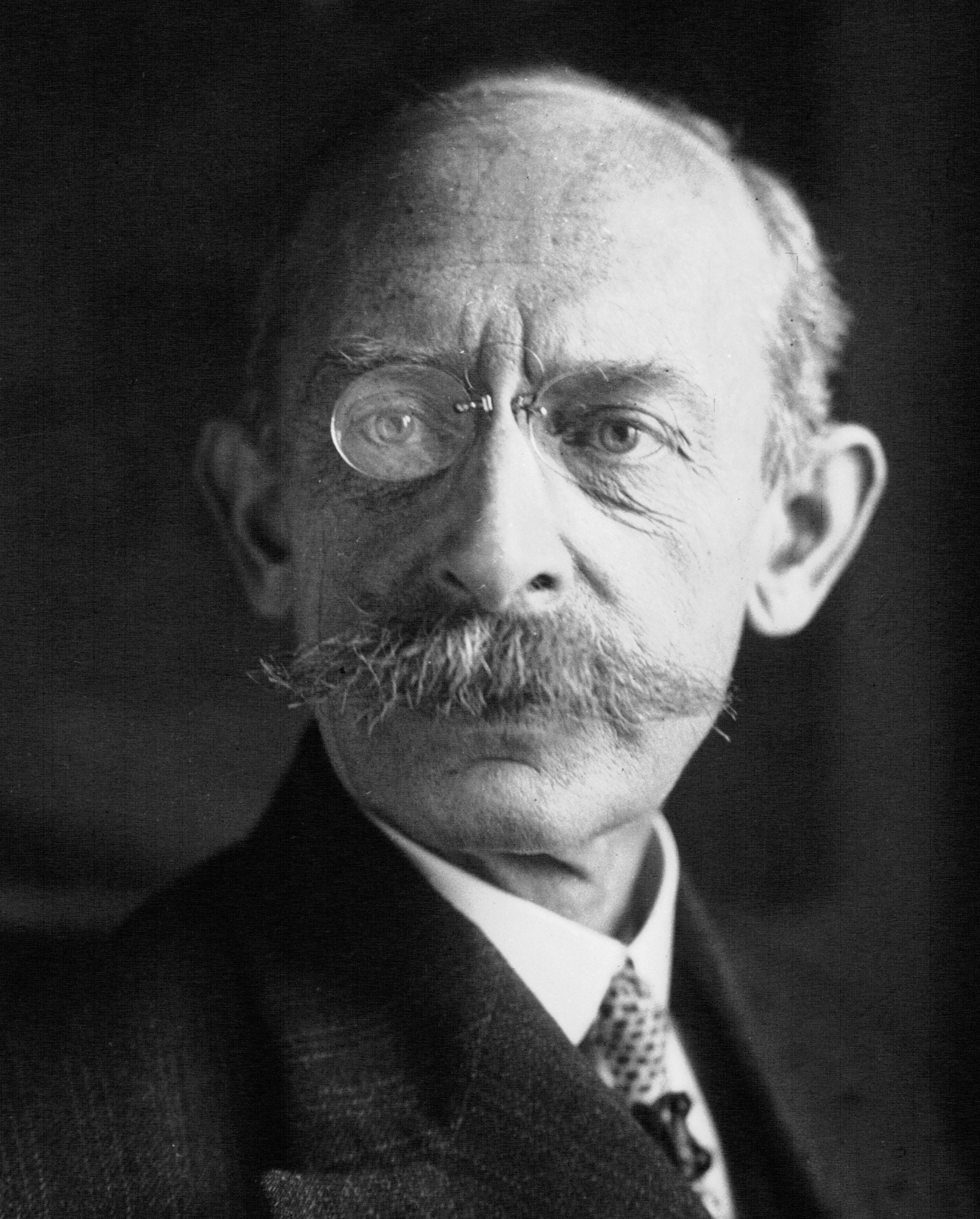

André Lichtenberger (29 November 1870, Strasbourg – 23 March 1940, Paris) was a French novelist and sociologist. He held a Doctor of Letters in history. He was the son of theologian Frédéric Auguste Lichtenberger.

== Published works ==
- Le Socialisme au XVIIIème siècle (1895), thesis
- Contes Héroïques (1897), stories from the French Revolution
- Mon Petit Trott and La Petite Soeur de Trott (1898), stories depicting the mindset of a child.
- Le Socialisme Utopique (1898)
- Le Socialisme et la Révolution française (1898)
- La Mort de Corinthe (1900), Roman archaeology
- Portraits de Jeunes Filles (1900)
- Père (1901)
- Rédemption (1902)
- Portraits d'Aïeules (1903)
- M. de Migurac ou Le Marquis Philosophe (1903)
- Les Centaures (1904), a poem written in prose.
- Line (1905)
- Gorri le Forban (1906)
- L'Automne (1907)
- Notre Minnie (1907)
- La Folle Aventure (1908)
- La Petite (1909)
- Le Petit Roi (1910)
- Tous Héros (1910)
- Juste Lobel, Alsacien (1911)
- Petite Madame (1912)
- Kaligouça le Coeur Fidèle (1913)
- Le Sang Nouveau (1914)
- Bèche (1920)
- Raramémé (1921)
- Scènes en Famille (1921)
- Le Petit Chaperon Vert (1922)

== English Translations published in the United States ==
1. The Centaurs [Les Centaures, 1904] translated by Brian Stableford, 2013, Black Coat Press, ISBN 9781612271842
2. Children of the Crab [Raramémé, 1921] translated by Brian Stableford, 2013, Black Coat Press, ISBN 9781612272009
