= Kornél Lichtenberg =

Kornél Lichtenberg (10 May 1848 – 16 February 1933) was a Hungarian aurist.

He was in Szeged; studied at Budapest and Vienna (M. D. 1873). On receiving his degree, he returned to Budapest, where he established himself at the university as docent in diseases of the ear (1883). The same year he was one of the founders of the polyclinic, of which institution he was appointed director in 1891. In recognition of his services he was decorated in 1895 with the "Ritter-Kreuz" of the Order of Francis Joseph.

Lichtenberg is the author of Az ideges süketség (Budapest, 1879), on nervous deafness; Über subjective Gehörsempfindungen (ib. 1882); and Ein Fremdkörper im Ohre mit cerebralen Erscheinungen (ib. 1883).

His son Sándor von Lichtenberg, also a doctor, went on to become one of the founding fathers of urology.
