= Großbach (Nahe) =

River in Germany

Location
- Country: Germany
- State: Rhineland-Palatinate

Physical characteristics
- Source
  - location: Confluence of the Leizenbach and Siener Bach at Otzweiler
  - coordinates: 49.7092°N 7.5110°E
- Mouth
  - location: At Kirn into the Nahe
  - coordinates: 49.7737°N 7.4516°E

Basin features
- Progression: Nahe→ Rhine→ North Sea

Großbach is a river of Rhineland-Palatinate, Germany.

The Großbach is built by the confluence of the Leizenbach and Siener Bach at Otzweiler. It is a right tributary of the Nahe at Kirn.

== See also ==
- List of rivers of Rhineland-Palatinate
