= Frederick, Count Palatine of Zweibrücken-Vohenstrauss-Parkstein =

Duke of Vohenstrauss-Parkstein

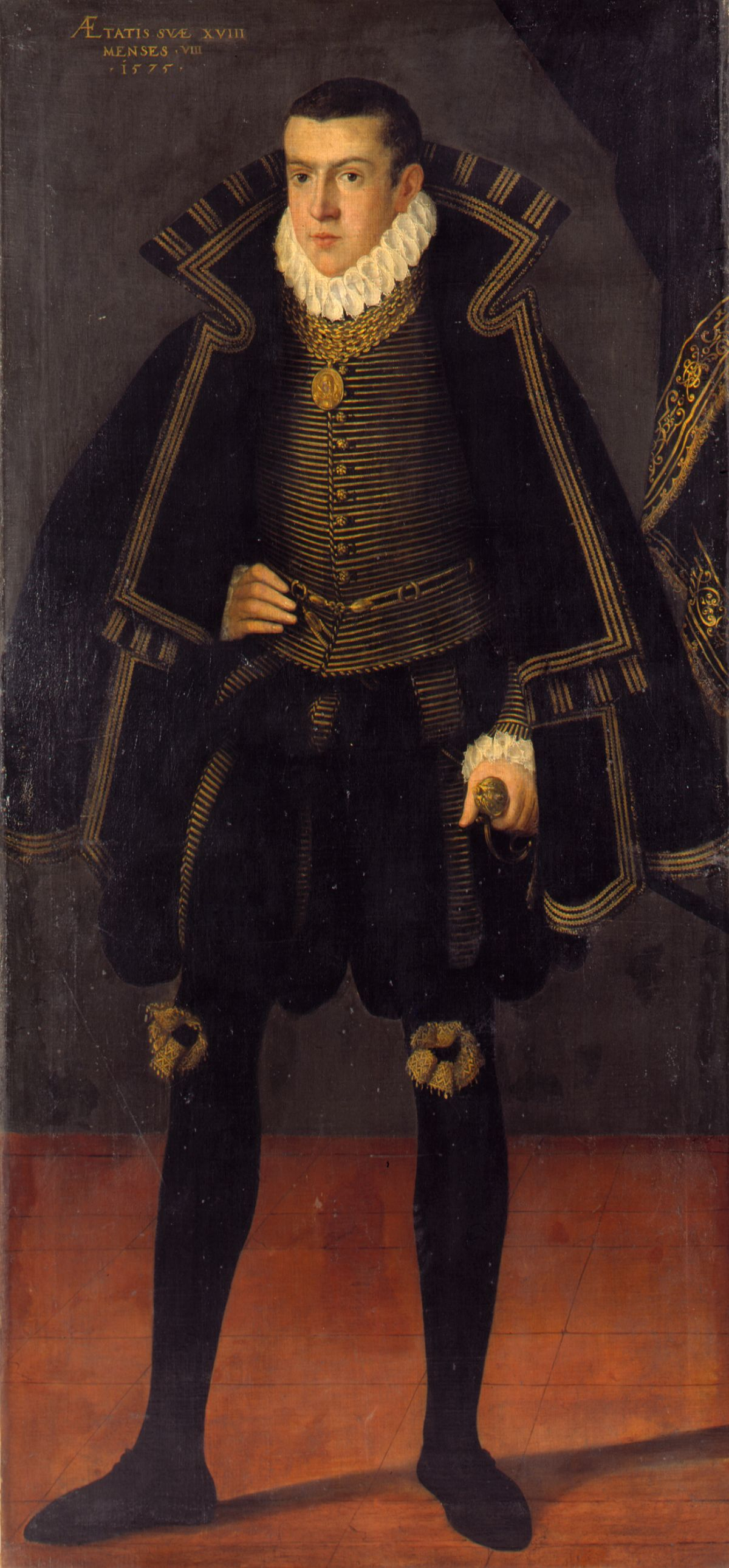
- Born: 11 April 1557; Meisenheim
- Died: 17 December 1597 (aged 40); Friedrichsburg Castle
- Buried: Lauingen
- Noble family: House of Wittelsbach
- Spouse: Katharina Sophie of Legnica
- Father: Wolfgang, Count Palatine of Zweibrücken
- Mother: Anna of Hesse

Frederick of Zweibrücken-Vohenstrauss-Parkstein (German: Friedrich) (11 April 1557 – 17 December 1597) was the Duke of Vohenstrauss-Parkstein from 1569 until 1597.

== Life ==
Frederick was born in Meisenheim in 1557 as the fourth son of Wolfgang, Count Palatine of Zweibrücken. After his father's death in 1569, and still a minor, his guardianship was assumed by his older brother Philipp Ludwig until 1581, when he was obtain his own domains: the districts of Flossenbürg, Floß and Vohenstrauss with the Parkstein-Weiden enclave.

From 1586 to 1593 he built Friedrichsburg Castle near Vohenstrauss. After he had moved in there in 1593, the small town flourished. After his death in 1597, the castle was granted to her widow as her residence. On 21 February 1598, Frederick was buried with his sons in the family crypt in St. Martin in Lauingen. Since he had no surviving descendants, his domains fell to his brother Philipp Ludwig.

== Marriage and issue ==
Frederick married on 26 February 1587 with Katharina Sophie (7 August 1561 – 10 May 1608), daughter of Duke Henry XI of Legnica. They had three children:

1. Anne Sophie (Weiden, 25 November 1588 – Amberg, 21 March 1589), buried in St. Martin Basilica, Amberg.
2. George Frederick (Weiden, 8 March 1590 – Weiden, 20 July 1590), twin with Frederick Casimir.
3. Frederick Casimir (Weiden, 8 March 1590 – Weiden, 16 July 1590), twin with George Frederick.

== Ancestors ==
Ancestors of Frederick, Count Palatine of Zweibrücken-Vohenstrauss-Parkstein

16. Louis I, Count Palatine of Zweibrücken
8. Alexander, Count Palatine of Zweibrücken
17. Johanna of Croÿ
4. Louis II, Count Palatine of Zweibrücken
18. Kraft VI, Count of Hohenlohe-Weikersheim
9. Margarete of Hohenlohe-Neuenstein
19. Helene of Württemberg
2. Wolfgang, Count Palatine of Zweibrücken
20. Louis II, Landgrave of Lower Hesse (= 24)
10. William I, Landgrave of Lower Hesse
21. Mechthild of Württemberg-Urach (= 25)
5. Elisabeth of Hesse
22. William IV, Duke of Brunswick-Lüneburg
11. Anna of Brunswick
23. Elizabeth of Stolberg-Wernigerode
1. Frederick, Count Palatine of Zweibrücken-Vohenstrauss-Parkstein
24. Louis II, Landgrave of Lower Hesse (= 20)
12. William II, Landgrave of Hesse
25. Mechthild of Württemberg-Urach (= 25)
6. Philip I, Landgrave of Hesse
26. Magnus II, Duke of Mecklenburg
13. Anna of Mecklenburg-Schwerin
27. Sophie of Pomerania-Stettin
3. Anna of Hesse
28. Albert III, Duke of Saxony
14. George, Duke of Saxony
29. Sidonie of Poděbrady
7. Christine of Saxony
30. Casimir IV Jagiellon
15. Barbara Jagiellon
31. Elisabeth of Austria

Regnal titles
Preceded by Wolfgang	Duke of Vohenstrauss-Parkstein; 1569–1597	Succeeded by Philip Louis
