= Palatinate-Zweibrücken-Vohenstrauss-Parkstein =

State of the Holy Roman Empire

Coordinates: 49°37′N 12°20′E

County Palatine of Zweibrücken-Vohenstrauss-Parkstein Pfalz-Zweibrücken-Vohenstrauß-Parkstein
- 1569–1597
- Coat of arms
- Status: State of the Holy Roman Empire
- Capital: Vohenstrauß
- Common languages: German
- Religion: Calvinism
- Government: Principality
- Count Palatine
  - 1569–1597: Frederick
- Historical era: Early Modern Age
  - Split from Palatinate-Zweibrücken: 1569
  - Ruling line extinct; fell to Palatinate-Neuburg: 1597
Preceded by	Succeeded by
County Palatine of Zweibrücken / Palatinate-Zweibrücken	Palatinate-Neuburg / County Palatine of Neuburg

Palatinate-Zweibrücken-Vohenstrauss-Parkstein was a state of the Holy Roman Empire based around Vohenstrauß and Parkstein in modern northeastern Bavaria, Germany.

Palatinate-Zweibrücken-Vohenstrauss-Parkstein was created in 1569 out of the partition of the territories of Wolfgang of Palatinate-Zweibrücken for his fourth son Frederick. Frederick died in 1597 without heirs so Vohenstrauss-Parkstein was inherited by Palatinate-Neuburg.

== Rulers ==
Duke	Reign
Frederick	1569 – 1597
