= Kirn =

- Town
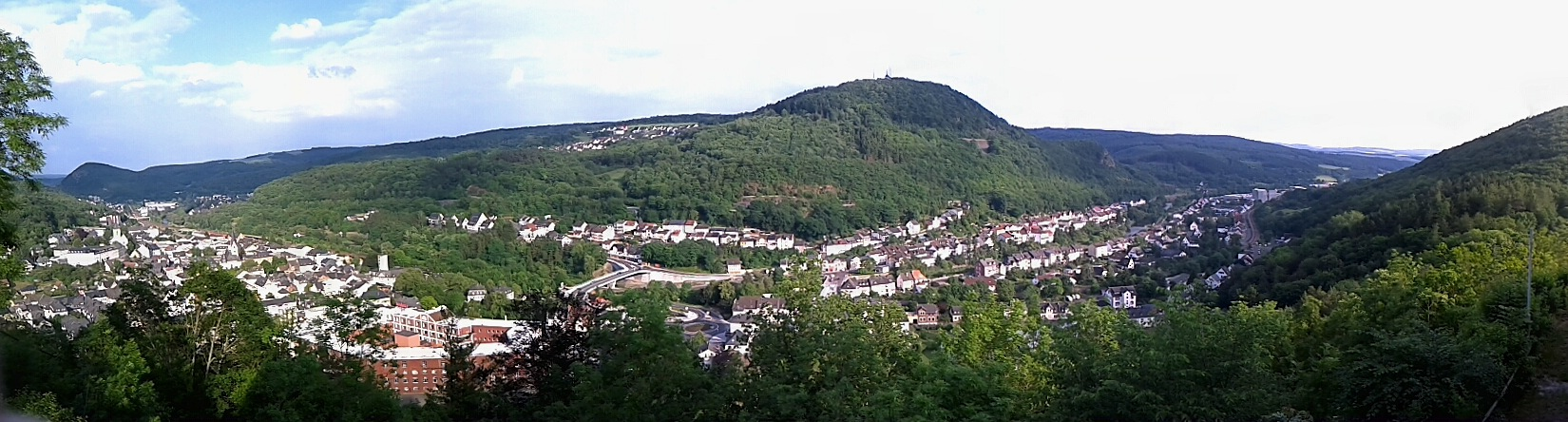
- Panorama of Kirn, seen from Kyrburg

- Coat of arms

- Location of Kirn within Bad Kreuznach district
- Interactive map of Kirn
- Location within Germany Location within Rhineland-Palatinate
- Coordinates: 49°47′17″N 7°27′26″E
- Country: Germany
- State: Rhineland-Palatinate
- District: Bad Kreuznach
- Municipal assoc.: Kirner Land

Government
  - Mayor (2020–28): Frank Ensminger (FDP)

Area
  - Total: 16.53 km^{2} (6.38 sq mi)
- Elevation: 250 m (820 ft)

Population (2025-12-31)
  - Total: 8,559
  - Density: 517.8/km^{2} (1,341/sq mi)
- Time zone: UTC+01:00 (CET)
  - Summer (DST): UTC+02:00 (CEST)
- Postal codes: 55606
- Dialling codes: 06752
- Vehicle registration: KH
- Website: www.kirn.de

Kirn (German pronunciation: [kɪʁn]) is a town in the Bad Kreuznach district in Rhineland-Palatinate, Germany. It is the seat of the Verbandsgemeinde Kirner Land. Kirn is a middle centre serving an area on the Nahe and in the Hunsrück.

== Geography ==
=== Location ===
Kirn lies in a landscape characterized by the Nahe valley and the valley of the Hahnenbach, cut deeply into the Lützelsoon, roughly 10 km northeast of Idar-Oberstein and 30 km west of Bad Kreuznach. The valley floors are heavily settled in places, whereas the steep slopes in the higher areas are mostly bare of buildings and decked with forest. Rising up above the woodland canopy in many places are freestanding quartzite crags. Particularly striking among these are the Oberhauser Felsen, the Kallenfels and the Wehlenfelsen north of the town. Flowing through the unhurried inner town is the Hahnenbach, which rises in the Hunsrück, and not too much farther downstream empties into the Nahe. Also characterizing the town's appearance is the quarry up from the town centre, which stretches eastwards all the way to the town limit.

=== Land use ===
Kirn's municipal area measures 16.53 km^{2}, and by percentages, the uses of this land break down thus:

- Agriculture — 15.1
- Woodland — 51.9
- Open water — 2.4
- Residential and transport — 28.6
- Other — 2.0

=== Neighbouring municipalities ===
Clockwise from the north, Kirn's neighbours are the municipalities of Oberhausen bei Kirn, Hochstetten-Dhaun, Meckenbach, Heimweiler and Bärenbach, the town of Idar-Oberstein and the municipalities of Fischbach, Bergen and Hahnenbach. Idar-Oberstein, Fischbach and Bergen all lie in the neighbouring Birkenfeld district, whereas all the others likewise lie within the Bad Kreuznach district.

=== Constituent communities ===
Kirn's Stadtteile are the main centre, also called Kirn, and the two outlying centres of Kallenfels and Kirn-Sulzbach. Also belonging to Kirn are the outlying homesteads of Akvas Papiermühle, Cramersmühle, Füllmannsmühle, Hasenfels, Kallenfelser Hof, Kyrburg, Ölmühle Spielmann and Schleif-Mühle.

=== Climate ===
Yearly precipitation in Kirn amounts to some 540 mm, which is rather low, falling below average for the precipitation chart for all Germany. Kirn lies alee of the surrounding uplands. The driest months are January and February. The most rainfall comes in August. Rainfall is, however, rather evenly spread across the whole year. Fog is very common for the colder season.

== History ==
The town of Kirn can look back on a very long history. It was founded at a river crossing near which several roads met. On 20 May 841, Kirn had its first documentary mention in a document from Fulda Abbey. Archaeological finds from Celtic and Roman times (the remnants of a villa rustica were unearthed in the part of town known as "Über Nahe"), however, point to a considerably greater age than that. The name Kirn is believed to be of Celtic origin. In the Fulda document mentioned above, the town was named as Chira. The name likely derives from the Celtic kyr, meaning 'water'. Meant here, of course, would be the Nahe and the Hahnenbach, which empties into it here, whose water apparently gave the town its name. The Nahe served then as an important transport route as well as supplying water for livestock and fish for people.

The first settlement is believed to have lain on the bank of the Kyrbach (another name for the Hahnenbach although, strictly speaking, it designates only the Hahnenbach's headstream some distance upstream from Kirn), in an area today bordered by Gerbergasse and Langgasse (lanes), with the marketplace in the middle. In other words, at the crossroads, a market grew up. This was the seed from which the town's history sprouted. The roads leading over the heights brought the people of the Nahegau to this market town. The Marktmeile ('market mile'), within whose tightly defined boundaries no other market was allowed to be held, protected the markets and those who fed them in a tightly bordered area around the town. Great parts of the market town were held during the High Middle Ages by Saint Maximin's Abbey in Trier, which also held the market rights.

In 926, the Abbey gave three Frankish noblemen by way of exchange a hill suitable for use as a fortification, and they proceeded to build a castle there to defend their holdings against the Magyars. It came to be known as the Kyrburg. It seems that these noblemen's castle had passed by 966 to the rising family of the Emichones/Waldgraves. In the time that followed, these new owners bit by bit did the Abbey out of its rights, leaving it only with the market rights. In the 11th or 12th century, the rights to the market were transferred to the Lords of Stein, whose seat was on the "stones" (Stein means 'stone' in German) in the Hahnenbach valley above what is now Kirn's outlying centre of Kallenfels. The Lords of Stein-Kallenfels were able to assert these rights until the 18th century, defending them first against the Waldgraves and later against their successors.

West of the market centre arose another settlement in the years that followed, obviously founded by the Waldgraves, which was called Altstadt ('Old Town'), and for which town rights were being sought, as it were, to take the bread out of the market town's mouth. Town rights, though, were forthcoming to neither the Kyr settlement nor the Altstadt, even though the settlement on the Hahnenbach, beginning in 1335, was time and again in documents being called Stadt ('town'). Both the market centre and the Old Town were at least partly fortified. The names of the gates that stood at the ends of the thoroughfares (Kellenpforte, Karschpforte, Nahepforte, Schülerpforte, Kieselpforte) are known. The last town gate was torn down in 1880 in the Old Town to make way for growing traffic. The Kyrbach's left bank was also built up. Standing here was the church, which if anything was part of an old royal estate. As a landhold of the Archbishopric of Mainz it became an outlying centre of a great rural chapter that comprised the rural clergy all the way over to the Simmern area.

Even after various divisions of inheritance, Kirn remained between 1258 and 1790 a joint holding of the Houses of Dhaun and Kyrburg. Despite its economic and ecclesiastical importance, Kirn had at its disposal since earliest times only a small municipal area, which even today has not changed. The vineyards strewn over the hills all about the town surely only provided for local demand. The scant, stony soils allowed no more than limited yields when farmed. Livestock raising, on the other hand, seems to have played a certain role. These circumstances favoured the growth of various handicrafts in the town.

Livestock raising, the low-lying oak forest right nearby and the water from the Nahe and the Kyr consequently led to the establishment of tanning and wool processing. Reports of a woollen weavers' guild crop up as early as 1359. The tanners' and tailors' guilds seem to have arisen about this time, too. The tanners, and the dyers, too, settled along the flat bank of the Hahnenbach. The later tanners' quarter between Gerbergasse and the Nahe only arose in modern times. Their products were marketed by both local people and those from farther afield, mainly at the four great yearly markets and the weekly markets. The houses around the marketplace had on their ground floors recesses in which local handicraftsmen would offer their wares for sale in their “shops”.

On the marketplace itself were, besides the two fountains, also lockable market stalls that could be hired by bakers, butchers and potters. On the Hahnenbach side of the square stood the 1508 town hall, which was torn down in 1849 to make way for what was even then a growing amount of traffic. The prison there once held the thirteen-year-old Johannes Bückler – better known as Schinderhannes – in 1796, but not for very long, for he quickly escaped. The townsfolk's self-assurance in those days showed itself in the establishment of civic institutions such as a bathing parlour and an infirmary. The great many donations to the Church bear witness to the people's wealth.

Around the church over on the Kyr's left bank stood clerics' houses as well as the Latin school, which was first mentioned in 1402, and which in the course of its history sent dozens of students to every university in Germany. Because the local lordships were somewhat less than decisive in their governance, the Reformation was introduced into the Waldgravial-Rhinegravial lands only in 1544 or 1545. Outwardly, the Kirn townsfolk's new self-assurance showed itself in the way they ended their own serfdom in 1600 by buying their freedom for 4,000 Rhenish guilders. It was many years, though, before the debt burden arising from this no longer weighed on the town's economy.

Kirn's and its economy's favourable growth came to a dead stop with the Thirty Years' War. Foreign fighters (Spaniards, Croats, Frenchmen and Swedes, to name but a few) along with two Plague epidemics wrought havoc with the town, reducing its 230 families in 1616 (two years before the war broke out) to only 74 afterwards. These losses were somewhat offset by the arrival of newcomers from Lombardy, the Tyrol and the Engadin. These immigrants and their offspring quickly became a force not only in the town's economy but also in its cultural life. From the Family Englisch, who had come from the Davos area, sprang the painter Johann Georg Englisch (1668-1741), who did paintings in many churches over a broad area, and Johann Bernhard Englisch (1709-1768), who as a much sought-after ébéniste plied his trade as far away as Lake Geneva.

The latter half of the 17th century, though, brought Kirn many occupations in connection with French King Louis XIV's wars of conquest. The town sometimes had to put up with (and supply) years-long occupations. This period ended with the Kyrburg's destruction in 1734, an event that the townsfolk surely also welcomed. After the House of Salm died out, the lordship over the Oberamt of Kirn and the half share of the town itself passed in 1743 to the line of Salm-Leuze. Together with his brother Phillip Joseph, Prince Johann Dominik Albert took over the lordship.

Johann Dominik (1708-1778) was an enlightened, affable prince, who through future-oriented measures, such as building streets and boulevards, boosted the economy. Many of his master builder Thomas Petri's buildings still characterize Kirn's appearance, and the same is true for a number of the outlying villages that then belonged to the Oberamt. Particularly worthy of mention here are the winery on Kallenfelser Straße, the Piarist monastery (nowadays the town hall) and many official and private buildings throughout the town. Meanwhile, in 1767, Kirn received a town charter. Johann Dominik's nephew and successor Friedrich III ruined the country's finances with his impecunious ways of conducting his life, to the point at which the Reichskammergericht even imposed a bankruptcy régime on the town. In 1794, he met his end in Paris at the guillotine.

Beginning in 1797, the little state that was Kirn belonged, like all the German lands on the Rhine's left bank, to the French state. It formed together with a few outlying villages a mairie ('mayoralty') in the Arrondissement of Simmern in the Department of Rhin-et-Moselle. Kirn now became a town lying in the southwesternmost part of its department, thus cleaving it asunder from many of the formerly Salm-held areas that had once fed its economy. When the decisions made at the Congress of Vienna in 1814 and 1815 began to be implemented locally in 1817, things got even worse for Kirn as it was assigned to the Kreuznach district. To the west the town now bordered on the Birkenfeld district in the Grand Duchy of Oldenburg and to the south on the Meisenheim district in the Landgraviate of Hesse-Homburg. Thus, just beyond the last houses in town began foreign territory. The economic downfall arising from this situation could not be stopped.

Together with seven villages, Kirn now formed the Bürgermeisterei ('Mayoralty') of Kirn, an arrangement that lasted until 1857 when, by Royal Cabinet Order, Kirn was granted the rank of town. Now, however, there was only one leader, the mayor, who held the reins of both the town and the now supposedly separate outlying villages. This "personal union" lasted until 1896.

Only after the fall of the customs barriers and the building of the Rhine-Nahe Railway (1856-1859) was there once again an appreciable economic upswing. Leathermaking began to recover once the tanners, both those using bark tanning and those using mineral tanning, set up shop – sometimes jointly – in the area between the Nahe, the Hahnenbach and the millpond, after traditionally keeping their tanneries along the bank of the Hahnenbach.

After 1850, a few tanning families moved on and rose with new businesses in new locations, sometimes to worldwide importance. After the Rhine-Nahe Railway had been completed, not only leather products could be shipped to market, but so could the melaphyre being quarried at Kirn's quarries. With the rise of the brewery near the winery in 1863, the town eventually earned itself the title "Town of Leather, Stones and Beer". As industry grew, so too did the demand for manpower, and thus between 1850 and 1910, the town's population swelled from roughly 1,500 to 7,000.

This positive development was, however, interrupted by the upshot from the First World War, the runaway inflation and the Great Depression. Already in the 1920s and 1930s, many enterprises felt forced to restructure their production. New businesses came that contributed once again to a rise in Kirn's economic importance, and in the field of finishing small leather goods, to a rise in the town's prestige.

After the Second World War, there was another economic upswing, which brought along with it more population growth. Beginning in the 1960s, it was clear that another restructuring was needed. Since that time, no more tanning has been done in Kirn and even the small leather goods industry found itself undergoing changes. Instead of leather, plastic goods are now produced. With the amalgamation of the villages of Kallenfels and Kirnsulzbach in 1969, the population rose for a time above 10,000, only to shrink later on. Today, somewhat more than 8,000 people call Kirn home.

=== Jewish history ===
Kirn had a Jewish community until sometime between 1938 and 1942. Even as far back as the Middle Ages, there were Jews living in the town. The violent persecution that took place on 21 September 1287 (11 Tishri 5048 according to data in Siegmund Salfeld's Das Martyrologium des Nürnberger Memorbuches) saw the murder of six Jews in Kirn. This is believed, for it did after all happen in the same year, to have been linked to the wave of pogroms that swept the region as a result of the Oberwesel blood libel (see Werner of Oberwesel). The survivors moved away from Kirn. In the earlier half of the 14th century, however, there were once again Jews living in the town. The Waldgrave of Kyrburg, then the town's lord, took ownership of three Jews, after having secured leave from King Albrecht to do so in 1301. In 1330, Waldgrave Johann asked for the number of Jews (or Jewish families) to be raised to 15, which was likewise approved by the Emperor. Jewish life in the town was, however, destroyed in the antisemitic persecution that arose in the time of the Plague (1348-1349). It is believed that Kirn's Jewish families saw to their own institutions, such as a prayer room and a graveyard: from the 16th century to the 19th, there was still a cadastral area within the town named Of dem Judenkirchof ('On the Jews' Churchyard') in memory of an old Jewish graveyard. Between the 15th and 18th centuries, there were apparently no Jewish residents at all in Kirn. Only in 1693, during one of French King Louis XIV's occupations, is a Jewish inhabitant mentioned as being in town for a short while. From the mid 19th century, there were once again Jewish families living in Kirn. The number of Jewish inhabitants developed as follows: in 1843, there were none; in 1858, 5; in 1866, 45; in 1895, 104 (1.8% of all together 5,639 inhabitants). The Jews who had moved to town were by and large from smaller outlying places in the region, among others Hennweiler, Bruschied, Becherbach, Simmern unter Dhaun (today Simmertal), Merxheim, Meddersheim, Sien, Laufersweiler and Hottenbach. After 1900, the Jews living in Becherbach became part of the Kirn Jewish community, having hitherto belonged to the Hundsbach community. The actual entity known as the Jewish community (the Israelitische Religionsgesellschaft in Kirn) was founded in 1866 when a leadership and representatives were elected and at the same time both a men's association and a women's association came into being. Appearing on the 1866 list of "Jews who have been empowered to exercise the franchise" were Jacob Ullmann (salesman), David Ullmann (merchant), David Wolf (spice dealer from Löllbach), Moses Lieb (salesman) Abraham Scholem (merchant), Marcus Loeb (merchant from Weierbach) and Jacob Mayer (musician, innkeeper from Hennweiler). In the way of institutions, there were a synagogue (see Synagogue below), a Jewish school, a mikveh and a graveyard (see Jewish graveyard below). To provide for the community's religious needs, a schoolteacher was hired, who also busied himself as the hazzan and the shochet (preserved is a whole series of job advertisements for such a position in Kirn from such publications as Der Israelit). Among the religion teachers were Joseph Seligmann (about 1880), Max Goldschmidt (about 1892; born in 1871 in Schlüchtern; died at Theresienstadt concentration camp in 1943), Joseph Nathan Kahn (in 1898–1899; born in 1877 in Rieneck; had been a teacher in Babenhausen, after his short time in Kirn he moved to Offenbach am Main), Bernhard Weil (beginning in 1908; born in 1868 in Eichstetten, died in 1943 in Noé, Haute-Garonne, France, was until February 1939 in Kirn, thereafter and until his deportation in October 1940 in Karlsruhe; further details can be found at the end of this section). One member of Kirn's Jewish community fell in the First World War, Alfred Moritz (b. 16 May 1890 in Meisenheim, d. 20 June 1916). In 1925, Kirn's Jewish community numbered 106 (1.4% of the total population). In 1932, the Jewish community's leaders were Ferdinand Schmelzer (head of leadership), since 1911 the owner of a shop that sold brushes and household goods at Radergasse 1, Dr. med. Richard Asch (second leader), who since 1918 had had a medical practice at Bahnhofstraße 11, was a doctor for the Deutsche Reichsbahn, and was said to be called the "poor man's doctor" for his charitable engagement, and Wilhelm Vogel I (third leader), a merchant who lived at Neuestraße 9. Still working as teacher, cantor and shochet was the same Bernhard Weil already named. In the 1931–1932 school year, he taught 12 Jewish children from the community in religion. After 1933, the year when Adolf Hitler and the Nazis seized power, though, some of the Jews (that year, almost 100 persons) moved away or even emigrated in the face of the boycotting of their businesses, the progressive stripping of their rights and repression, all brought about by the Nazis. On Kristallnacht (9–10 November 1938), the synagogue's interior was utterly destroyed by Brownshirt thugs, and perhaps worse, 13 Jewish homes were also invaded and demolished. Nevertheless, there were still 39 Jewish inhabitants in Kirn in 1939. The last eleven Jewish inhabitants were deported to the camps in July 1942. According to the Gedenkbuch – Opfer der Verfolgung der Juden unter der nationalsozialistischen Gewaltherrschaft in Deutschland 1933-1945 ("Memorial Book – Victims of the Persecution of the Jews under National Socialist Tyranny") and Yad Vashem, of all Jews who either were born in Kirn or lived there for a long time, 50 were victims of Nazi persecution (birthdates in brackets):

1. Johanna Allmeyer née Köhler (1880)
2. Julius Allmeyer (1884)
3. Erwin Baum (1918)
4. Johanna Baum née Liebmann (1878)
5. Siegmund Baum (1883)
6. Julius Berg (1899)
7. Martha Blasius née Koppenhagen (1892)
8. Otto Brück (1873)
9. Otto Dornhard (1886)
10. Else Dornhard (1914)
11. Ernst Dornhard (1917)
12. Selma Dornhard née Hanau (1891)
13. Johanna Gottschalk née Fried (1881)
14. Maurice Gottschalk (1896)
15. Max Gottschalk (1878)
16. Moritz Gottschalk (1893)
17. Paul Gottfried Gottschalk (1909)
18. Theo Gottschalk (1915)
19. Julius Grebe (1881)
20. Hertha Greve née Weingarten (1897)
21. Erich Haas (1914)
22. Helene Haas née Gudenberg (1879)
23. Leo Haas (1878)
24. Willy (Wilhelm) Haas (1888)
25. Felix Joseph (1905)
26. Gustav Joseph (1866)
27. Rosa (Rosina) Joseph née Scholem (1867)
28. Anni Kahn (1921)
29. Amalie Leib (1872)
30. Elise Leib née Sender (1874)
31. Leopold Leib (1875)
32. Erna Levy née Vogel (1899)
33. Max Ernst Levy (1908)
34. Berta Levy née Kaufmann (1870)
35. Leopold Levy (1895)
36. Loritz Levy (1909)
37. Erna Lob (1919)
38. Frieda Paula Moritz (1890)
39. Jette (Henriette) Moritz née Rosenfeld (1859)
40. Henriette Römer née Sender (1902)
41. Siegfried Römer (1924)
42. Bertha Rothschild née Bärmann (1856)
43. Albert Schmelzer (1903)
44. Fritz Sigismund Schmelzer (1904)
45. Herbert Sternheimer (1898)
46. Rosa Vogel née Michel (1879)
47. Wilhelm Vogel I (1872)
48. Bernhard Weil (1868) (see also below)
49. Otto Weil (1894)
50. Else Weiss née Dornhard (1914)

Bernhard Weil, third from the bottom in the list and also mentioned earlier, was born on 19 June 1868 in Eichstetten to Isaak Weil and Pauline née Rotschild. He had himself trained as a schoolteacher and a cantor and worked as such from 1908 to 1939 in Kirn (and before that in Leutershausen [Bergstraße], among other places).

== Religion ==
As at 30 September 2013, there are 8,220 full-time residents in Kirn, and of those, 4,180 are Evangelical (50.852%), 2,152 are Catholic (26.18%), 2 are Greek Orthodox (0.024%), 2 are Jehovah's Witnesses (0.024%), 1 is Lutheran (0.012%), 1 is Old Catholic (0.012%), 2 belong to the Palatinate State Free Religious Community (0.024%), 1 is Reformed (0.012%), 1 is Old-Reformed (0.012%), 7 are Russian Orthodox (0.085%), 1 belongs to the Frankfurt Jewish worship community (0.012%), 481 (5.852%) belong to other religious groups and 1,389 (16.898%) either have no religion or will not reveal their religious affiliation.

== Politics ==
=== Town council ===
The council is made up of 24 council members, who were elected by personalized proportional representation at the municipal election held on 7 June 2009, and the mayor as chairman. The municipal election held on 7 June 2009 yielded the following results:

Party	Share (%)	+/–	Seats	+/–
SPD	47.2	+2.3	11	=
CDU	24.3	–11.0	6	–3
FDP	23.0	+13.2	6	+4
FWG	5.5	–4.5	1	–1

Gains and losses (“+/–”) are reckoned against the 2004 election results. Voter turnout was 48.5% (48.3% in 2004).

=== Mayor ===
Kirn's mayor is Frank Ensminger (FDP), and his deputies are Christa Hermes (CDU), Michael Kloos (SPD), and Hartmut Ott (FWG).

=== Coat of arms ===
The town's arms might be described thus: Gules two lions combatant Or armed and langued azure holding two cramps per saltire argent, crowning the shield a mural coronet with three towers embattled of the second.

=== Town partnerships ===
Kirn fosters partnerships with the following places:

- Fontaine-lès-Dijon, Côte-d'Or (Burgundy), France since 10 May 1986

Since the partnership documents were signed, there have been regular exchanges between Kirn and the commune of Fontaine-lès-Dijon (which lies just outside Dijon and about 500 km from Kirn) of families, groups and officials. The official yearly meeting takes place at Whitsun, with the venue alternating between the two towns each year, and this is attended by up to 250 citizens.

- Marange-Silvange, Moselle (Lorraine), France since 7 November 2010

The commune of Marange-Silvange lies 12 km northwest of Metz. The partnership’s goal is mainly to bring youth from both places together. Since the signing of the agreement, there have already been contacts and meetings.

== Culture and sightseeing ==
=== Buildings ===
The following are listed buildings or sites in Rhineland-Palatinate’s Directory of Cultural Monuments:

==== Kirn (main centre) ====
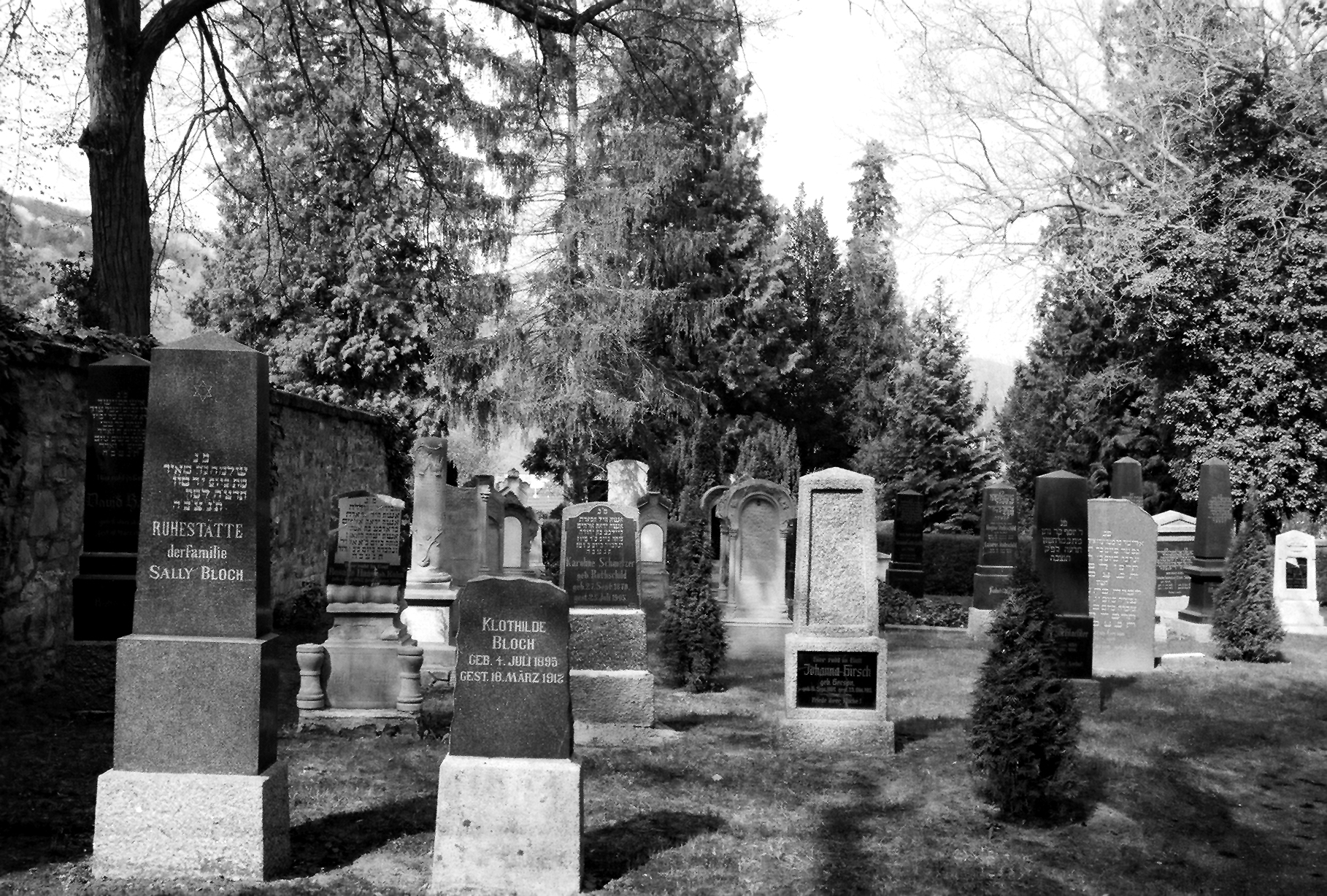
Jewish graveyard (monumental zone)

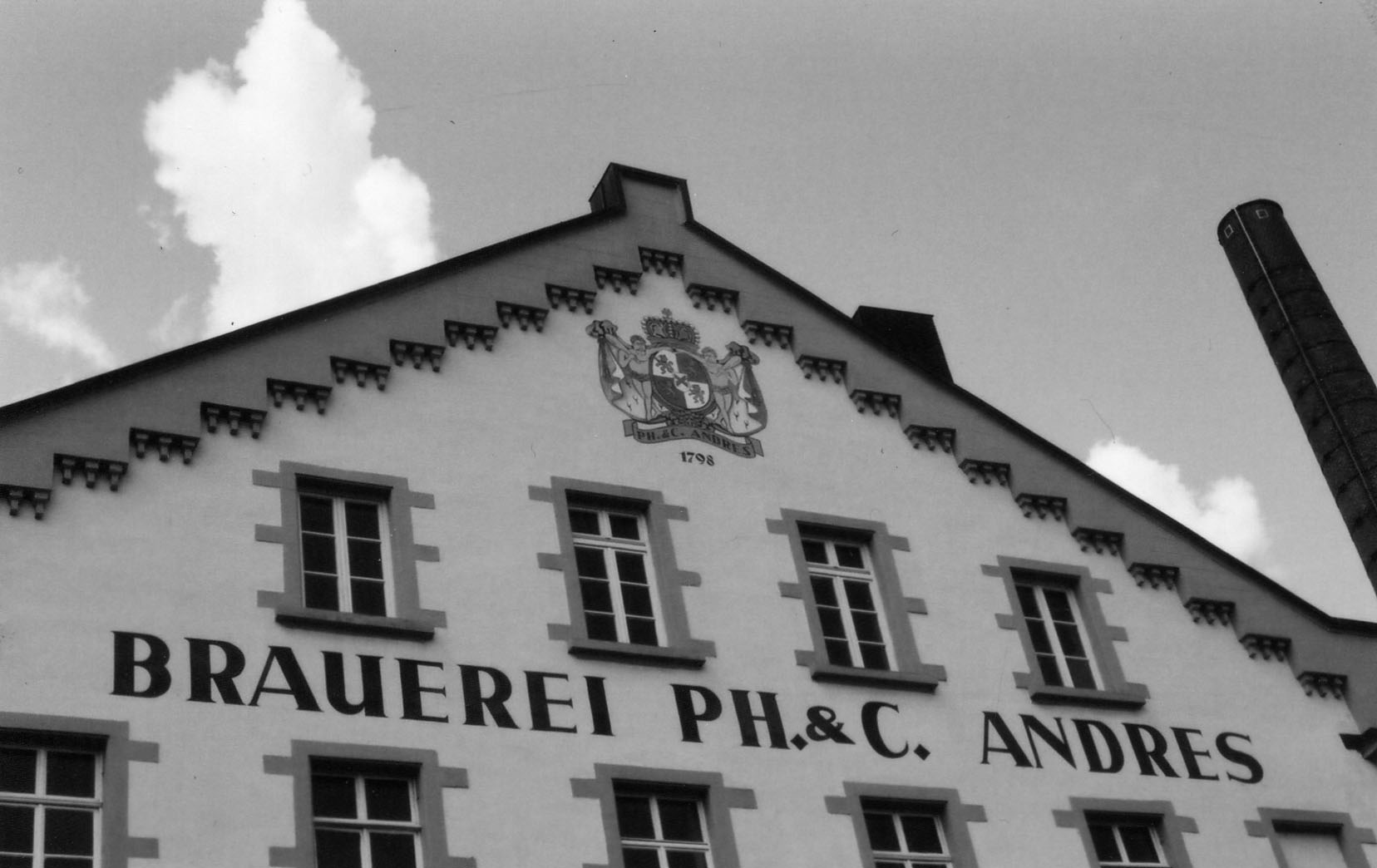
Kallenfelser Straße (no number) – Andres brewery

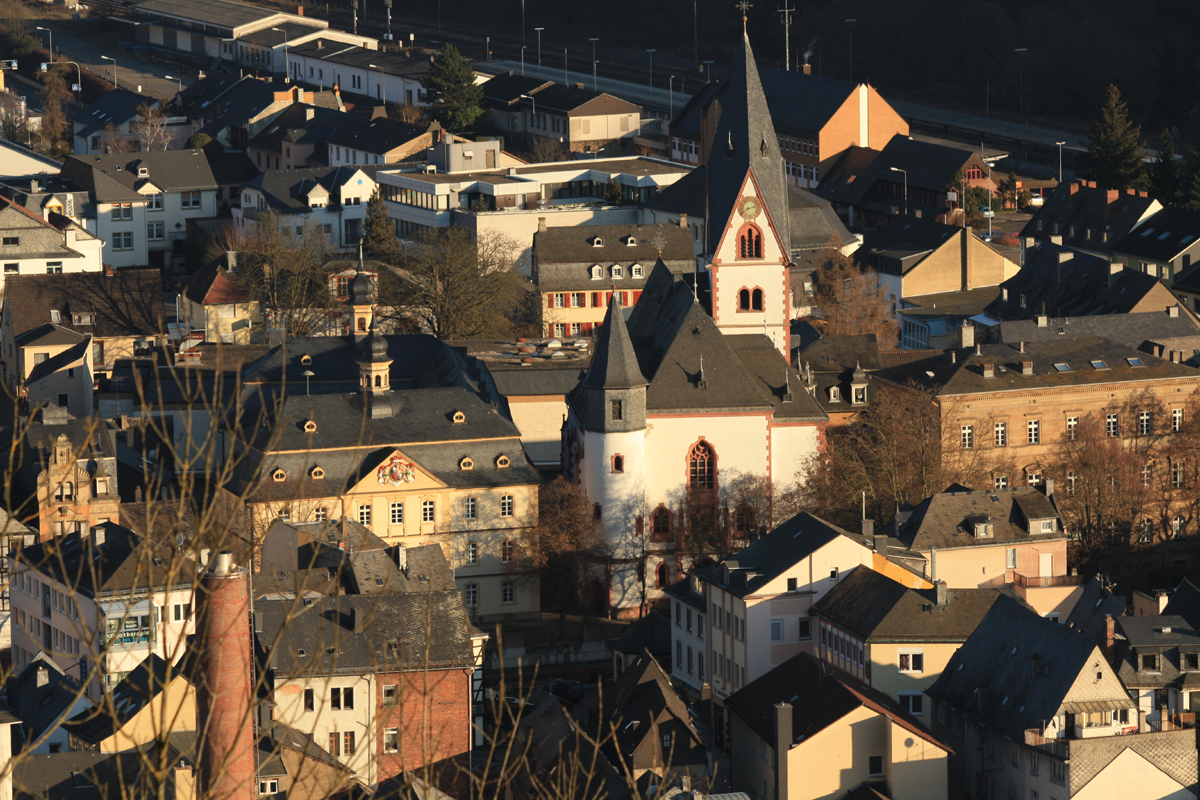
Kirchstraße 3 and 4 – former Piarist monastery (town hall) and Evangelical church

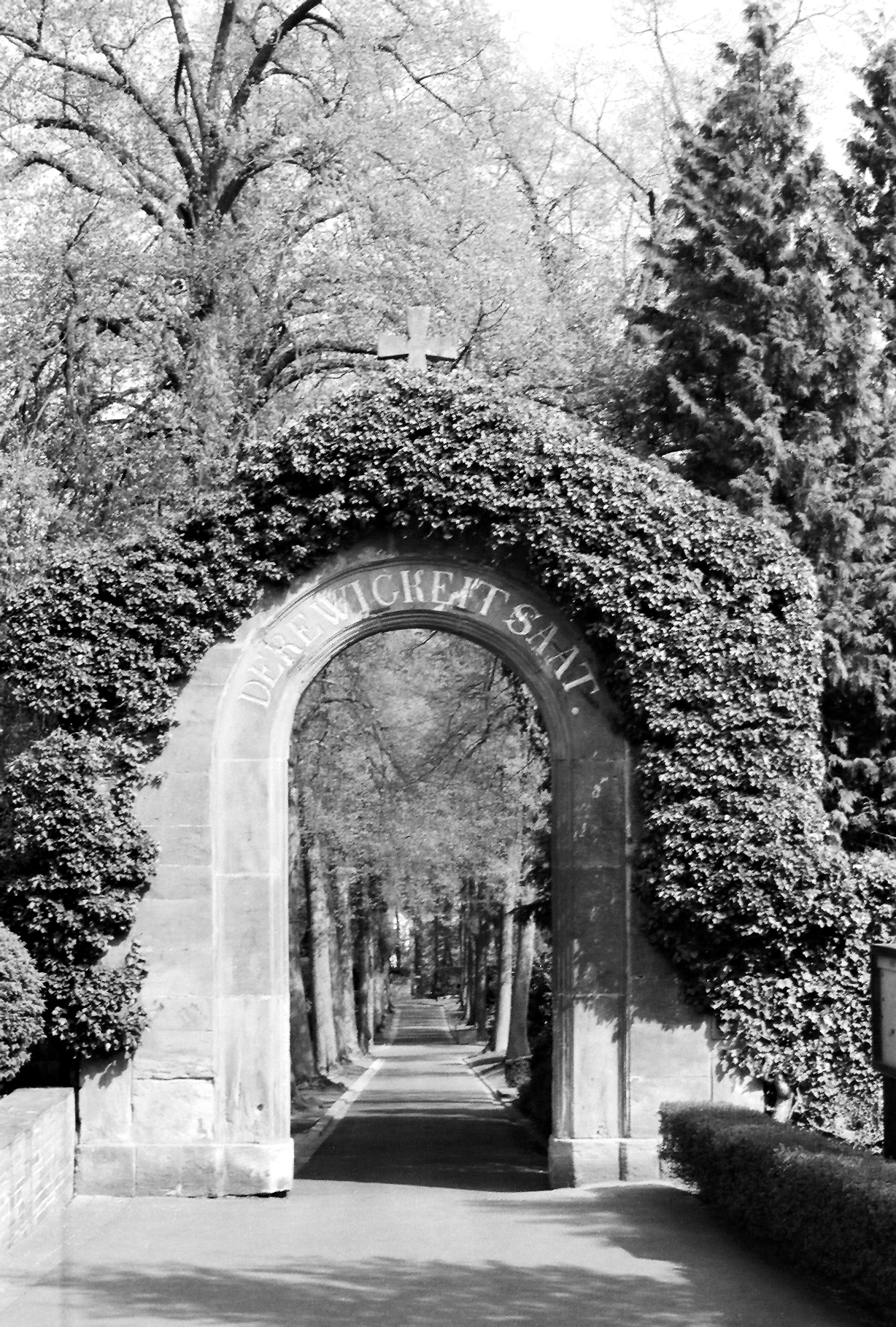
Auf der Schanze – graveyard; graveyard gate

- Evangelical church, Kirchstraße 4 – former Saint Pancras's Collegiate Church (Stiftskirche St. Pankratius), Late Gothic Revival hall church, 1891–1893, architect Wiethase; Late Gothic quire, after 1467; six-floor tower, fifth floor inserted in between in 1893, mid 13th century; Late Gothic vestry (see also below)
- Saint Pancras's Catholic Parish Church (Pfarrkirche St. Pankratius), Kolpingweg 1 – Late Gothic Revival basilica, 1892–1894, architect Max Meckel, Limburg
- Alter Oberhauser Weg 8 – house, Baroquified building with hipped mansard roof, 1937, architect Friedrich Otto, Kirn
- Altstadt 1 – former manufacturer's villa for member of the Family Simon; Late Historicist representative building, last fourth of the 19th century, setting important to town building layout
- Auf der Schanze, at the graveyard – graveyard gate, sandstone, mid 19th century; grave crosses, cast-iron, after 1871; Peter and Gerhardt tomb, Baroquified columbarium-like Rundbogen niche, about 1900; Böcking tomb, grave cross, cast-iron, about 1862; Andres grave: complex with nine gravestones in wrought-iron enclosure, 19th and 20th centuries; mass grave, with Angel of Death, about 1875; Nonnweiler grave: small Gründerzeit complex with display wall, about 1880/1890; Häfner and Stroh grave: Late Classicist grave columns, about 1882 and 1885; Theodor Simon grave: about 1878 to 1920, antique sandstone aedicula, about 1880/1900; two granite obelisks, about 1878; Sorrowful Mother, about 1920; Child, about 1902
- Auf der Schanze, Jewish graveyard (monumental zone) – about 1870 to 1939, area with many tombs (see also below)
- Bahnhofstraße 21 – Gründerzeit clinker brick building, Gothic Revival motifs, about 1900
- Bahnhofstraße 23 – three-floor Late Classicist house, latter half of the 19th century
- Bahnhofstraße 27 – villalike Late Classicist house, mid 19th century
- Bahnhofstraße 31 – former Böcking leather factory, long three-floor quarrystone building, two- to three-floor factory building, about 1860 to 1880, expansion into the 20th century
- Bahnhofstraße 35 – Late Gründerzeit villa with hip roof, about 1900
- Bürgermeister-Tschepke-Straße 18–66 (even numbers) (monumental zone) – housing estate for workers at the Jakob Müller leatherware factory, 1950s; 13 semi-detached bungalows with front gardens, Heimatstil
- Dhauner Straße – so-called Weiße Brücke (“White Bridge”); concrete-trough bridge, 1905
- Dominikstraße 41 – Dominikschule (school); three-floor plastered building, Renaissance Revival, gymnasium, toilet facility, 1903–1905
- Fasanenweg – water cistern; sandstone, about 1900/1910
- Gerbergasse 1 – five-floor shophouse, Bauhaus architecture, 1931, architect Otto Deyhle
- Gerbergasse 4 – three-floor shophouse, building with mansard roof, clinker brick, about 1890/1900
- Gerbergasse 12 – three-floor timber-frame shophouse, partly slated, essentially Baroque, possibly from the 18th century, corner setting important to town building layout
- Gerbergasse 13 – former tanning house; partly timber-frame, roof with penthouse-roof aeration zone, latter half of the 19th century
- Halmer Weg 10 – Late Gründerzeit villa, partly timber-frame, Art Nouveau motifs, about 1905
- Halmer Weg 14 – villa; two- to three-floor building with knee wall, partly timber-frame, about 1900/1905
- Halmer Weg 27 – school; two- to three-floor three-wing building, stairway and gymnasium, mixed forms, Heimatschutzarchitektur/1950s, about 1953/54, architect possibly Julius Schneider, Idar-Oberstein or Friedrich Otto, Kirn
- Im Hohen Rech 8 – house, about 1900
- Jahnstraße 11 – hospital; two- to three-floor Neoclassical building with mansard roof, about 1910
- Kallenfelser Straße (no number) – Andres brewery; stately three-floor Late Classicist main building, long works building, quarrystone, further older works buildings
- Kallenfelser Straße 1 – former princely winery; two-and-a-half-floor three-wing complex, mansard roof, 1769–1771, architect Johann Thomas Petri (see also below)
- Kallenfelser Straße 2 – Villa Andres; Late Historicist plastered building with mezzanine, about 1890/1900
- Kasinoweg 3 – Baroque Revival building with mansard roof, partly slated timber framing, 1930, architect Otto, Kirn
- Kasinoweg 5 – former casino; Late Classicist villa, 1876
- Kirchstraße 3 – former Piarist monastery (town hall); three-floor Late Baroque three-wing complex, 1765–1769, architect Johann Thomas Petri; former rectory and schoolhouse, 1753, floor added in 1768 (see also below)
- Kolpingweg 1 – Catholic rectory, Gothic Revival plastered building, about 1900
- Linke Hahnenbachstraße 10 – house; Gründerzeit sandstone-block building with knee wall, late 19th century
- Linke Hahnenbachstraße 11 – “An der Bach” inn; partly timber-frame, late 16th or early 17th century, in alteration 19th century
- Marktplatz – fountain figure, Saint George; bronze, about 1910, sculptor Hugo Cauer, Bad Kreuznach
- Marktplatz 4 – “Haus Kölsch”; Baroque house-inn; three-floor timber-frame building, half-hip roof, 17th century
- Marktplatz 7 – former summer house; eight-sided Rococo pavilion, 1776, architect Johann Thomas Petri
- Marktplatz 4, 5, 6, 7, (8), 9 (monumental zone) – two- to three-floor shophouses, partly timber-frame, from the 16th to 19th centuries, form the marketplace's west side
- Nahegasse 2 – shophouse; three-floor Late Gothic building with half-hip roof, partly timber-frame, possibly from the 16th century, altered in the 18th or 19th century
- Nahegasse 5 – three-floor shophouse; Baroque timber-frame building, slated, marked 1666
- Nahegasse 9 – three-floor shophouse; Baroque timber-frame building, slated, 17th century
- Nahegasse 11 – three-floor shophouse; Baroque timber-frame building, slated, essentially from the 17th century (?)
- Neue Straße 13 – Evangelical parish hall; building with hip roof with gable risalto, about 1880/1890
- Ohlmannstraße 24 – châteaulike Baroquified building with mansard roof, Rococo Revival pavilion, possibly from the 1920s
- Steinweg 2 – four-floor Expressionist shophouse, 1922; commercial building
- Steinweg 8 – Alte Apotheke (“Old Pharmacy”); rich three-floor timber-frame building, marked 1592
- At Steinweg 15 – relief stone of a Late Baroque portal, marked 1769
- Steinweg 16 – “Haus Fuchs”; former Salm-Salm government chancellery, 1760–1765, architect Johann Thomas Petri; Late Baroque building with hipped mansard roof, marked destroyed 1798/renewed 1933, architect Friedrich Otto, Kirn (?)
- Steinweg 17 – shophouse; three-floor Baroque Revival building with hipped mansard roof, 1920s/1930s, architect Otto, Kirn
- Steinweg 25 – “Goldener Löwe”; shophouse, former smithy; Late Baroque solid building, marked 1791
- Steinweg 41 – “Haus Benkelberg”; shophouse; three-floor building with hipped mansard roof, Art Nouveau, about 1900/1910
- Sulzbacher Straße – former garden enclosure; Art Nouveau, about 1905
- Sulzbacher Straße 15 – one-and-a-half-floor three-wing Late Classicist house, about 1880
- Teichweg 3 – three-floor corner building formerly belonging to Schloss Amalienlust, about 1780/1790, upper floor 1920s
- Teichweg 6/8 – two-and-a-half-floor Late Classicist pair of semi-detached houses, latter half of the 19th century
- Teichweg 7 – former Schloss Amalienlust, pavilion; Late Baroque building with hipped mansard roof, about 1780/1790; see also no. 11
- Teichweg 11a – house, Late Baroque building with hipped mansard roof, 18th century
- Teichweg 11 – former Schloss Amalienlust, pavilion; Late Baroque building with hipped mansard roof, about 1780/1790; see also no. 7
- Teichweg 12 – theatre of the former Schloss Amalienlust; Late Baroque-Early Classicist building with hip roof, about 1780/1790
- Teichweg 24 – Historicized Art Nouveau building, 1906
- Teichweg 26 – house, Heimatstil with Gothic Revival motifs, about 1900/1905
- Teichweg 28 – Late Classicist house, latter half of the 19th century
- Teichweg 30 – villalike Late Classicist house, latter half of the 19th century
- Übergasse 6 – house, building with mansard roof, clinker brick, Renaissance Revival, about 1900
- Übergasse 7 – shophouse; Baroque timber-frame building, late 17th century
- At Übergasse 8a – armorial stone, at the former Piarist College, “Haus Holinga”, Late Baroque, marked 1770
- Übergasse 10 – two shophouses, timber-frame, partly slated, 16th century and about 1800
- Übergasse 12 – Late Baroque building with mansard roof, possibly from the latter half of the 18th century
- Übergasse 14 – three-floor timber-frame house, partly slated, 17th century
- Übergasse 18 – three-floor shophouse with knee wall, about 1800
- Übergasse 20 – three-floor shophouse with knee wall, timber-frame, about 1800
- Denkmalzone Übergasse 5–9, 10–14, 18, 20, Kirchstraße 1, 2, Sackgasse 2 – mostly continuous two- to three-floor row of buildings from the 16th to 19th centuries, among them mainly timber-frame houses
- Wassergasse 3 – timber-frame house, partly solid, about 1800
- Wilhelm-Dröscher-Platz 1 – former Amt court; three-floor sandstone building, Renaissance Revival, 1876; sculptural adornment, sculptor Hanna Cauer, Bad Kreuznach; entrance design Friedrich Otto sen.
- Wörther Weg 10–14 (monumental zone) – façade made less tight by spire lights, oriel windows and timber-frame sections of five one-and-a-half- to two-and-a-half-floor houses, about 1905
- Wörtherweg 13 – Late Gründerzeit house, 1907, building entrepreneur Franz Reuther
- Bismarck Column on the Gauskopf, melaphyre-block building, 1901
- Castle Kyrburg ruin (monumental zone) – mentioned in 1128, expansion into palatial castle in the 16th century, destroyed in 1734; preserved a Baroque dwelling building, 18th century (about 1764?), ruin of a Renaissance building; slope retaining walls, vaulted cellar, remnants of round towers, former gunpowder tower, marked 1526, Eselsbrunnen (“Ass’s Fountain”) (see also below)

==== Kallenfels ====
- Castle Steinkallenfels ruin – mentioned in 1158, in 1682/1684 blown up, remnants of the three castles “Stock im Hane”, “Kallenfels” with keep and wall remnants, “Stein” with gate tower, shield and ringwalls, round towers and so on (see also below)
- Evangelical church, Burgweg 12 – Gothic Revival quarrystone building, latter half of the 19th century
- Eulenweg 1 – former school; one-floor Gründerzeit group of buildings, marked 1895
- At Kallenfelser Hof 1 – spolia, armorial stone, possibly from the 16th or 17th century
- Kallenfelser Hof 4 – remnant of a round tower

==== Kirn-Sulzbach ====
- Evangelical Church, Kirner Straße 62 – Baroque aisleless church, essentially from the 18th century
- Saint Joseph Calasanz's Catholic Church (Kirche St. Josef Calasanza) – inside Kirner Straße 79, two Baroque stone altars, endowed in 1753, design possibly by Johann Thomas Petri, execution by Johann Philipp Maringer
- Kirner Straße, at the graveyard – warriors’ memorial 1914–1918, stele with relief, 1920s, expanded after 1945
- Near Kirner Straße 85 – drink kiosk, 1929

=== More about buildings ===
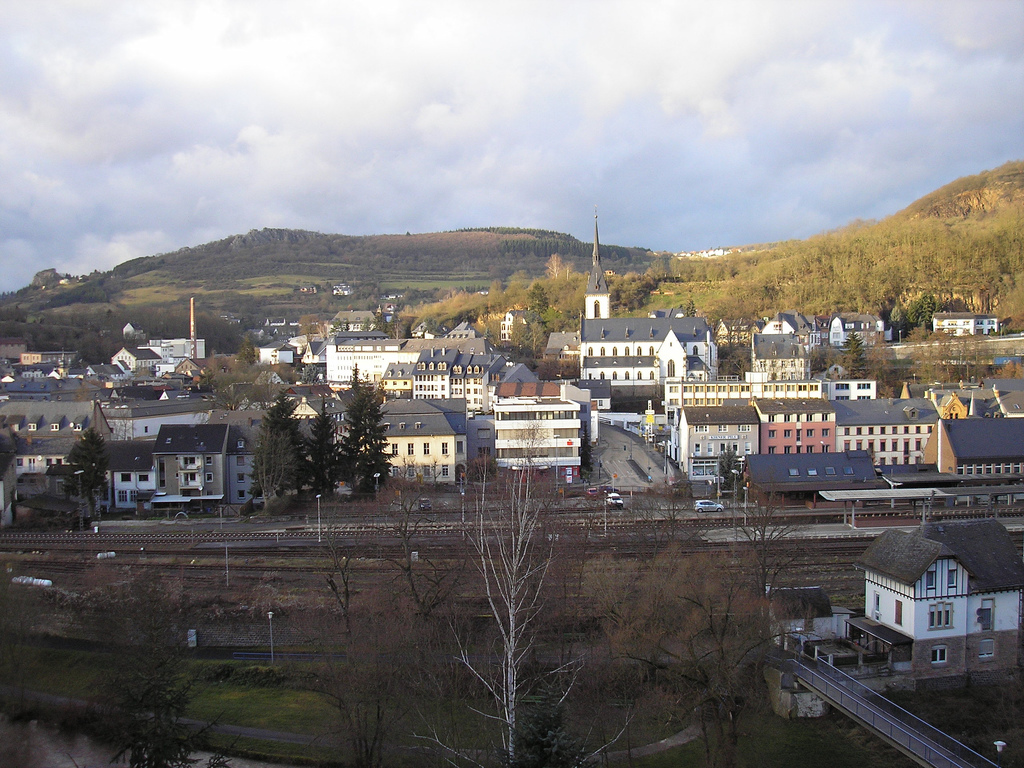
View from the Nahe's right bank of Kirn's Catholic church; before it (to the right) the railway station

==== Evangelical church ====
This Gothic Revival hall church, originally consecrated to Saint Pancras, with its Late Gothic quire and Romanesque steeple from the 11th or 12th century was renovated in 1992 and 1993 to give it back its original form and interior design. Inside are found several tombs of Walgraves-Rhinegraves that are worth seeing. Between 1681 and 1892, the church served both Protestants and Catholics as a simultaneous church. During this time, a wall split off the Protestant section of the church from the sanctuary, which was reserved for the Catholics. After the frightful flood of 1875, new building was required at the church. As a result of this, the Catholics thought it best to build themselves their own church on Halmer Weg.

==== Princely winery ====
The princely winery building was built about 1771 on Prince Dominik von Salm-Kyrburg's orders. The horseshoe-shaped building, whose front is still adorned with the princely family's coat of arms in its original form, was built by master builder Johann Thomas Petri from Schneppenbach. After the Second World War and until 1990, the building housed a fruit juicing plant. After standing empty for several years, the left wing, along with the main entrance, was converted into a hotel with a restaurant in 2005. The rest of the building is now used as dwellings.

==== Kyrburg ====
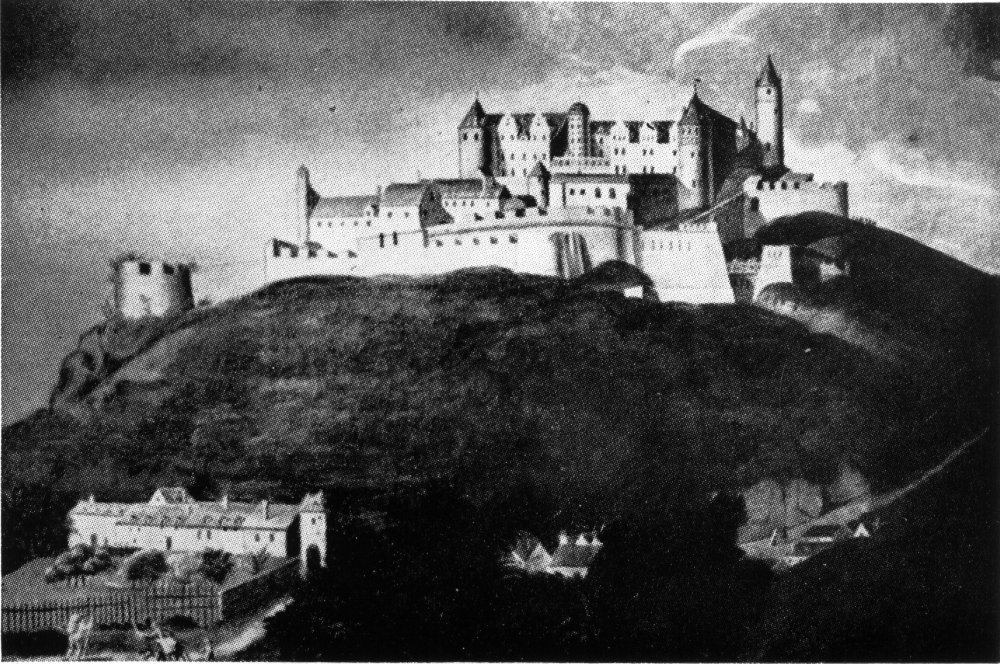
The Kyrburg in the 17th century, painting at Schloss Anholt

Kirn's foremost landmark, standing above the town, is the Kyrburg (also written “Kirburg”), a former hill castle, now a ruin. It lies between the Nahe and Hahnenbach valleys high above Kirn. In 1128, the Kyrburg had its first documentary mention in a document from Count Emich de Kirberc. The castle was one of the seats held by the Waldgraves (whose successors were the Emichones). By the late 13th century, the Waldgraves had split into several lines, one of which named itself after the Kyrburg. In 1409, the Rhinegraves took over the holding through marriage. In the Thirty Years' War, after being occupied by the Spaniards, the Swedes and Imperial troops, it fell into French hands in 1681. Eight years later, a replacement of the defensive complexes was undertaken. In 1734, the stronghold was once again under French occupation, and in the course of the War of the Polish Succession, it was blown up. The ruin thereafter served the townsfolk as a stone quarry. In 1764, Prince Johann Dominik had the garrison house built, which nowadays houses the Restaurant Kyrburg, and in the cellar, the well known whisky museum. In 1908, the castle complex past into the ownership of the Princes of Salm-Salm; since 1988, it has been owned by the town of Kirn. As an outdoor stage, the ruin offers a dramatic backdrop for cultural events. In the past, several operas have been staged there (mainly ones by Giuseppe Verdi). It is also a venue for plays, concerts and celebrations.

==== Steinkallenfels ====
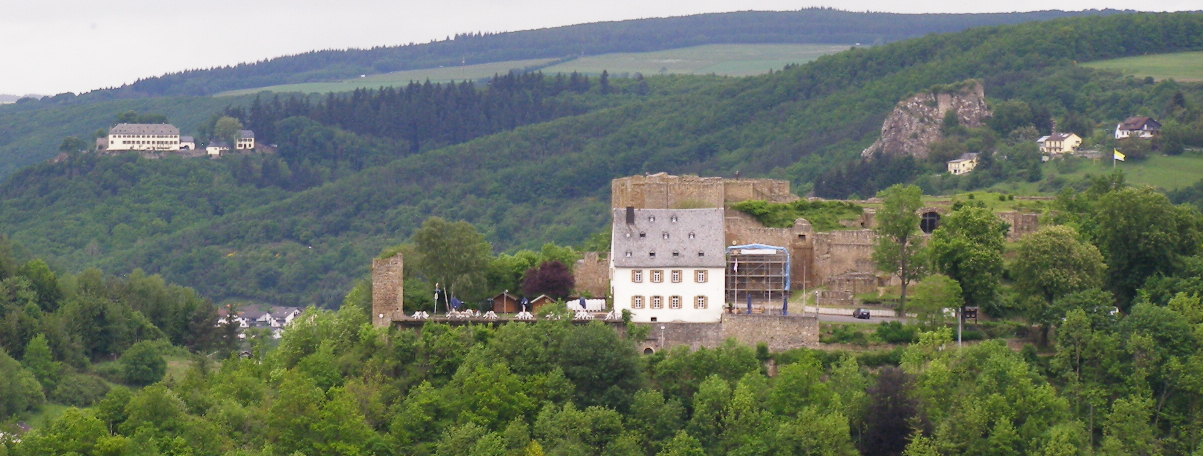
The Kyrburg above Kirn, Stein-Kallenfels and Schloss Wartenstein in the background

Steinkallenfels (also written “Stein-Kallenfels”) is yet another hill castle ruin in Kirn, this one in outlying Kallenfels. In 1158, the castle had its first documentary mention. It was originally a fief held by the Lords of Stein, later called the Lords of Steinkallenfels, who died out in 1778. Beginning in the 14th century, it was a jointly held castle. As long ago as 1615, the castle was described as being in a state of disrepair. Eventually, in either 1682 or 1684, it was blown up by the French and has been a ruin ever since. The castle uses the spectacular natural ledge, of which the nearby formation, the Oberhauser Felsen (also called the “Kirner Dolomiten”), is also a part, that lies athwart the Hahnenbach valley. The castle is actually three castle complexes on separate crags. Standing on the lowest crag is a castle that had fallen into disrepair as early as the 16th century, called “Stock im Hane”. It has no appreciable wall remnants. On another crag stands the Kallenfels with a square keep, but there is no access to this site. Highest up sits the castle Stein, which with its neck ditch, gate tower, bastions, shield wall and five-sided keep set back from the side of any expected attack. The three castles were joined together by defensive passages, of which only a few remnants have been preserved. The complex is now under private ownership, and is not reachable to visitors all the way down to the lowest crags. The ruins can, however, be seen quite well from the road.

==== Town hall ====
Today's town hall was built in the years from 1752 to 1771. The master builder Johann Thomas Petri built here, once again on Prince Dominik's orders, a Piarist monastery, which was nevertheless used as such for only a few years. The building later served for more than a century as a Progymnasium or a Realschule, before it was obtained by the town administration in 1938. The former monastery chapel now houses the council chamber. Belonging to the complex is a pavilion that originally stood in the extensive garden complex. Today the eight-sided building stands on the Hahnenbach's right bank at the marketplace.

==== Hellberg ====
From the country house named “St. Johannisberg” is an outstanding view, dominated as it is by the Hellberg, the biggest stone run north of the Alps. Although it is in an area where stone has long been quarried, it is a natural formation made up of weathered stone. The stones slowly slide down the slope over time. Quarrying is not allowed, as the Hellberg lies within a conservation area.

=== Synagogue ===
Beginning in the early 1870s there was a Jewish prayer room in Kirn. Rented for this purpose was a backyard behind the inn “Zur Krone” on Übergasse (a lane), which had once been used as a gymnasium (today a carpark occupies this spot). In 1887, the foundation stone was laid for a synagogue on Amthofstraße, whose architects and building contractors were the Brothers Benkelberg from Kirn. On 24 and 25 February 1888, the synagogue was festively consecrated. The building was conjoined with its neighbours, which all stood in an unbroken row, and its eaves faced the street. The side with the eaves was framed with lesenes between which were found windows, Rundbogen windows in both the outer fields and above these tracery-filled round windows, while in both the inner fields, twinned windows with mullions, also topped with tracery. A report appeared about the consecration in the Kirner Zeitung on 26 February 1888:

“On 24 and 25 February, on the part of the local Jewish religious community, the consecration of its newly built synagogue took place. From near and far, a great number of coreligionists attended to participate in this lovely festival. The consecration unfolded according to a programme. At 3 o’clock in the afternoon in the old synagogue, the farewell service took place amid the removal of the Torah scrolls. Hereupon, the procession made its way to the new synagogue, which was made up of the following: schoolchildren and teachers, music, synagogue choir, the community elders with the Torah scrolls, accompanied by the festival virgins, rabbis and cantors, Mr. Mayor and the synagogue board, the guests of honour, the members of the worship community and a great number of festival participants. Having reached the new synagogue, Rabbi Dr. Goldschmidt held a short but apt speech, whereupon Mr. Michel II’s little daughter, who had borne the key to the new synagogue on a cushion in the festive procession, passed this to the building contractor Mr. Benkelberg. He thereupon handed the key over to the mayor, Mr. Rau, who as representative of the town handed it to the synagogue board, who then delivered it to the rabbi for the purpose of opening the synagogue. After all the festival participants had entered the new temple, the consecration and the festive service took place, at which we cannot fail to express our full approval to Rabbi Dr. Goldschmidt for his exceedingly bold consecration speech. After the conclusion of this celebration came a service and following this at the community hall was a great festive meal, partaking of which were not only festival attenders but also a great number of local citizens. The festive meal proceeded in the nicest way and the Gregorius’sche Musikkapelle (orchestra) contributed much to its beautification. The job of food catering was given to a Jewish restaurateur from Kreuznach, while the drink catering was taken care of by a local innkeeper. Yesterday morning, there was once again a festive service at the synagogue. The concert announced for 4 o’clock yesterday afternoon at the community hall was attended by quite a number and spread with its precise presentation of the individual musical pieces on the part of the Gregorius’sche Musikkapelle a special enjoyment. At the ball set for the evening many participants likewise showed up and, young and old, kept together merrily through the course of the evening until the early morning hours.”

In February 1928, a commemorative service was held for the synagogue's 40th anniversary. Participating at the celebration were the town's dignitaries, led by Mayor Bongartz. On 28 February 1928, the Kirner Zeitung also published a report about this:

“Memorial service at the synagogue on the occasion of the 40-year anniversary of the existence of the place of worship. On 26 February 1888, the Kirner Zeitung reported on the consecration festivities of the newly built synagogue, which ran a pleasant course amid great participation of the whole citizenry. The former Jewish house of worship was housed before 1888 at the former gymnasium, Übergasse (owner Mr. Nonweiler). Of the generation of that time when the house of worship was built, the last, Mr. L. Rothschild died only a short time ago. In the sermon on Saturday the 25th of this month, Cantor Demant, among others, commemorated the time forty years ago, when the building work was carried out at great sacrifice. The donations flowed richly. It was received as an especially fine stroke of noble humanity that even those fellow townsfolk of other beliefs took part in the donations in great measure, thus earning themselves the Jewish community’s thanks for ever. Certainly a sign of the good comity that prevails among the local citizenry, whatever their faith, then and now. Subsequently, after the sermon, a prayer of thanks was offered for salvation, in which all late donors of any belief were included.”

Ten years later, on Kristallnacht (9–10 November 1938), Brownshirt thugs thrust their way into the synagogue and destroyed the whole institution. Pews and Judaica were dragged outside and burnt. On 13 April 1939, the Jewish community was forced to sell the synagogue property for 5,358 ℛℳ. In connection with the restitution proceedings in 1950, a further payment of 4,000 DM was made. That same year, the building was torn down. A cinema was built there instead. A memorial has recalled the fate of the town's Jewish community and its synagogue since 9 November 1988 – the fiftieth anniversary of Kristallnacht. This can be found on Steinweg between Neue Straße and Langgasse. Another memorial plaque dating from earlier – 1978 – can be found at the memorial to the war dead at the graveyard. The synagogue's address was Amthofstraße 2.

=== Jewish graveyard ===
A Jewish graveyard in Kirn was being mentioned as of 1555 (cadastral area called “off'm Judenkirchhof”), which presumably meant a graveyard for the mediaeval Jewish community. Its whereabouts are now unknown. In 1870, a new graveyard was laid out. It was expanded in 1915. The graveyard's area is 1 000 m^{2}. Preserved on part 1 are 33 graves, and on part 2, 21. In the 1990s, the graveyard was desecrated several times. It lies on Kallenfelser Straße right next to the municipal (Christian) graveyard. The Jewish graveyard actually comprises the north corner of the municipal graveyard, but lies outside the graveyard wall.

=== Cultural and leisure institutions ===
At the community hall (Gesellschaftshaus), which was built in 1879 by the leather company of Carl Simon & Söhne in the Classicist style, concert, cabaret and theatrical events are held the year round by Kulturinitiative Kirn. Twice each year, the hall, big enough for up to 500 people, converts itself into an exhibition hall where, for a fortnight each time, paintings and sculptures, mostly by local artists, are put on display. After intensive conversion work, the family leisure pool “Jahnbad” was opened again in the spring of 2002. Besides the 50 m-long main basin, there is now a leisure basin with a slide, a flow channel and massage couches as well as a wading pool with a little slide. The Kirn town library has been housed since January 2002 at Wilhelm-Dröscher-Haus on the Hahnenbach's left bank. On a floor area of 145 m^{2}, some 5,800 books are available to readers. Thematic specialization involves, besides belles lettres, mainly children's and youth literature.

=== Tourism ===
Kirn is a starting point for the Hunsrück Schiefer- und Burgenstraße (“Hunsrück Slate and Castle Road”), the Soonwaldsteig (hiking trail), the Keltenweg Nahe–Mosel (likewise) and the Lützelsoon-Radweg (cycle path), as well as being a stage on the Nahe-Hunsrück-Mosel-Radweg (another cycle path).

=== Clubs ===
The following clubs are active in Kirn:

- Angelsportverein “Forelle” — angling club
- Angelsportverein “Hahnenbachtal” — angling club
- Arbeiterwohlfahrt Betreuungsverein — workers’ welfare
- Arbeiterwohlfahrt, Ortsverein — workers’ welfare, local chapter
- Behindertensportgruppe Kirn e.V. — disabled sports group
- Brieftaubenverein 08 146 — carrier pigeon club
- Bund der Pfadfinderinnen und Pfadfinder, Stamm Wildgrafen Kirn — scouts’ and guides’ association, Wildgrafen Kirn troop
- Bund für Umwelt und Naturschutz, Ortsgruppe Kirn — environmental and conservation association, local chapter
- Bundesbahn-Sozialwerk — DB charitable organization
- Chorgemeinschaft “Vivace” — choir union
- Club der Briefmarkenfreunde — philately club
- CVJM, Christlicher Verein Junger Menschen — YMCA
- Deutscher Amateur-Radio-Club, Ortsverband Kirn — amateur radio club, local chapter
- Deutsches Rotes Kreuz, Ortsverein Kirn-Stadt und Land — German Red Cross, local chapter for the town and the outlying Verbandsgemeinde
- Deutsch-Russischer-Chor — German-Russian choir
- DLRG Ortsgruppe Kirn e.V. — DLRG, local chapter
- Eagle-Kai-Karate Nahe-Hunsrück e.V.
- Eisenbahn-Turn- und Sportverein — railway gymnastic and sport club
- Evangelische Frauenhilfe — Evangelical women's aid
- Evangelische Frauenhilfe Kirn-Sulzbach — Kirn-Sulzbach Evangelical women's aid
- Evangelische Stadtmission Kirn e.V. — Evangelical town mission
- Evangelischer Jugendtreff “Der Treff” — Evangelical youth meeting place
- Evangelischer Jugendtreff “JuCa” — Evangelical youth meeting place
- Evangelischer Kirchenchor Kirn — Kirn Evangelical church choir
- Evangelischer Kirchenchor Kirn-Sulzbach — Kirn-Sulzbach Evangelical church choir
- FCK-Fanclub Naheteufel — 1. FC Kaiserslautern fan club
- Fischereisportverein — sport fishing club
- Flugsportverein — air sport club
- Förderer der Feuerwehr der Stadt Kirn — fire brigade promoters
- Förderverein des Gymnasiums Kirn e.V. — Gymnasium promotional association
- Förderverein für Jugendarbeit der evangelischen Kirche — promotional association for Evangelical Church youth work
- Förderverein Kita Ohlmannstraße — Ohlmannstraße daycare promotional association
- Förderverein Realschule plus Kirn — Realschule plus promotional association
- Freundeskreis und Förderverein der Hellberg-Grundschule e.V. — Hellberg primary school circle of friends and promotional association
- Gewerbeinitiative Kirner Land — commercial initiative association
- Gymnastikverein Kirn-Sulzbach — gymnastic club
- Handwerksgesellenverein — handicraft club
- Hunsrück Schiefer- und Burgenstraße — “Hunsrück Slate and Castle Road”
- Hunsrückverein e.V. — local history and geography club
- Interessengemeinschaft “Steinweg” — interest group
- “Kallenfelser Eulen” — Shrovetide Carnival (Fastnacht) club
- Karachi-Gruppe-Kirn — church aid group
- Karnevalsgesellschaft “Rappelköpp” — Shrovetide Carnival club
- Katholischer Chor der Pfarreiengemeinschaft Kirn — Catholic church choir
- Kirn aktiv — advertising association
- Kirner Tafel — food bank
- Kolpingfamilie — charitable organization
- Kolpingfamilie Karneval — Shrovetide Carnival charitable organization
- Lions-Club Kirn-Mittlere Nahe
- Männergesangverein “Edelweiß” — men's singing club
- Männergesangverein “Frohsinn” — men's singing club
- Männergesangverein Kallenfels — men's singing club
- Mentor-die Leselernhelfer Nahe-Hunsrück e.V. — language tutoring (reading and speaking)
- Motorradfreunde Kirn e.V. — motorcycle club
- Musikschule KMS e.V. Kirn — music school
- Musikverein 1878 — music club
- Obst- und Gartenbauverein Kirn-Sulzbach — fruitgrowing and gardening club
- Reit-, Fahr- und Zuchtverein — riding club
- Schützenverein 1960 Kirn — shooting sport club
- Schützenverein Kallenfels — shooting sport club
- Siedlergemeinschaft “Über Nahe” — community association
- Spielgemeinschaft 09 Borussia DPSG e.V. — team partnership
- Sport-Club 1911 Kirn-Sulzbach
- Sportfahrerteam “Brunkenstein” — rally racing club
- St.-Georg-Pfadfinder Kirn-Sulzbach DPSG — scouting
- SV Vatanspor Kirn — sport club
- Tanzgruppe “Gingers” des TUS Kirn — dance club
- Tennisclub Kirn
- terre des hommes
- Theatergruppe Kolping — theatrical group
- Tierschutzverein Kirn und Umgebung e.V. — animal welfare
- Tischtennisclub “Grün-Weiß” — table tennis club
- Türkisches und Islamisches Kulturzentrum Kirn und Umgehung e.V. — Turkish and Islamic Cultural Centre
- Turn- und Sportgemeinde 1862 — gymnastic and sport association
- Turn- und Sportgemeinde 1862 Abteilung Tennis — tennis department of foregoing
- Turnverein Kallenfels — gymnastic club
- VCP Verein Christlicher Pfadfinder — Christian scouting
- VdK-Ortsgruppe — social advocacy group local chapter
- Verein der Freunde und Förderer der Dominikschule Kirn e.V. — friends and promoters of the Dominikschule (school)
- Verein der Förderer des Kirner Krankenhauses e.V. — hospital promoters
- Verein der Hundefreunde — dog lovers’ club
- Verein Freunde und Förderer Realschule plus Kirn - Auf Halmen — friends and promoters of the Realschule plus Kirn - Auf Halmen
- Verein für Karate und Selbstverteidigung — karate and self-defence club
- Verein für Rasenspiele 07 Kirn e.V. — grass sport club
- Verschönerungs- und Heimatverein Kirn-Sulzbach — beautification and local history club
- Volkshochschule — folk high school
- Wanderfreunde Kirn-Sulzbach — hiking club

== Economy and infrastructure ==
=== Markets ===
Given its central geographical location, Kirn was always a lively market centre. Still preserved today, alongside the flea markets held on the first Monday of each month, are two prominent markets: the Andreasmarkt – which celebrated its 300th anniversary in 2000 – on the last weekend in November, and the Thomasmarkt on the second Saturday in December. These markets are quite a boon for Kirn in that they always draw many visitors from the surrounding region. At the Handwerker- und Bauernmarkt (“Craftsmen’s and Farmers’ Market”) in October, small businesses from the Kirn area present their handmade wares and offer them for sale. There is also a Wochenmarkt (weekly market – which despite this name is held twice weekly) on Wednesdays and Saturdays.

=== Established businesses ===
Kirn once earned itself countrywide fame as the “Town of Leather”. Most of the tanneries and leather-finishing plants of yore are now long gone, and all that remains of them in town is their head offices. Because such a great deal of the production has been shifted to countries where wages are low, very few people are now employed in the leather industry in Kirn itself. World-famous among what little is left of the industry are the Müller & Meirer Lederwarenfabrik GmbH (locally known as “Müller Hein” and its products marketed under the name Maître) and the Braun GmbH & Co. KG (local name and marketing brand: Braun Büffel). Throughout Rhineland-Palatinate, the town is also well known for its local brewery and the beer that it brews, Kirner Pils. Kirn's biggest employer is SIMONA AG, a worldwide-active manufacturer and distributor of thermoplastic semi-finished products, which originally grew out of the leatherware field. Further important branches of the economy are woodworking, plant construction, the hard-rock industry, packaging and automotive supply. Many small and midsize craft and retail businesses are also represented in town. Over the last few years, tourism, too, has been growing in importance.

=== Education ===
For a town of its size, Kirn has a rather comprehensive offering of educational institutions. Besides five daycare centres and two primary schools, there is the municipal Hauptschule, which as of 1 August 2011 became a Realschule plus. Also available are a Gymnasium (Gymnasium Kirn), a Realschule and the Wilhelm-Dröscher-Schule for pupils with special needs. The vocational schools of the Bad Kreuznach district are represented in Kirn in the fields of mechanics, commerce and industry, home economics, economics and administration. The programmes offered by the folk high school and the music school round out Kirn's educational offerings.

=== Medicine ===
Medical services are supplied by the hospital run by the kreuznacher diakonie (always written with lowercase initials), many general and specialized healthcare professionals who have located in town and five pharmacies. For seniors, the town has two homes for the elderly, both under church sponsorship.

=== Transport ===
Kirn is linked by Bundesstraße 41 to Saarbrücken and Mainz. Leading across the Hunsrück to the Moselle is Landesstraße 184. One can board a train at Kirn on the Nahe Valley Railway (Bingen–Saarbrücken). The travel time on the hourly Regionalexpress trains to Saarbrücken is 1 hour and 10 minutes, while Mainz can be reached in just under an hour. Every other train to and from Frankfurt also runs through to Frankfurt Airport. Frankfurt-Hahn Airport lies some 30 km away from Kirn and can be reached from the town by car in just under a half hour.

=== Media ===
Appearing in Kirn are two local editions of regional daily newspapers: the Kirner Zeitung (Rhein-Zeitung, Koblenz) and the Allgemeine Zeitung (Kirn edition) (Verlagsgruppe Rhein Main, Mainz).

== Notable people ==
Commemorative notice in Detroit for Bernhard Stroh and his brewery

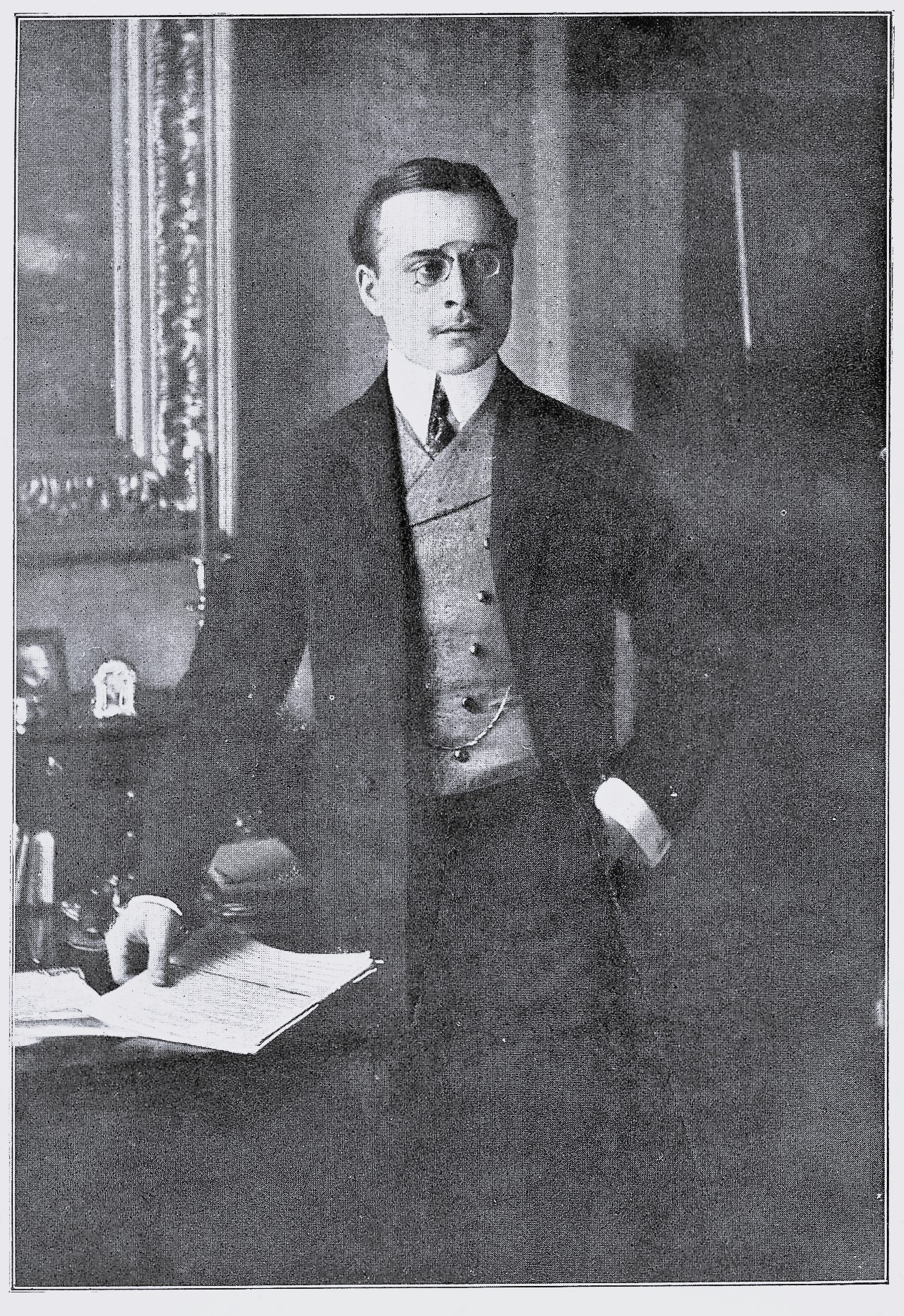
Fritz Oswald Bilse

- Bernhard Stroh (1822–1882) — founder of Strohs Brewing
- Fritz Oswald Bilse (1878–1951) — Prussian officer and writer
- Wilhelm Dröscher (1920–1977) —politician (SPD), member of the Bundestag (MdB), member of the Rhineland-Palatinate Landtag (MdL), SPD federal treasurer
- Werner Schoop (1924–2011) — angiologist, textbook author and recipient of the Order of Merit of the Federal Republic of Germany
- Volker Bierbrauer (b. 1940) — prehistorian and mediaeval archaeologist
- Frank Farian (1941–2024; né Franz Reuther) — music producer (Milli Vanilli, Boney M.)
- Fabian Schönheim (b. 1987) — footballer

=== Schinderhannes ===
Like many places in the region, Kirn can claim to have had its dealings with the notorious outlaw Schinderhannes (or Johannes Bückler, to use his true name). He often found himself in Kirn and the surrounding area. In 1796, he and his accomplices went about stealing mutton several times around Kirn, which they sold to a butcher in town. For other misdeeds, he was punished with 25 strokes of the cane at the marketplace. On 10 December 1796 he was caught and locked up in the dungeon at Kirn town hall, only to escape that very night by way of the roof. On 22 December 1797 he amused himself at the Kirn Christkindchen-Markt (Christmas market) and shortly thereafter committed his first murder in Hundheim.
