= Bierbrauer =

Bierbrauer is a German occupational surname literally meaning "beer brewer". Notable people with the surname include:

- Adolf Bierbrauer
- Günther Bierbrauer
- Volker Bierbrauer
- Werner-Joachim Bierbrauer, birth name of Joachim Siegerist

== See also ==
- Birbraer, Yiddish variant
