= Birbraer =

Birbraer is a Yiddish occupational surname, the cognate of German Bierbrauer, literally "beer brewer". Notable people with the surname include:

- Max Birbraer (born 1980), Kazakhstan-born Israeli former professional ice hockey forward
- Yevgeny Birbraer (1912–1943), Jewish Hero of the Soviet Union
