= Fritz Oswald Bilse =

German writer (1878–1951)

Fritz Oswald Bilse (31 March 1878 in Kirn, Rhine Province – 1951) was a German novelist, playwright and a lieutenant in the Prussian Army. He also used the pseudonyms Fritz von der Kyrburg and Fritz Wernthal.

== Life ==
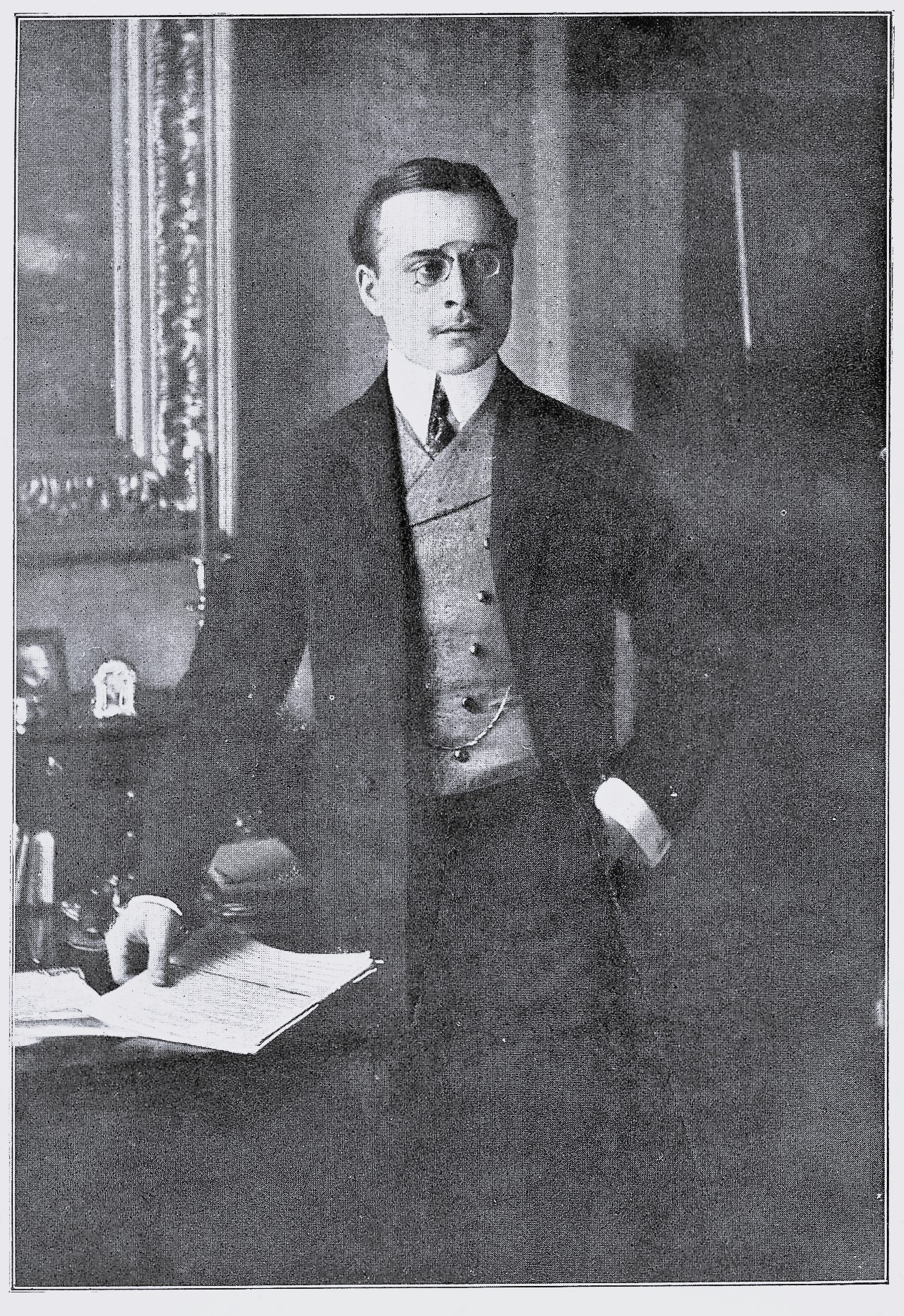
Fritz Oswald Bilse, around 1905

Fritz Oswald Bilse was born in Kirn (present-day Rhineland-Palatinate, then Prussian Rhine Province), the son of a schoolteacher, and grew up in the towns of Kirn and Eisenach. He joined the Prussian army in 1896, and in 1900 was posted with the 16. Train-Bataillon at Forbach in Lorraine. He rose to instant notoriety with his novel Aus einer kleinen Garnison. Ein militärisches Zeitbild (1903). In later editions, he used the pseudonym "Fritz von der Kyrburg", after his home town's most prominent landmark, the Kyrburg castle.

The book, in which Bilse satirizes the manners of the Forbach garrison and of the Prussian army in general, became a succès de scandale and was soon reprinted many times. Bilse's criticism, however, was so sharp, and the location and protagonists so little disguised, that several officers who felt their honour to be under attack prosecuted Bilse in a court-martial, the trial taking place at Metz from 9. to 13. November 1903. Bilse was found guilty of defamation of character, was discharged from the army dishonourably, and sentenced to six months' imprisonment. His novel was (temporarily) banned.

The scandal only served to enhance Bilse's celebrity. He was henceforth described as the German army's enfant terrible; the novel became popular abroad, especially in France, where the label interdit en Allemagne was recognized as a badge of quality. Translations soon appeared, into French and also into English, the latter appearing in 1904 containing a detailed account of the court-martial and a foreword by the German-American author Theodore Dreiser, who praised Bilse as a great realist. The book was also translated into other languages, e.g. into Dutch and Russian.

Thomas Mann referred to Bilse and his novel when he found himself subjected to a "trial by press" ("Preßprozeß") in his home town of Lübeck, a fictionalized description of which he had published in his own novel Buddenbrooks. Mann's essay "Bilse and I" ("Bilse und ich", 1906) defends the right of writers to fictionalize living persons, which had been held against Mann by several of the burghers of Lübeck. However, Mann was also at pains to draw a distinction between "taking liberties and the writer's freedom" ("Frechheit und Freiheit"). Mann further noted that his accusers had called Buddenbrooks a "Bilse-Novel" ("Bilse-Roman"), a phrase which, for a while, became synonymous with roman à clef in German.

Bilse continued his new career as an author for a while, but his subsequent publications could not emulate the success of his debut. After a fifteen-year interruption, he resumed publishing in the mid-1920s with two novels which were once again of a political nature: In Gottes Mühlen. Roman aus einer großen Nation (1924), Bilse portrays a supposedly corrupt and decadent France; whilst the supposed "negro novel" Die schwarze Welle (1925) testifies to Bilse's resentment at the occupation of the Rhineland by French troops of African origin. Furthermore, Bilse was for a time editor of the journal Deutsche Heimat, which articulated nationalistic tendencies close to the "Bündische Jugend", associated with the so-called "conservative revolution".

After his release from prison, Bilse moved around, living in Paris and London, then tending the estate of Frabertsham in Upper Bavaria, then living in Munich and ultimately near Groß-Ziethen. In 1946, he was elected to the state assembly of Brandenburg as a member of the Christian Democratic Union (East Germany). No information can be found on the last years of his life; he died at Eberswalde, near Berlin, in 1951.

Bilse is remembered as the subject of Mann's essay and in controversies surrounding the alleged infringement of personal rights in literary works. In Germany, the case of Bilse is cited as being exemplary to this day. A recent instance can be found in the long lawsuit over Maxim Biller's banned novel Esra (2003), which was compared to the Bilse controversy.

== Works ==
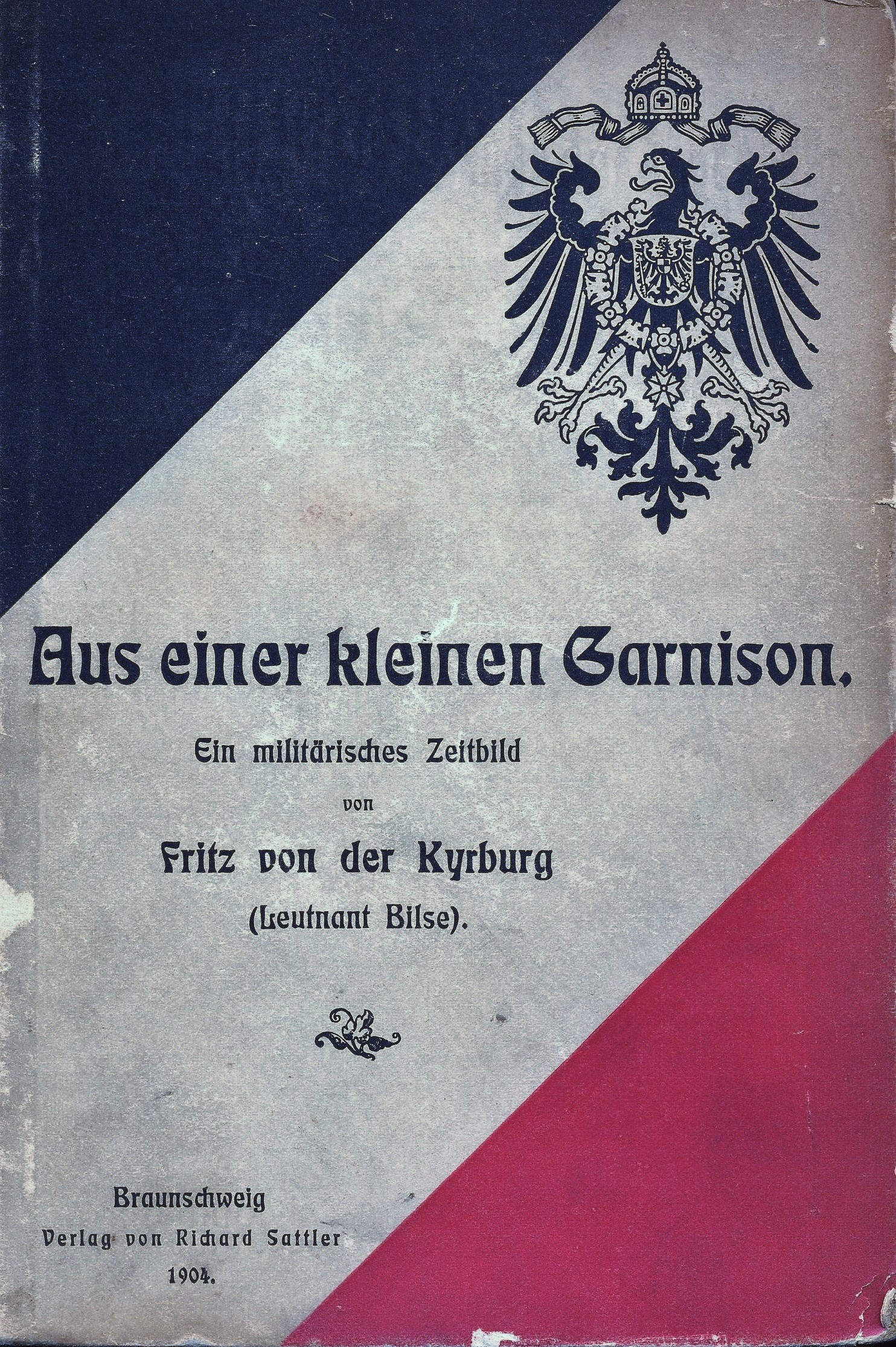
Cover of Aus einer kleinen Garnison, 1904 edition

- Aus einer kleinen Garnison. Ein militärisches Zeitbild (novel, 1903)
  - English translation: Life In A Garrison Town (1904)
- Zwei Militär-Humoresken. Der Alarm. Ein glücklicher Reinfall (1903)
- Das blaue Schloß. Roman in einem Vorkapitel und zwei Büchern (1904)
- Wahrheit (play, 1904)
- Fallobst (play, 1905)
- Lieb' Vaterland. Roman aus dem Soldatenleben (1905)
- Die große Schlacht (play, 1906)
- Stille Wege (novel, 1907)
- Verklärung (novel, 1909)
- Die Technik des Romans (1909)
- Gottes Mühlen. Roman aus einer großen Nation (1924)
- Die schwarze Welle. Ein Negerroman von Afim Assanga, bearbeitet und herausgegeben von Fritz Oswald Bilse (1925)
- Wie kann der Bauer die jetzigen und kommenden schweren Zeiten überstehen und ohne besondere Mehrkosten seine Erträge verdoppeln? : Praktische Ratschläge für den Bauernstand (1928)
