= Baumholder station =

Railway station in Baumholder, Germany

Baumholder
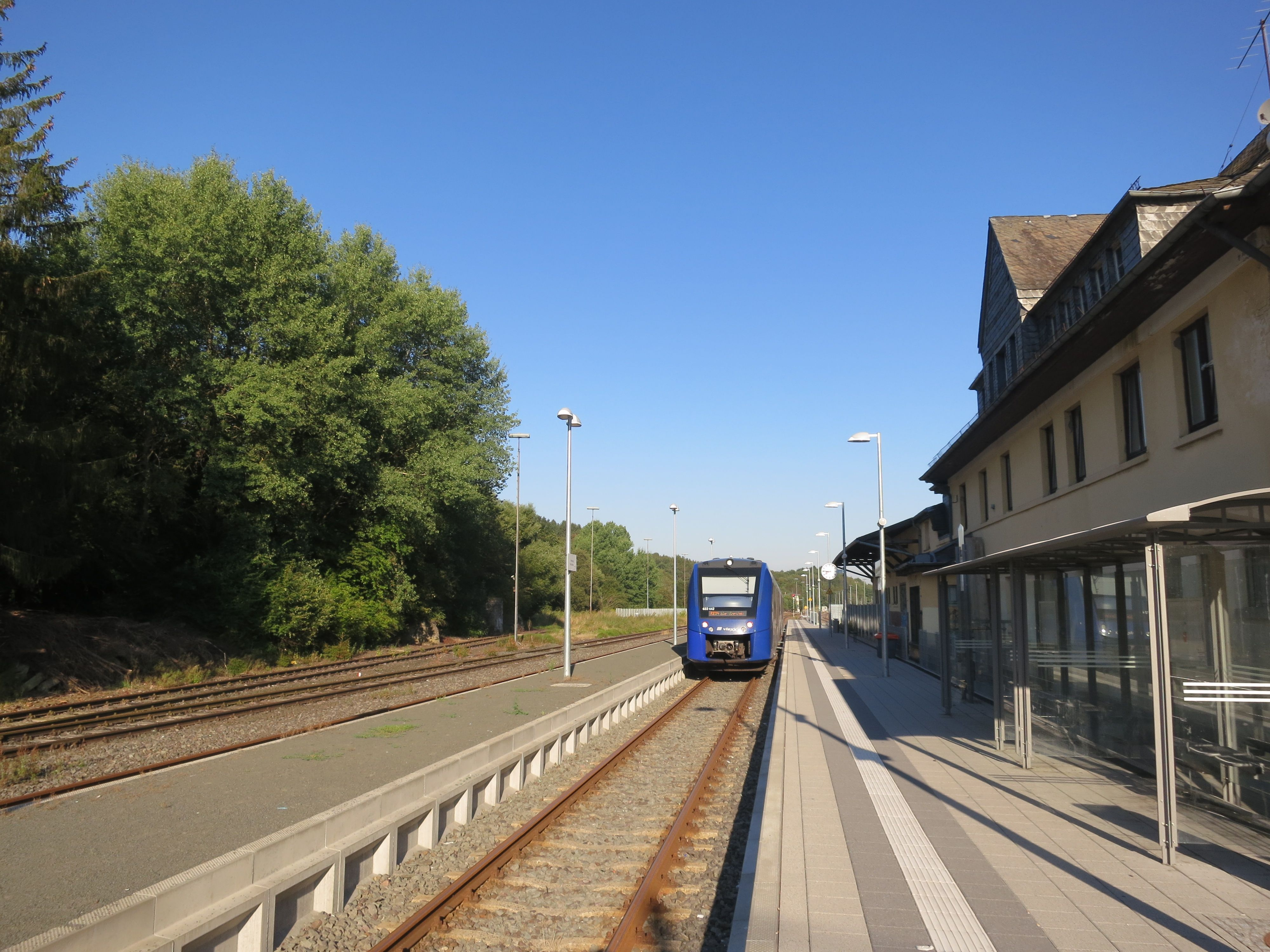
- 2016

General information
- Location: Aulenbacher Straße/Schubertstraße; 55774 Baumholder; Rhineland-Palatinate; Germany
- Coordinates: 49.6124°N 7.3309°E
- Elevation: 421 m (1,381 ft)
- System: Bf
- Owner: Verbandsgemeinde Baumholder
- Operator: RP-Eisenbahn
- Lines: Heimbach (Nahe)–Baumholder railway (KBS 680)
- Platforms: 2 side platforms
- Tracks: 3
- Train operators: vlexx
- Connections: 292 325

Construction
- Parking: yes
- Cycle facilities: yes
- Accessible: yes

Other information
- Station code: -
- DS100 code: SBH
- IBNR: 8007888
- Category: -
- Fare zone: RNN: 451

History
- Opened: 15 December 1912; 113 years ago

Services
Preceding station	Vlexx	Following station
Terminus	RB 34	Ruschberg towards Kirn
Location
- Location within Rhineland-Palatinate Location within Germany Location within Europe

Baumholder station (German: Bahnhof Baumholder) is a railway station in the municipality of Baumholder, located in the Birkenfeld district in Rhineland-Palatinate, Germany.
