= Kirn station =

Railway station in Germany

Kirn

General information
- Location: Bahnhofstraße 14; 55606 Kirn; Rhineland-Palatinate; Germany
- Coordinates: 49.786°N 7.464°E
- Elevation: 189 m (620 ft)
- System: Bf
- Owner: Deutsche Bahn
- Operator: DB Station&Service
- Lines: Nahe Valley Railway (KBS 680)
- Platforms: 1 island platform 1 side platform
- Tracks: 5
- Train operators: vlexx
- Connections: 265 271 272 273 281 283 287 288 352 362 364 365

Construction
- Parking: yes
- Cycle facilities: yes
- Accessible: yes

Other information
- Station code: 3208
- DS100 code: SKR
- IBNR: 8003295
- Category: 5
- Fare zone: RNN: 429 and 430; : 6940 (RNN transitional tariff)
- Website: www.bahnhof.de

Services
Preceding station	Vlexx	Following station
Idar-Oberstein towards Saarbrücken Hbf	RE 3	Bad Sobernheim towards Frankfurt (Main) Hbf
Kirnsulzbach towards Neubrücke (Nahe)	RB 33	Hochstetten (Nahe) towards Wiesbaden Hbf
Kirnsulzbach towards Baumholder	RB 34	Terminus
Location
- Location within Rhineland-Palatinate Location within Germany Location within Europe

Kirn station (German: Bahnhof Kirn) is a railway station in the municipality of Kirn, located in the Bad Kreuznach district in Rhineland-Palatinate, Germany.
