= Volker Bierbrauer =

German archaeologist

Sebastian Brather
- Born: 19 September 1940 (age 86); Kirn, Germany

Academic background
- Education: Ludwig-Maximilians-Universität München

Academic work
- Discipline: Archaeology; History
- Institutions: University of Freiburg; University of Bonn
- Main interests: Archaeology of late antiquity

Volker Bierbrauer (born 19 September 1940) is a German archaeologist and historian.

== Biography ==
Volker Bierbrauer was born in Kirn, Germany on 19 September 1940. He received his PhD in prehistory and ancient history at the Ludwig-Maximilians-Universität München in 1969. He obtained his habilitation in 1977. In 1979, Bierbrauer was appointed as faculty at the University of Bonn. From 1990 to 2006, he was Chair of Prehistory and Protohistory at the Ludwig-Maximilians-Universität München.

Bierbrauer is notable for his research on the archaeology of the Goths and Lombards, and the question of continuity between the classical and medieval period.

Bierbrauer was a Member of the Steering Committee of the Transformation of the Roman World project, which was sponsored by the European Science Foundation. In 2005, he became a full member of the Bavarian Academy of Sciences and Humanities.

== Selected works ==
- Die ostgotischen Grab- und Schatzfunde in Italien, 1969
- Frühgeschichtliche Akkulturationsprozesse in den germanischen Staaten am Mittelmeer (Westgoten, Ostgoten, Langobarden) aus der Sicht des Archäologen, 1980
- Langobarden, Bajuwaren und Romanen im mittleren Alpengebiet im 6. und 7. Jahrhundert, 1993
- Archäologie und Geschichte der Goten vom 1.–7. Jahrhundert, 1994
- Archäologie der Langobarden in Italien, 2005
- Ethnos und Mobilität im 5. Jahrhundert aus archäologischer Sicht, 2008
