= Siegmund Salfeld =

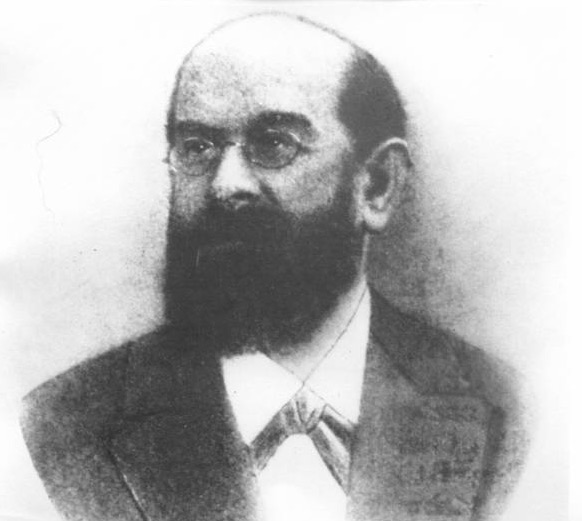
Siegmund Salfeld

Siegmund Salfeld (24 March 1843 – May 1926) was a German rabbi and writer. He was born at Stadthagen, Schaumburg-Lippe.

Having received his degree of Ph.D. from the University of Berlin in 1870, he became in the same year rabbi of Dessau, Anhalt. In 1880 he was chosen rabbi of Mainz. He collaborated on Meyers Konversations-Lexikon and the Jewish Encyclopedia. He died in Mainz, aged 83.

== Works ==
- Fünf Predigten (1879), sermons delivered on different occasions
- Das Hohelied Salomo's bei den Jüdischen Erklärern des Mittelalters (Berlin, 1879)
- Dr. Salomon Herxheimer (Frankfort-on-the-Main, 1885) biography
- Nürnberg im Mittelalter (Kiel, 1894-1896) with M. Stern
- Der Alte Israelitische Friedhof in Mainz (Berlin, 1898)
- Das Martyrologium des Nürnberger Memorbuches (ib. 1898), a work edited for the Gesellschaft für die Geschichte der Juden in Deutschland
- Bilder aus der Vergangenheit der Jüdischen Gemeinde Mainz (Mayence, 1903)
