= Bad Münster am Stein-Ebernburg (Verbandsgemeinde) =

Coordinates: 49°48′36″N 7°50′24″E

Bad Münster am Stein-Ebernburg is a former Verbandsgemeinde ("collective municipality") in the district of Bad Kreuznach, Rhineland-Palatinate, Germany. On 1 January 2017 it was disbanded, and its member municipalities were divided over the Verbandsgemeinden Rüdesheim and Bad Kreuznach. The seat of the Verbandsgemeinde was in Bad Münster am Stein-Ebernburg, itself not part of the Verbandsgemeinde anymore since 1 July 2014.

At the time it was disbanded (January 2017), the Verbandsgemeinde Bad Münster am Stein-Ebernburg consisted of the following Ortsgemeinden ("local municipalities"):

1. Altenbamberg
2. Duchroth
3. Feilbingert
4. Hallgarten
5. Hochstätten
6. Niederhausen
7. Norheim
8. Oberhausen an der Nahe
9. Traisen

Of these municipalities, Duchroth, Niederhausen, Norheim, Oberhausen an der Nahe and Traisen joined the Verbandsgemeinde Rüdesheim; Altenbamberg, Feilbingert, Hallgarten and Hochstätten joined the Verbandsgemeinde Bad Kreuznach.
