= Feilbingert =

- Municipality
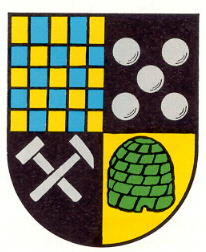
- Coat of arms

- Location of Feilbingert within Bad Kreuznach district
- Interactive map of Feilbingert
- Location within Germany Location within Rhineland-Palatinate
- Coordinates: 49°46′48″N 7°48′17″E
- Country: Germany
- State: Rhineland-Palatinate
- District: Bad Kreuznach
- Municipal assoc.: Bad Kreuznach

Government
  - Mayor (2019–24): Andrea Silvestri (CDU)

Area
  - Total: 10.05 km^{2} (3.88 sq mi)
- Elevation: 270 m (890 ft)

Population (2025-12-31)
  - Total: 1,562
  - Density: 155.4/km^{2} (402.5/sq mi)
- Time zone: UTC+01:00 (CET)
  - Summer (DST): UTC+02:00 (CEST)
- Postal codes: 67824
- Dialling codes: 06708
- Vehicle registration: KH
- Website: feilbingert.de

Feilbingert is an Ortsgemeinde – a municipality belonging to a Verbandsgemeinde, a kind of collective municipality – in the Bad Kreuznach district in Rhineland-Palatinate, Germany. It belongs to the Verbandsgemeinde of Bad Kreuznach, whose seat is in the like-named town. The municipality's name is a fusion of the names Feil and Bingert, borne by two formerly separate villages that likewise fused together.

== Geography ==
=== Location ===
Feilbingert lies on a high plateau near the northernmost edge of the North Palatine Uplands amidst vineyards and woodlands, about 5 km south of Bad Münster am Stein-Ebernburg and some 10 km away from the district seat, Bad Kreuznach. It has some 1,750 inhabitants.

=== Neighbouring municipalities ===
Clockwise from the north, Feilbingert's neighbours are the town of Bad Münster am Stein-Ebernburg and the municipalities of Altenbamberg, Hochstätten, Hallgarten, Oberhausen an der Nahe and Niederhausen. Feilbingert also comes within several metres of the municipality of Alsenz in the neighbouring Donnersbergkreis but does not meet it at a boundary. A similar situation exists between Feilbingert and its near neighbour the municipality of Duchroth.

=== Constituent communities ===
Feilbingert's Ortsteile are Bingert and Feil, two formerly separate villages that have been united, as have their names. Also belonging to Feilbingert are the outlying homesteads of Lemberghaus, Lemberghütte, Lüßerttal and Waldhof.

== History ==
When a village arose at what is now Feilbingert has not yet been determined with any certainty. Modern readers can but make do with first documentary mentions from the earliest time of settlement. Feil made its first appearance in written history in 1212 under the name Vilde, which meant “Location at treeless, even, farmed field” (and indeed it is cognate with the English word “field”). Through sound shifts and misunderstandings of the name's meaning, the form Fyle arose by 1440, and by 1788, this had become Feil, the form still used today for that part of the municipality. In 1071, Bingert had its first documentary mention in the Codex Laureshamensis, the book of documents kept by the former Imperial Abbey at Lorsch, as Binegarten or Bingarden (depending on the source). This wealthy monastery had holdings all up and down the Rhine and up its tributaries as well, from Switzerland down to the Netherlands. These towns, villages and estates contributed to the monks’ livelihood, and Binegarden was no exception. Sound shifts had by 1837 yielded the form Bingert, also still in use today. Bingert formed together with Feil, Ebernburg and Norheim the “Lordship of Ebernburg”. The Ebernburg passed from the Rhenish-Franconian Dukes to the Salians, and from them as a fief and by other ways to various comital houses. For example, in 1212, the church at Ebernburg was transferred to the Neuhausen Foundation near Worms, together with the great tithes that it commanded from Feil's and Bingert's municipal areas. It was at this time that Feil had its first documentary mention. By inheritance, the Vogtei of Ebernburg passed in 1214 to the Counts of Leiningen from the House of Saarbrücken. Conrad V, the Prince-Bishop of Speyer, concluded an hereditary treaty between the brothers Friedrich and Emich of Leiningen on 18 October 1237:

Conrad, by God’s grace Bishop of Speyer, offers compliments in the Lord to all whom this writing reaches … Thus, belonging to Friedrich, the Count of Leiningen, is Castle Hartenberg … Belonging to his brother Emich, however, is Castle Frankenstein with the incomes from the “curacy” of Businsheim … likewise Bingert (Binegardin), Ebernburg and Feil (Vilde) … This is given before our faces and the castellans and the ministerial officials … in the Lord's year 1237 on the morning of the Feast of Luke the Evangelist.

In 1338, Raugrave Rubrecht von Altenbaumburg cropped up as owner of Castle Ebernburg. He pledged the castle, with the exceptions of Feil and Bingert, in 1347 to Count Wolfram of Sponheim against a loan of 2,500 Rhenish guilders. In 1381, Raugrave Heinrich ceded ownership of the castle and the village, and somewhat later also Feil and Bingert, to Count Simon III at Sponheim – Kreuznach line – and in 1394, even the Schenk von Erbach forsook all rights of claim against it. Thus, the Ebernburg, together with its appurtenances Feil, Bingert and Norheim, passed to the Counts of Sponheim. The last Count of Sponheim, named Johann, pledged the castle, with its appurtenances in 1430 to the House of Winterbach because he owed them 1,200 guilders, but reserved the right to cancel the pledge on six months' notice and refund the money. Although the 1440 agreement between Electoral Palatinate, Baden and the County of Veldenz explicitly repeated that Ebernburg, the castle and the dale, along with the villages of Feil, Bingert and Norheim, were not to be alienated, the House of Winterbach nonetheless transferred their pledge rights to Dietrich Knebel von Katzenellenbogen, whose wife was Eva von Winterbach. The Sickingens acquired from Count Palatine Friedrich at Simmern and Margrave Jakob of Baden in 1448 leave to take the official pledge upon themselves. By the upheavals of history, Feil and Bingert passed in the 15th century as a pledge to Reinhard of Sickingen, Franz's grandfather. From this time, too, come the first accounts of mining on the Lemberg. Mentioned in them is the recovery of cinnabar from the pits "Geiskammer" and "Ernesti Glück". Franz von Sickingen was born in 1481 at Castle Ebernburg. He was a follower of the Reformation and replaced Catholic church services at the church in Feil with Protestant ones. At the time of the Thirty Years' War (1618-1648), the Feilbingert area was devastated by Spanish troops. They ruled the whole region for almost 12 years. When Swedish King Gustav II Adolf conquered Kreuznach in March 1632, beating the Spanish, the Spaniards’ allies, the Croats, under Captain Matthias Gallas’s leadership, latched onto the village of Bingert. These events brought the mining on the Lemberg to an end. Franz von Sickingen’s descendants wanted to reestablish Catholicism in the 17th century, which led to the Frankfurt religious troubles, and indeed even to an insurrection. The upshot was that the church at Feil was closed, the church property was seized, and then the church was torn down, about 1720. The last of the von Sickingen-Ebernburgs died in 1768 and bequeathed his earthly goods and jurisdiction to Electoral Palatinate, whose government then granted the Protestants in Feil leave to build a new church where the old one had been torn down with Saint Michael as its patron. The Catholics were granted simultaneum rights at this church, and services were held by Carmelites from Kreuznach. The two villages’ combined population in those days was 590. Feil and Bingert lay right near each other, but there was still unbuilt land between them at that time. Nevertheless, they already formed a united municipality. The quicksilver mines on the Lemberg were opened again. At one of the mines, “Drei Züge”, alone, 20 men worked, whereas there were six at the “Geiskammer”. At another pit near Feil, eight workers worked a coal seam. There was considerable economic growth at the time. After the Congress of Vienna, Feilbingert belonged to the Kingdom of Bavaria, and this did not change until after the Second World War, although Bavaria, along with the Palatine exclave in which Feilbingert found itself, became a “Free State” when the kingdom itself met its end when the Kaiser was overthrown and along with him Bavaria's last king. The current municipality of Feilbingert came into being when the municipalities of Feil and Bingert agreed to a merger. Until about 1950, there was still a greenbelt between the two centres, but since then, new building zones have been laid out there, and the two centres have thus fused into one. As a result of administrative restructuring in Rhineland-Palatinate in 1969, the village was transferred from the old Rockenhausen district to the Bad Kreuznach district, within which it was grouped into the Verbandsgemeinde of Bad Münster am Stein-Ebernburg. It was formerly also part of the Regierungsbezirk of Koblenz, until Rhineland-Palatinate abolished its Regierungsbezirke. Ecclesiastically, Feilbingert belongs, as it long has, to the Evangelical Church of the Palatinate and the Roman Catholic Diocese of Speyer.

=== Historical figures’ visits ===
Today, Feilbingert presents itself as a modern, but at the same time tradition-minded, village. Martin Luther even visited what is now the municipality, at the foot of the Lemberg, the highest peak on the Nahe (421 m above sea level), about the time when he refused Franz von Sickingen's offer of asylum at the Ebernburg. Centuries later, Kaiser Wilhelm I's journey through the region was thwarted by a storm and he had to abide in the village overnight at an inn.

=== Population development ===
Feilbingert's population development since Napoleonic times is shown in the table below. The figures for the years from 1871 to 2005 are drawn from census data:

Year	Inhabitants
1815	709
1835	1,154
1871	1,144
1905	1,263
1939	1,170

Year	Inhabitants
1950	1,287
1961	1,295
1970	1,516
1987	1,473
2005	1,741

== Religion ==
As at 31 August 2013, there are 1,615 full-time residents in Feilbingert, and of those, 716 are Evangelical (44.334%), 615 are Catholic (38.08%), 18 (1.115%) belong to other religious groups and 266 (16.471%) either have no religion or will not reveal their religious affiliation.

== Politics ==
=== Municipal council ===
The council is made up of 16 council members, who were elected by proportional representation at the municipal election held on 7 June 2009, and the honorary mayor as chairman. The municipal election held on 7 June 2009 yielded the following results:

Year	SPD	CDU	FDP	Total
2009	5	7	4	16 seats
2004	6	7	3	16 seats

=== Mayor ===
Feilbingert's mayor is Andrea Silvestri.

=== Coat of arms ===
The municipality's arms might be described thus: Quarterly first chequy of twenty-five Or and azure, second sable five roundles in saltire argent, third sable a hammer and pick in saltire and fourth Or a beehive vert.

The coat of arms also appears on the municipal flag, which otherwise consists of two horizontal stripes in green and white.

== Culture and sightseeing ==
=== Buildings ===
The following are listed buildings or sites in Rhineland-Palatinate’s Directory of Cultural Monuments:

==== Bingert ====
- Saint Michael’s Catholic Parish Church (Pfarrkirche St. Michael), Ebernburger Straße 17 – Gothic Revival aisleless church, marked 1868; in the churchyard missionary cross, marked 1897 and 1920; Baroque Bildstock, 18th century
- Ebernburger Straße 14 – estate complex along the street; Classicist building with half-hip roof, marked 1836, commercial wing, partly timber-frame
- Ebernburger Straße 19 – Catholic rectory; two-part Late Classicist plastered building, third fourth of the 19th century
- Kolpingstraße 1 – timber-frame house, Late Baroque building with half-hip roof, partly timber-frame, possibly latter half of the 18th century
- Lembergstraße 16 – Baroque timber-frame house, partly solid, mid 18th century, house door marked 1882
- Lembergstraße 30 – bungalow, about 1820/1830
- Former quicksilver mine, on the Lemberg – 15th century and later
- Lemberghaus, east of Oberhausen, at the foot of the Lemberg – former administration building of the Kirner Hartsteinwerke (“hard-stone works”), ten-axis quarrystone building, 1925; belonging with it eight-sided wellhouse with pyramid roof

==== Feil ====
- Martin Luther Evangelical church (Martin-Luther-Kirche), Ringstraße 18 – Late Baroque quarrystone building, hip roof, 1768, west tower, marked 1895
- Martin-Luther-Straße, graveyard – 1920s, after 1945 newly organized and expanded, warriors’ memorial 1914/1918 and 1939/1945, four steles with reliefs, sarcophagus
- Martin-Luther-Straße 5 – former Evangelical rectory; now ordinary house, Late Baroque building with half-hip roof, latter half of the 18th century
- Martin-Luther-Straße 8 – Baroque building with half-hip roof, timber-frame, plastered, possibly earlier half of the 18th century
- Martin-Luther-Straße 12 – Baroque timber-frame house, plastered, 18th century
- In Martin-Luther-Straße 22 – equipment of the Besucherschmiede Blätz (visitable blacksmith;s shop)
- Oberhauser Straße 4 – Baroque timber-frame house, 18th century
- Oberhauser Straße 10 – house, post-Baroque building with half-hip roof, timber-frame, marked 1813
- Ringstraße 1 – house, Late Baroque building with half-hip roof, partly timber-frame, latter half of the 18th or early 19th century

=== Clubs ===
Feilbingert has a great number of clubs. Currently active in the municipality are the following:

- Angelsportverein “Silbersee” 1989 e.V. — angling club
  - Founded in 1989, its “club fishing pond” is the Silbersee on the Lemberg, which is under conservational protection.
- Bauern- und Winzerverein Feilbingert — farmers' and winegrowers' association
  - Founded in the late 1940s.
- Club der Naturfreunde Feilbingert — Friends of Nature
  - Founded in 1962, the club undertakes yearly outings, hikes and sightseeing trips led by knowledgeable guides.
- DRK-Ortsverein Feilbingert — German Red Cross
  - Founded on 1 May 1978, this local chapter works with the blood donation service in Bad Kreuznach to set up regular blood donor clinics at the Lemberghalle in Feilbingert.
- Evangelischer Kirchenchor — Evangelical church choir
  - Founded in 1961.
- Evangelischer Krankenpflegeverein — Evangelical nursing association
- FCK Fanclub Lembergteufel Feilbingert — 1. FC Kaiserslautern fan club
  - Founded in 1990.
- Förderverein Freunde der Feuerwehr e.V. — 'Friends of the Fire Brigade' promotional association
  - Founded in 1982.
- FKK - Feilbingert Karneval Club e.V. — Shrovetide Carnival (Fastnacht) club
  - Founded in 1996.
- Imkerverein Lemberg e.V. — beekeeping club
  - Founded about 1930, the club’s members come from the area around the Lemberg. Members from Feilbingert are nevertheless the majority, for Feilbingert has a long beekeeping tradition, thus explaining the charge in the fourth field of the municipal coat of arms – a beehive. The name Bingert itself may even be a corruption of Bienengarten (“bee garden”). The members have dedicated themselves to the strict requirements of the German Beekeepers' Association (Deutscher Imkerbund).
- Interessengemeinschaft Gewerbetreibender — business owners' association
  - Founded in 1986.
- Katholischer Kirchenchor “St. Michael” Feilbingert — “Saint Michael's” Catholic church choir
  - Founded in 1920 as Pfarrcäcilien-Männerchor (men’s choir), since 1947, women have also been members. At that time, the choir was called Chor St. Cäcilia. There are almost 40 members.
- Katholischer Krankenpflegeverein (Elisabethenverein) — Catholic nursing association
  - The club is linked to the Speyer Caritas station and as such supports the parish (Saint Michael's) in its charitable work. It has more than 150 members in Feilbingert and neighbouring Hallgarten.
- Kindergartenförderverein Feilbingert — kindergarten promotional association
  - Founded in 1984
- Kolpingfamilie Feilbingert — Kolping family
  - Founded in 1932, the club’s main goals lie in ecclesiastical, family and social fields. It also stages a Saint Martin's Day parade (11 November) each year. The club also once hosted ten “Chernobyl Children” for four weeks.
- Landfrauen Feilbingert — countrywomen's club
  - Founded in 1995, this is one of Feilbingert’s newest clubs. It offers regular events such as courses, seminars and educational outings. It also holds handicraft evenings, cooking demonstrations, presentations, Easter markets and other events.
- LANZ-Bulldog-Club Nordpfalz e.V.
  - Founded in 1990, this association of enthusiasts for the old Lanz tractors holds a rally every two years commonly attended by some 4,000 visitors. As such it is possibly Feilbingert’s most visible club.
- Männergesangverein 1872 Liederkranz Feilbingert — men's singing club
  - The current club was formed out of a merger of two forerunners, Männergesangverein 1872 and Männergesangverein Liederkranz 1903.
- Musikverein 1920 Feilbingert e.V. — music club
  - Since 1985, the club has borne the nickname Lembergmusikanten, and currently it has more than 200 members.
- Schachclub 1976 Feilbingert — chess club
  - This club is said to be Feilbingert’s most successful “sport” club. There is no other centre as small as Feilbingert in Rhineland-Palatinate that has its own chess club, and one that has played so well at such a high level. In 1995, the club’s first team were champions in the First Rhenish Hesse League and since then it has been playing in the Second Rhineland-Palatinate League.
- Schützenverein Lemberg e.V. — shooting club
  - Founded in 1979, the club has no shooting range that it can call its own, and so the stage at the Lemberghalle is used.
- Sportförderverein Feilbingert e.V. — sport promotional association
  - Founded in 1994, despite its name, the club also promotes traditional customs including Fastnacht as well as sport. It also acts as the sport club's fundraiser, especially for its youth programmes.
- Sportverein 1920 e.V. Feilbingert — sport club
  - Founded in 1920 as the Ring- und Fußballverein, the club is now strictly a football club. It is one of Feilbingert's biggest clubs with more than 250 members.
- Stammtisch "Die Liehner" e.V.
  - Founded on 1 August 1974, Feilbingert’s Stammtisch (informal but regular gathering at a public house) is apparently the only one in Germany that is a registered club ("e.V.").
- Tennisgemeinschaft Feilbingert 1981 e.V. — tennis club
  - Began as a breakaway club from the gymnastic club in 1988.
- Tischtennisclub Feilbingert — table tennis club
  - Began as a breakaway club from the gymnastic club in 1967.
- Trachtengruppe Feilbingert e.V. — costume club
  - Founded in 1952, the costumes worn by members at the events are historically based. There are adult and child-and-youth dance troupes. They represent Feilbingert at events in other places, such as Speyer’s pretzel festival, the Rheinland-Pfalz-Tag (state festival) and even Oktoberfest in Munich. The club also stages children’s Fastnacht sessions.
- VdK-Ortsgruppe Feilbingert — social advocacy group
  - Founded in 1950, the club’s goal is still – despite the great length of time that has passed since the Second World War – to help the war wounded and also widows and orphans.
- Verkehrs- und Verschönerungsverein e.V. — transport and beautification club
  - Refounded in 1992, this club’s main goal is to open Feilbingert up to tourism, undertaking such projects as building hiking trails and publishing travel literature.
- Wochenend-Siedlergemeinschaft Lüßerttal e.V. — weekenders’ club
  - Founded in 1969 to represent weekenders’ interests, the club works to further growth at the weekender settlement that sprang up in the Lüßerttal in the 1950s. Borne in mind, too, is the intention to seek even closer and more lasting ties to village events.

=== Sport and leisure ===
Since 2006, there has been a panorama path around Feilbingert.

== Economy and infrastructure ==
=== Winegrowing ===
Feilbingert belongs to the “Nahetal Winegrowing Area” within the Nahe wine region. In business in the village are three winegrowing operations, and the area of vineyard planted is 20 ha. Some 71% of the wine grown here (as at 2007) is white wine varieties. In 1979, there were still 46 winegrowing operations, and the vineyard area, at 53 ha, was more than twice what it is now.

=== Transport ===
Running through Altenbamberg less than 2 km to Feilbingert’s east is Bundesstraße 48, which leads to both Bad Münster am Stein-Ebernburg and Bad Kreuznach. Running through Feilbingert itself is Landesstraße 379. This joins Bundesstraße 48 in Bad Münster am Stein-Ebernburg. Serving nearby Altenbamberg is a railway station on the Alsenz Valley Railway (Alsenztalbahn).
