= Niedermoschel =

- Municipality
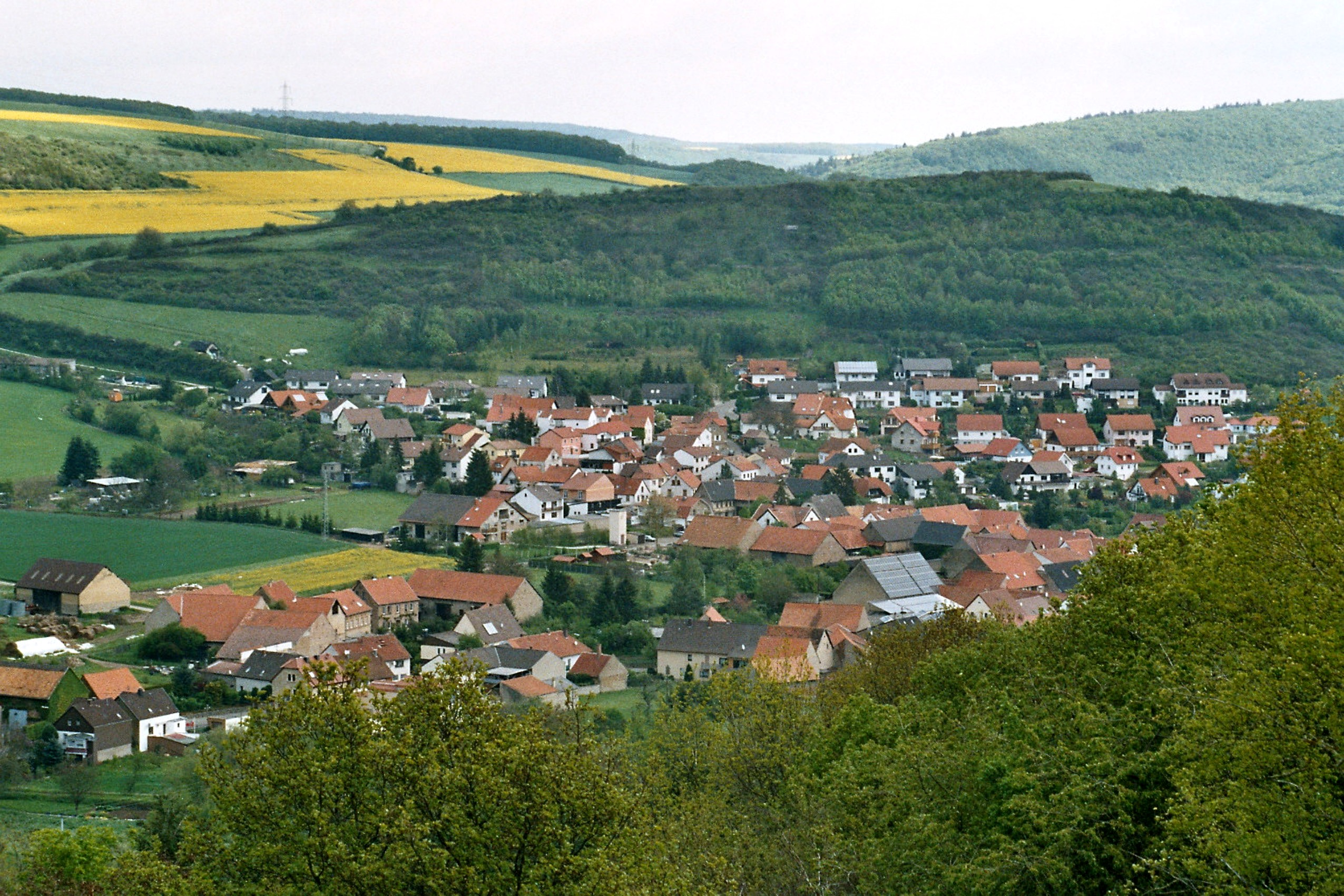
- Niedermoschel as seen from Moschellandsburg castle

- Coat of arms

- Location of Niedermoschel within Donnersbergkreis district
- Interactive map of Niedermoschel
- Location within Germany Location within Rhineland-Palatinate
- Coordinates: 49°44′06″N 7°47′45″E
- Country: Germany
- State: Rhineland-Palatinate
- District: Donnersbergkreis
- Municipal assoc.: Nordpfälzer Land

Government
  - Mayor (2019–24): Gunther Keller

Area
  - Total: 6.61 km^{2} (2.55 sq mi)
- Elevation: 156 m (512 ft)

Population (2025-12-31)
  - Total: 497
  - Density: 75.2/km^{2} (195/sq mi)
- Time zone: UTC+01:00 (CET)
  - Summer (DST): UTC+02:00 (CEST)
- Postal codes: 67822
- Dialling codes: 06362
- Vehicle registration: KIB
- Website: www.niedermoschel.de

Niedermoschel (German pronunciation: [ˈniːdɐˌmɔʃl̩], lit. 'Lower Moschel', in contrast to "Upper Moschel") is a municipality in the Donnersbergkreis district, in Rhineland-Palatinate, Germany.

== Geography ==
The village is located in the North Palatine Uplands, north of the Palatine Forest.

Neighbouring municipalities are Obermoschel, Hallgarten (Pfalz), Alsenz and Sitters.
