= Lemberg (Nahe) =

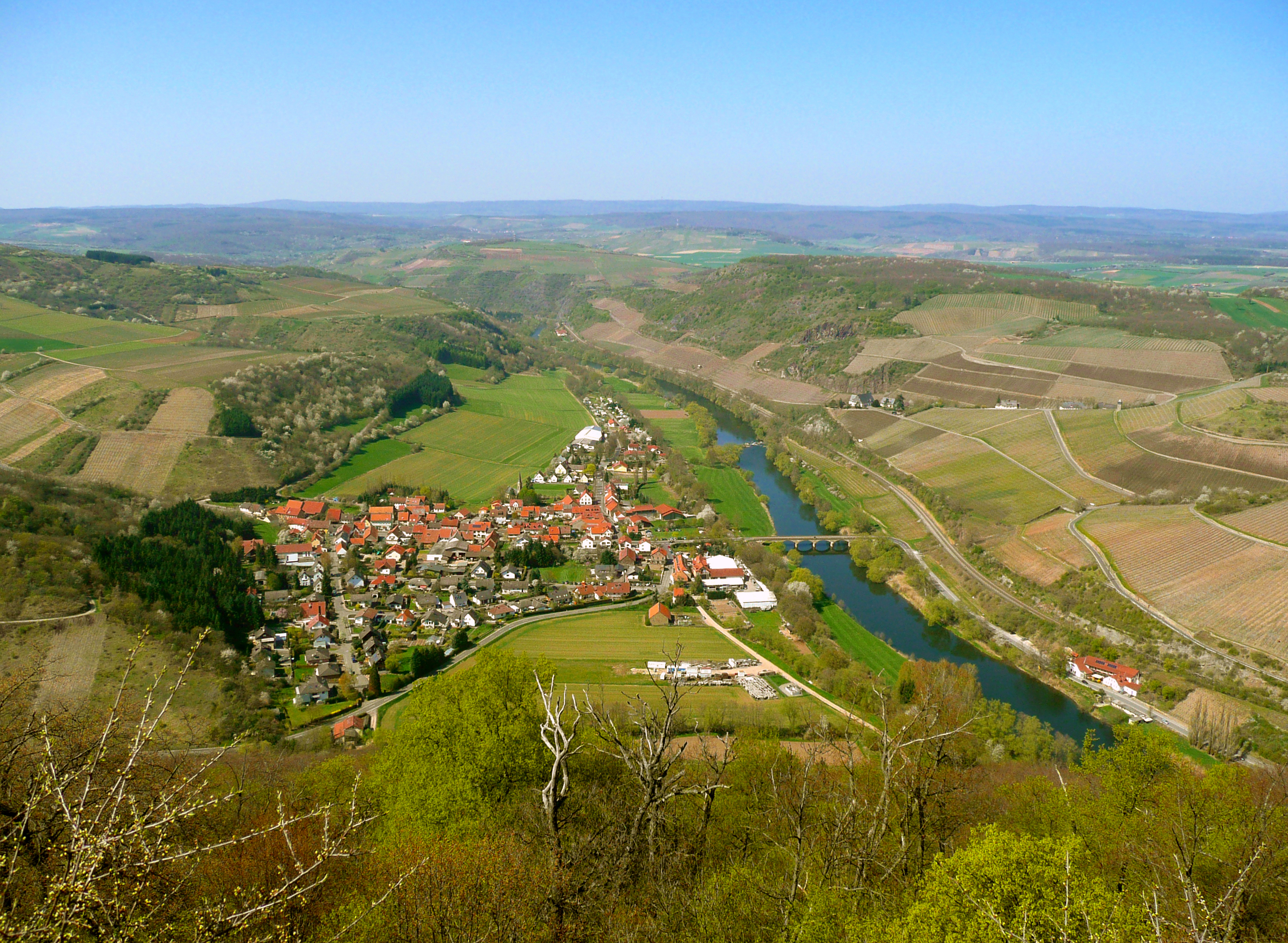
- View of the River Nahe from the Lemberg

Highest point
- Elevation: 421 m above sea level (NN) (1,381 ft)
- Coordinates: 49°46′54″N 7°46′04″E

Geography
- Location within Rhineland-Palatinate
- Location: Rhineland-Palatinate, Germany

The Lemberg is a hill on the river Nahe between the villages of Niederhausen (Nahe), Oberhausen an der Nahe and Feilbingert. At 422 metres, it is the highest hill on the Nahe.

Linguistic researchers believe the derivation of the name Lemberg is Lindberg ("lime hill") and local poets call it the "King of the Nahegau" (König des Nahegaus). The magmatic rock, porphyry, which is found here points to its volcanic origin.
