= Hochstätten =

- Municipality
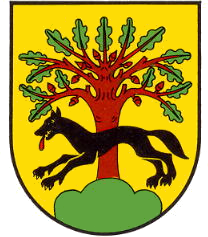
- Coat of arms

- Location of Hochstätten within Bad Kreuznach district
- Interactive map of Hochstätten
- Location within Germany Location within Rhineland-Palatinate
- Coordinates: 49°45′57″N 7°49′57″E
- Country: Germany
- State: Rhineland-Palatinate
- District: Bad Kreuznach
- Municipal assoc.: Bad Kreuznach

Government
  - Mayor (2019–24): Hermann Spieß

Area
  - Total: 5.46 km^{2} (2.11 sq mi)
- Elevation: 138 m (453 ft)

Population (2025-12-31)
  - Total: 645
  - Density: 118/km^{2} (306/sq mi)
- Time zone: UTC+01:00 (CET)
  - Summer (DST): UTC+02:00 (CEST)
- Postal codes: 55585
- Dialling codes: 06362
- Vehicle registration: KH
- Website: www.hochstaetten-pfalz.de

Hochstätten (German pronunciation: [hoːxˈʃtɛtn̩]) is an Ortsgemeinde – a municipality belonging to a Verbandsgemeinde, a kind of collective municipality – in the Bad Kreuznach district in Rhineland-Palatinate, Germany. It belongs to the Verbandsgemeinde of Bad Kreuznach, the seat of which is in the like-named town. Hochstätten is a winegrowing village. The municipality also markets itself as a recreational destination with the self-given nickname das Tor zur Pfalz im Erholungsgebiet Rheingrafenstein ("the gateway to the Palatinate in the Rheingrafenstein Recreational Area").

== Geography ==
=== Location ===
Hochstätten lies in the Alsenz valley on the German Avenue Road. Being a winegrowing village, it is surrounded by vineyards. Hochstätten's elevation is 140 m above sea level.

=== Neighbouring municipalities ===
Clockwise from the north, Hochstätten's neighbours are the municipalities of Altenbamberg, Fürfeld, Winterborn, Alsenz (these last two lying in the neighbouring Donnersbergkreis), Hallgarten and Feilbingert.

=== Constituent communities ===
Also belonging to Hochstätten is the outlying hamlet of Im Steinbruch.

== History ==
Many dates are given as Hochstätten's first documentary mention. An often-cited date is 1108, the date of a document issued by the Archbishopric of Mainz to Disibodenberg Abbey, which names "Hosteden". Somewhat more certain mentions of Hochstätten date from 1260, 1350 and 1366. It is likely that Hochstätten had its own parish by 1261. The church tower, an icon of the village's appearance today, was built in the 13th century. This church has been put under monumental protection. Very early, Hochstätten came under the lordship of the Raugraves and Rhinegraves, who were based at Rheingrafenstein Castle, and later at Gaugrehweiler. Beginning in 1754 or 1755, Hochstätten belonged to Palatine Zweibrücken before passing to the Electoral Palatinate in 1768. In 1801, after French Revolutionary troops had overrun and occupied the German lands on the Rhine's left bank, Hochstätten, along with all the lands that the French had occupied, was absorbed into the French state. Hochstätten was grouped into the Department of Mont-Tonnerre (or Donnersberg in German). After Napoleon's defeat in the German campaign, the last and decisive phase of the War of the Sixth Coalition and indeed of the Napoleonic Wars, the Congress of Vienna placed Hochstätten in the Kingdom of Bavaria in 1816. The village remained in Bavaria until during the Allied occupation after the Second World War, the state of Rhineland-Palatinate was founded. Bearing witness to Hochstätten's history as part of Bavaria, the Bavarian state arms can still be seen today above the stage at the municipal hall, and even the favourite card game at the local Stammtische (regulars' tables) is still one that Germans commonly associate with Bavaria – Schafkopf. In the course of administrative restructuring in Rhineland-Palatinate, Hochstätten was transferred from the old Rockenhausen district (which was dissolved) to the Bad Kreuznach district in 1969.

=== Population development ===
Hochstätten's population development since Napoleonic times is shown in the table below. The figures for the years from 1871 to 1987 are drawn from census data:

Year	Inhabitants
1815	302
1835	511
1871	625
1905	730
1939	629

Year	Inhabitants
1950	706
1961	705
1970	723
1987	665
2005	625

== Religion ==
Ecclesiastically, Hochstätten belongs, as it long has, to the Evangelical Church of the Palatinate and the Roman Catholic Diocese of Speyer. As at 30 September 2013, there are 634 full-time residents in Hochstätten, and of those, 395 are evangelical (62%), 101 are Catholic (16%), 19 belong to other religious groups and 119 either have no religion or will not reveal their religious affiliation.

== Municipal council ==
The municipal council is made up of 12 members, elected by majority vote, with the honorary mayor as chairman. The mayor is Hermann Spieß.

== Coat of arms ==
The municipality's arms might be blazoned as follows: or, in base a trimount vert issuant from which an oak tree leafed of fifteen and fructed of ten, all proper, surmounting the trunk a wolf courant sable langued gules.

The arms were inspired by an old seal, apparently the only one relating to Hochstätten, and it is not known what the charges stand for or where they came from. The arms do not contain the Wheel of Mainz, the Raugravial division of the field ("party per pale") or any of the many elements marshalled in Palatine Zweibrücken's or the Electoral Palatinate's arms, nor is any charge readily identifiable as French or Bavarian. The arms therefore do not seem to relate to the village's territorial history, unlike many civic coats of arms in Germany. The German words for the charges (Eiche – oak tree; Baum – tree; Blatt – leaf; Eichel – acorn; Wolf – wolf; Dreiberg – trimount) do not resemble the name Hochstätten in any way, so the arms would not seem to be canting, which is also common in German civic heraldry. The arms have been borne since 22 October 1981.

== Railway namesake ==
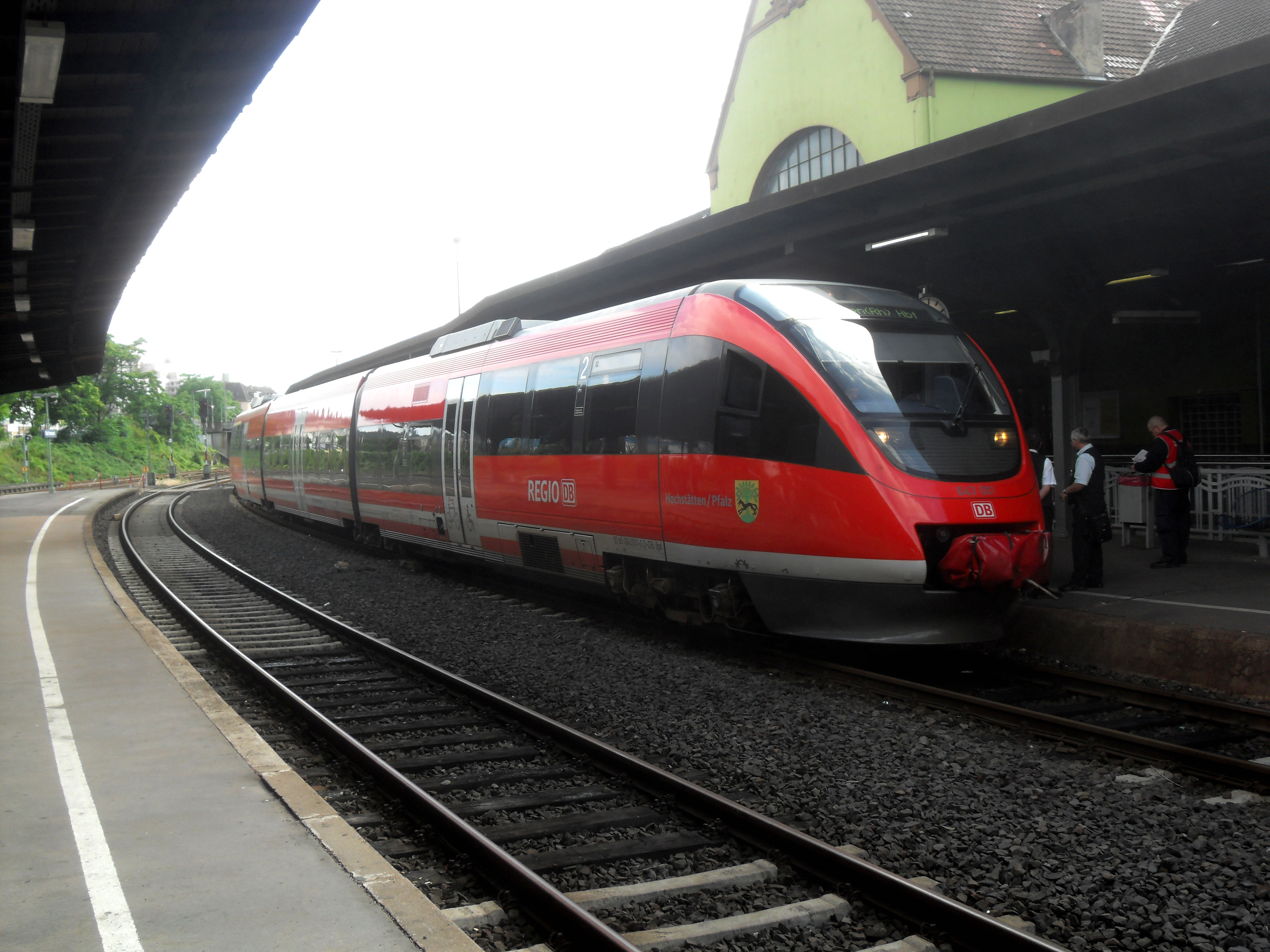
Bombardier Talent Hochstätten/Pfalz at Bad Kreuznach station on its way to Bingen (Rhein) Hauptbahnhof

Hochstätten is also the name of a Deutsche Bahn Bombardier Talent trainset (643 001).

== Culture and sightseeing ==
=== Buildings ===
The following are listed buildings or sites in Rhineland-Palatinate's Directory of Cultural Monuments:

- Protestant church, Hauptstraße – Late Baroque aisleless church, 1772, Gothic former quire tower
- Friedhofstraße – two-arch bridge across the Alsenz and the (now filled-in) millrace, sandstone, earlier half to middle of the 19th century
- Hauptstraße – bridge across the Alsenz, two arches, sandstone-block, marked 1880
- Hauptstraße 14 – house, partly timber-frame, essentially from about 1600, remodelled in the 18th century
- Old Jewish Graveyard, "am Judenkirchhof" (monumental zone) – area with gravestones from the 18th to early 20th century
- New Jewish Graveyard, Am Feilerpfad (monumental zone) – area laid out within the Christian graveyard, recorded 1912–1935

=== Jewish graveyards ===
The first Jewish graveyard was laid out in the early 19th century. By the middle of that century, it was already filled with graves, and the Jewish community applied to expand it. This application was approved, and then implemented about 1880. It may have been expanded once again. The graveyard's area is 740 m^{2} and 19 gravestones are still preserved. Datable stones come from 1873 to 1924. In 1912, another Jewish graveyard, adjacent to the Christian graveyard, without any delimitation, was laid out on the outer, right-hand side of the Christian graveyard. The last burial in the Jewish graveyard was in 1935 (Fanny Kahn née Strauss, died on 13 November 1935). Preserved here are twelve graves with seven readable gravestones. During the Third Reich, the graveyards were not destroyed. The old graveyard lies west of the village in the forest, in the cadastral area "Am Judenkirchhof", lot 1628, while the new graveyard lies north of the village within the Christian graveyard, in the cadastral area "Am Feilerpfad", lot 1248.

=== Clubs ===
Currently active in Hergenfeld are the following clubs:

- Fussball- und Sportverein — football and sport club
- Gesangverein (Männerchor "Germania") — singing club (men's choir) with:
  - Music department
  - Theatre department
- Anglersportverein — angling club
- Verkehrs- und Dorfverschönerungsverein — transport and village beautification club
- Förderverein Freunde der Feuerwehr — "Friends of the Fire Brigade" promotional association
- Krankenpflegeverein — nursing association

=== Wines ===
Hochstätten is known for its winegrowing. Once precious locations have had to be given up because the steep slopes had become ever more troublesome to work, and thus unprofitable. The vines on the southern slopes, on soil that is in part slaty, produce good wine, known far beyond the borders of the Nahegau as Hochstätter Liebesbrunnen. Today, about 32 ha (80 acres) of vineyards are worked. Hochstätten was home to Ilse Theobald, German Wine Queen "Ilse I" in 1966–67, and also to Barbara Laubenstein, the Nahe Wine Queen "Barbara I" in 1984–85. Sandra Laubenstein shared this honour in 1996–97.

== Economy and infrastructure ==
=== Public institutions ===
Hochstätten has at its disposal the only municipal library in the Verbandsgemeinde of Bad Münster am Stein-Ebernburg. In 1983, when the municipal library, then housed in two trunks, was woken out of its long slumber, there were 580 books. Since then, the offering has grown markedly, and so has the number of readers. The library currently has 3,493 books and audiobooks, DVDs and CD-ROMs. Hochstätten also has a village community centre.

=== Transport ===
Running through Hochstätten is Bundesstraße 48, which leads to Bundesstraße 420. Within the village itself is a railway station on the Alsenz Valley Railway (Alsenztalbahn).
