= Niederhausen =

- Municipality
- Coat of arms

- Location of Niederhausen within Bad Kreuznach district
- Interactive map of Niederhausen
- Location within Germany Location within Rhineland-Palatinate
- Coordinates: 49°44′52″N 7°53′43″E
- Country: Germany
- State: Rhineland-Palatinate
- District: Bad Kreuznach
- Municipal assoc.: Rüdesheim

Government
  - Mayor (2019–24): Christine Mathern

Area
  - Total: 5.31 km^{2} (2.05 sq mi)
- Elevation: 191 m (627 ft)

Population (2025-12-31)
  - Total: 597
  - Density: 112/km^{2} (291/sq mi)
- Time zone: UTC+01:00 (CET)
  - Summer (DST): UTC+02:00 (CEST)
- Postal codes: 55585
- Dialling codes: 06758
- Vehicle registration: KH
- Website: www.niederhausen-nahe.de

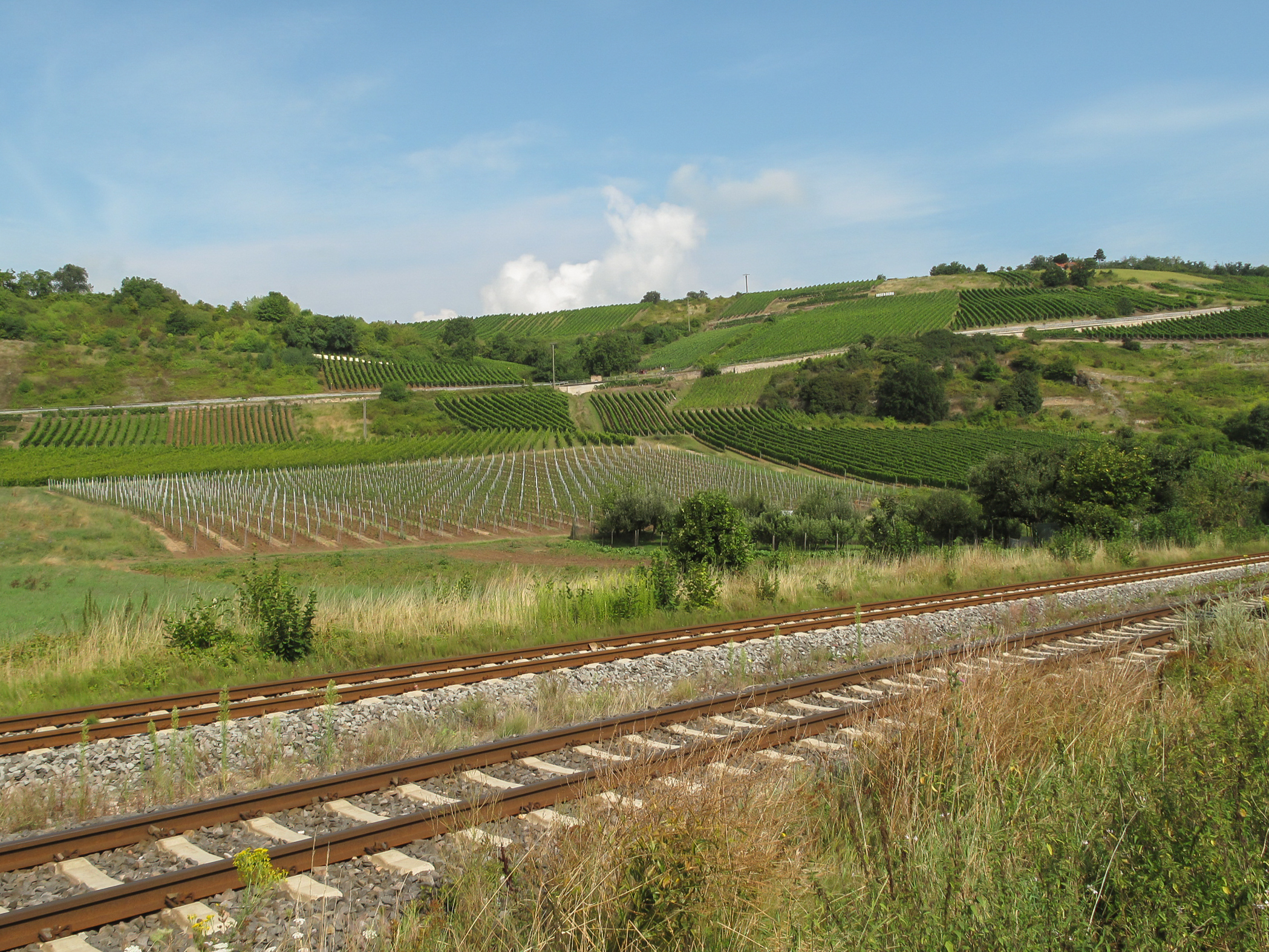
Near Niederhausen, panorama

Niederhausen is an Ortsgemeinde – a municipality belonging to a Verbandsgemeinde, a kind of collective municipality – in the Bad Kreuznach district in Rhineland-Palatinate, Germany. It belongs to the Verbandsgemeinde of Rüdesheim, whose seat is in the like-named town. Niederhausen is a state-recognized tourism community (Fremdenverkehrsort) and a winegrowing village.

== Geography ==
=== Location ===
At an elevation of 150 m above sea level, Niederhausen lies on the Nahe where it marks the division between the outlying edge of the Hunsrück and the North Palatine Uplands. The village lies on a south-facing slope on a reach of the river that is dammed up and consequently 120 m wide.

=== Neighbouring municipalities ===
Clockwise from the north, Niederhausen's neighbours are the municipalities of Hüffelsheim and Norheim, the town of Bad Münster am Stein-Ebernburg and the municipalities of Feilbingert, Oberhausen an der Nahe and Schloßböckelheim, all of which likewise lie within the Bad Kreuznach district.

=== Constituent communities ===
Also belonging to Niederhausen are the outlying homesteads of Hermannshöhle and Ehemalige Weinbaudomäne ("Former Winegrowing Domain").

== History ==
In 1238, Niederhausen had its first documentary mention. It is, however, certain that this place was already settled by Roman times (about AD 200), bearing witness to which are various archaeological finds. Niederhausen belonged as an Electoral Mainz fief to the Counts of Veldenz, and the first documentary mention renders its name Unters Husen. The last of the Counts of Veldenz, namely Friedrich III, died in 1444. His daughter Anna married King Ruprecht's son Count Palatine Stephan. By uniting his own Palatine holdings with the now otherwise heirless County of Veldenz – his wife had inherited the county upon her father's death in 1444, but not his comital title – and by redeeming the hitherto pledged County of Zweibrücken, Stephan founded a new County Palatine, as whose comital residence he chose the town of Zweibrücken: the County Palatine of Zweibrücken, later Duchy Palatinate-Zweibrücken. Beginning then, the village belonged to this state, and in 1768 it passed by partition to Electoral Palatinate. Niederhausen thus long belonged to states ruled by the House of Wittelsbach. In the time of the French Revolution, the village was absorbed, along with all the German lands on the Rhine's left bank, into the French state. Niederhausen lay in the new Canton of Kreuznach, the Arrondissement of Simmern and the Department of Rhin-et-Moselle. Under the terms of the Congress of Vienna, on 28 May 1815, Niederhausen passed to the Kingdom of Prussia. Borderstones marking the former boundary between this state and the neighbouring Kingdom of Bavaria can still be seen along Niederhausen's southern limit. In the years 1926-1928, the Wasserkraftwerke Niederhausen GmbH built a hydroelectric power station right near the village. The weir, made up of three spans, near the former railway station backs the water up so that it will flow along a 760 m-long channel to the power station. In the course of administrative restructuring in Rhineland-Palatinate, Niederhausen was grouped into the Verbandsgemeinde of Bad Münster am Stein-Ebernburg in 1969. From the Middle Ages right up to about 1880, there was much prospecting around Niederhausen in the volcanic rock for copper and even silver.

=== Population development ===
Niederhausen's population development since Napoleonic times is shown in the table below. The figures for the years from 1871 to 1987 are drawn from census data:

| Year | Inhabitants |
|---|---|
| 1815 | 312 |
| 1835 | 445 |
| 1871 | 433 |
| 1905 | 509 |
| 1939 | 532 |

| Year | Inhabitants |
|---|---|
| 1950 | 594 |
| 1961 | 607 |
| 1970 | 562 |
| 1987 | 605 |
| 2005 | 597 |

== Religion ==
As at 30 November 2013, there are 572 full-time residents in Niederhausen, and of those, 326 are Evangelical (56.993%), 150 are Catholic (26.224%), 1 belongs to the Palatinate State Free Religious Community (0.175%), 10 (1.748%) belong to other religious groups and 85 (14.86%) either have no religion or will not reveal their religious affiliation.

== Politics ==
=== Municipal council ===
The council is made up of 12 council members, who were elected by majority vote at the municipal election held on 7 June 2009, and the honorary mayor as chairman.

=== Mayor ===
Niederhausen's mayor is Christine Mathern.

=== Coat of arms ===
The German blazon reads: Das Wappen zeigt einen blauen Rundschild mit drei goldenen Trauben und goldenen Weinstockblättern, darüber eine goldene Krone.

The municipality's arms might in English heraldic language be described thus: Azure three bunches of grapes each slipped and leafed of one fixed in triangle Or, in chief a crown of the same adorned with rubies.

On 5 October 1950, Niederhausen was granted approval by the Rhineland-Palatinate Minister of the Interior to bear arms. It may well be one of the few coats of arms in Rhineland-Palatinate that so clearly expresses a winegrowing village's character. Moreover, it shows the importance and standing that are accorded the Qualitätswein made here. All this is represented by the main charge, the three bunches of grapes. The other charge, the crown in chief (the uppermost level of the shield) refers not only to the village's former patron saint Mechtildis, whose crown also appeared in the old court seal, but also to the marketing slogan for the Nahe wine region: Nahewein – Ein Edelstein ("Nahe wine – a precious stone"). The connection, however, is lost in the translation. The crown is held to remind one of the Edelstein, as this German word for "precious stone" literally means "noble stone".

== Culture and sightseeing ==
=== Buildings ===
The following are listed buildings or sites in Rhineland-Palatinate's Directory of Cultural Monuments:

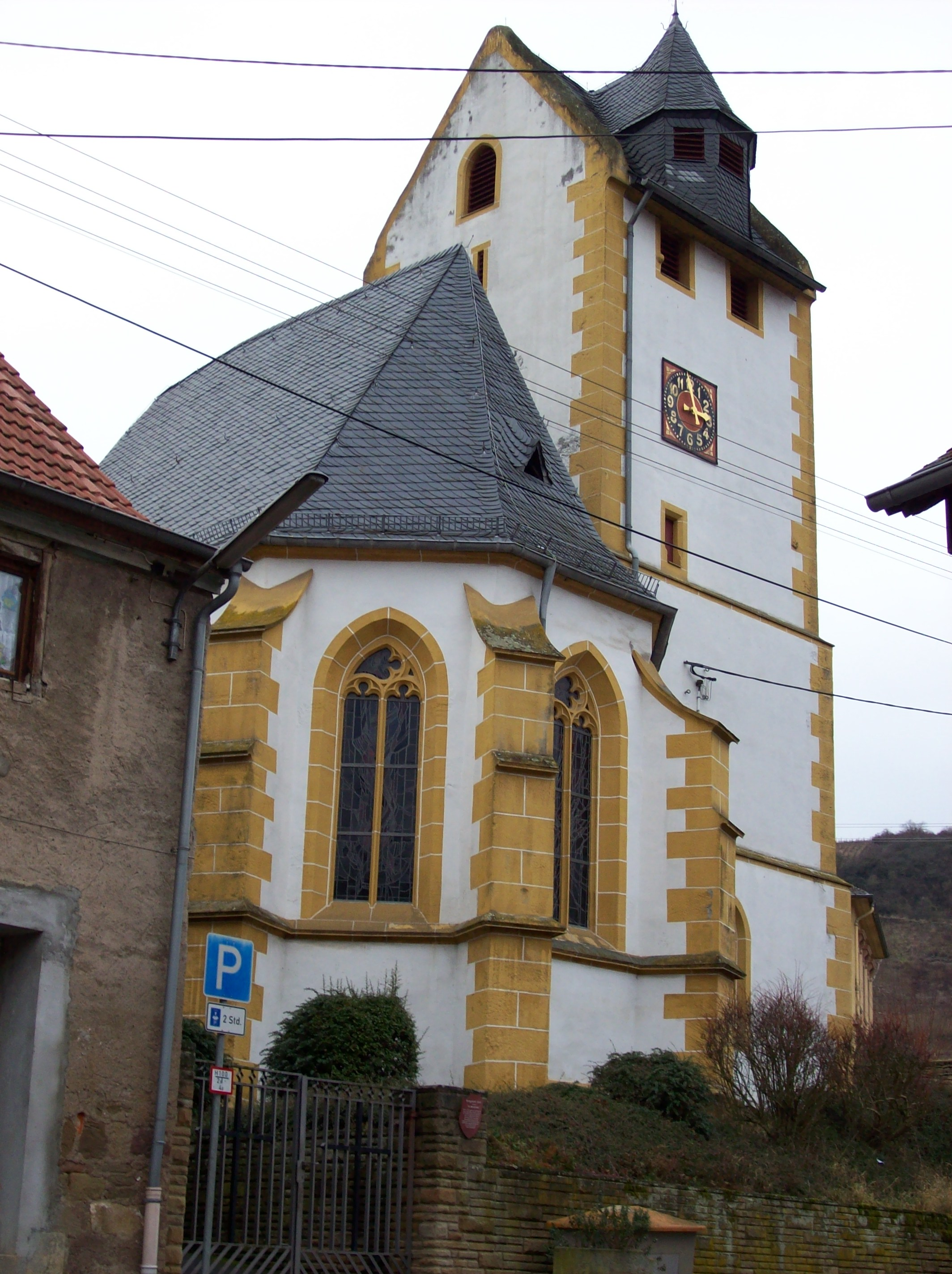
Kirchgasse 9 – Evangelical parish church

- Evangelical parish church, Kirchgasse 9 – formerly Saint Mechtildis's (St. Mechtildis), Romanesque nave, Late Gothic quire, tower altered in the 15th century (see also below)
- Am Stausee – former railway station; about 1900, Late Gründerzeit sandstone-block building, partly slated timber framing, timber-frame goods shed
- Hintergasse 11 – hook-shaped estate; Baroque building with half-hip roof, timber framing plastered, 18th century
- Kirchgasse – warriors' memorial 1914–1918, Muschelkalk cube with relief, 1920s
- Kirchgasse 14 – Evangelical rectory; Late Classicist rectory, last fourth of the 19th century, quarrystone barn, stable door lintel marked 1549
- At Raiffeisenstraße 3 – Late Gründerzeit plastered façade of the Niederthälerhof winery, about 1900
- Winzerstraße 7 – Baroque timber-frame house, partly solid, about 1700
- Former quicksilver mine "Schmittenstollen", in the Niederhäuserwald (forest), southwest of the village – galleries, drifts and shafts, towards 1469-1939 (see also below)
- Former State Winegrowing Domain (now Hermannsberg estate), on Kreisstraße 58, southwest of the village (monumental zone) – former Königlich-Preußische Weinbaudomäne Niederhausen-Schloßböckelheim ("Royal Prussian Winegrowing Domain"); 1902 and years following with winepress house in Art Nouveau with Historicist elements, marked 1910; director's house, workers' dwellings, staff house, substation tower, vineyards; broad visual impression of landscape
- Inn "Hermannshöhle", on Landesstraße 235, southwest of the village – former ferryman's house, essentially Baroque three-winged complex; one-floor building with half-hip roof
- Hydroelectric power station, on the Nahe, partly within Norheim's limits – reservoir with dikes, weir with bridge and four towers, hydroelectric power station with machine hall and machinist's house, 1930s/1950s (see also below)
- Vineyard house – eight-sided plastered building, 19th century
- Vineyard house – half-round tower with Gothic elements, quarrystone, late 19th century

=== More about buildings and sites ===
==== Parish church ====
The parish church with its girding wall and defensive tower comes mainly from the 12th century; the quire is Gothic. It was consecrated to Saint Mechtildis, whose reputed grave here was the object of pilgrimage even into Protestant times, up to about 1575. Indeed, Mechtildis even still appeared in the village's court seal from 1632. Well known are the frescoes in the tower chapel. In 1940, even older, Romanesque, wall paintings were discovered in the nave. These had been whitewashed out on the Meisenheim church administration's orders in 1669. They also had the altars and baptismal font smashed up.

==== Power station ====
The three-span, 75 m-long weir raises the River Nahe's water behind it by roughly 6 m, thereby forming a reservoir some 5 km long. Even today, RWE still runs a hydroelectric power station here, supplied by a 600 m-long headrace. The sod was turned on 20 December 1926, and the power station was brought into service on 18 March 1928. The high dikes on both sides ensure that the village is effectively safe from flooding. This protection has since been reinforced with the addition of a mobile barrier. In the beginning, the reservoir's volume was roughly 900,000 m^{3}, but this has since been markedly reduced over the last few decades by sedimentation. The power station's generating capacity has a maximum of 1,900 kW, generating a yearly average of 5,232 240 kWh. The reservoir's area is roughly 30 ha. This enormous intrusion into the natural environment in the Nahe's water gap, however, has brought about its own microclimate of almost Mediterranean character, which is especially conducive to winegrowing.

==== Schmittenstollen ====
The Lemberg, with an elevation of 420 m above sea level, is the highest peak in the Nahe valley region. It harbours among other mining points of interest a cultural-historical gem: a mediaeval cinnabar mine, the Schmittenstollen, the only mercury mine in Western Europe that has been developed into a visitable mine. The former worship site on the Lemberg that was consecrated to the god Mercury suggests that quicksilver was being mined here even in Roman times. Evidence, though, only exists for mining as far back as the 15th century, with three great periods of working, the last from 1936 to 1942, during which cinnabar was mined. In the gallery that is open to the public, the visitor can make out the sections that were worked in the Late Middle Ages by hammer and pick as well as those that were worked in the 20th century by machine and with explosives. This underground experience gives the visitor a taste of what it was like for generations of miners who worked the cinnabar mine over the centuries. The Schmittenstollen is open from April to October.

=== Sport and leisure ===
The Weinwanderweg ("Wine Hiking Trail") with a total length of about 4.6km has gathered up more than 340 members worldwide, making it the village's biggest club. Many members busy themselves expanding and maintaining this educational path that leads through Niederhausen's various vineyards.

== Economy and infrastructure ==
=== Transport ===
Running through Niederhausen is Landesstraße 235, and it is met in the village centre by Kreisstraße 56. Landesstraße 235 leads to Bundesstraße 48 at Bad Münster am Stein-Ebernburg, which leads to Bad Kreuznach and, after an interchange onto Bundesstraße 41, the Autobahn A 61 (Koblenz–Ludwigshafen) just beyond. Serving neighbouring Norheim is a railway station on the Nahe Valley Railway (Bingen–Saarbrücken). This same line actually likewise runs through Niederhausen, but the station there is no longer served.

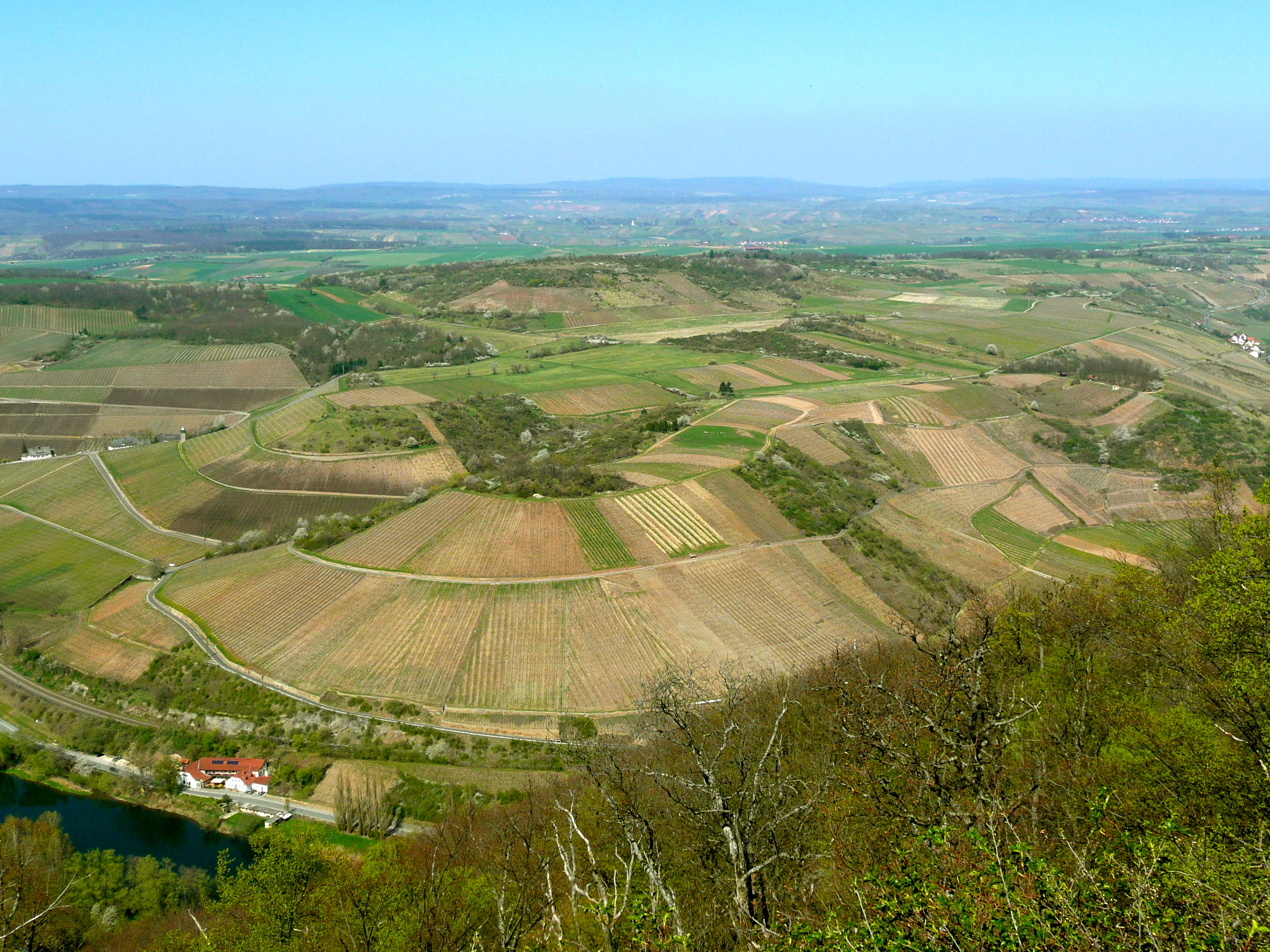
Niederhausen vineyards

=== Winegrowing ===
Niederhausen's structure is characterized mainly by winegrowing. Twelve individual winegrowing locations – Einzellagen – are distributed among roughly 120 ha of vineyards. One of the best known winegrowing operations was the Königlich-Preußische Weinbaudomäne Niederhausen-Schloßböckelheim ("Royal Prussian Winegrowing Domain"). It was already fostering winegrowing in the 19th century, especially against the phylloxera plague introduced from the United States along with the rise in fungal pests. This winegrowing domain gave Nahe wines added strength on the market, having before been sold under other names such as "Rüdesheimer" (referring to Rüdesheim am Rhein rather than Rüdesheim an der Nahe) or "Rhine Wine", having no well known identity of its own. Among Niederhausen's wineries are the following:

- Weingut Daum
- Weingut-Gästehaus Franzmann
- Weingut Lindenhof
- Weingut Mathern
- Weingut Jakob Schneider
