= Oberhausen an der Nahe =

- Municipality
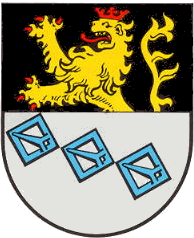
- Coat of arms

- Location of Oberhausen an der Nahe within Bad Kreuznach district
- Interactive map of Oberhausen an der Nahe
- Location within Germany Location within Rhineland-Palatinate
- Coordinates: 49°47′35″N 7°45′30″E
- Country: Germany
- State: Rhineland-Palatinate
- District: Bad Kreuznach
- Municipal assoc.: Rüdesheim

Government
  - Mayor (2019–24): Annelore Kuhn

Area
  - Total: 3.31 km^{2} (1.28 sq mi)
- Elevation: 128 m (420 ft)

Population (2025-12-31)
  - Total: 366
  - Density: 111/km^{2} (286/sq mi)
- Time zone: UTC+01:00 (CET)
  - Summer (DST): UTC+02:00 (CEST)
- Postal codes: 55585
- Dialling codes: 06755
- Vehicle registration: KH
- Website: www.oberhausen-nahe.de

Oberhausen an der Nahe is an Ortsgemeinde – a municipality belonging to a Verbandsgemeinde, a kind of collective municipality – in the Bad Kreuznach district in Rhineland-Palatinate, Germany. It belongs to the Verbandsgemeinde of Rüdesheim, whose seat is in the like-named town. Oberhausen is a winegrowing village. Oberhausen an der Nahe is one of two municipalities in the district with the name Oberhausen. The other is Oberhausen bei Kirn.

== Geography ==
=== Location ===
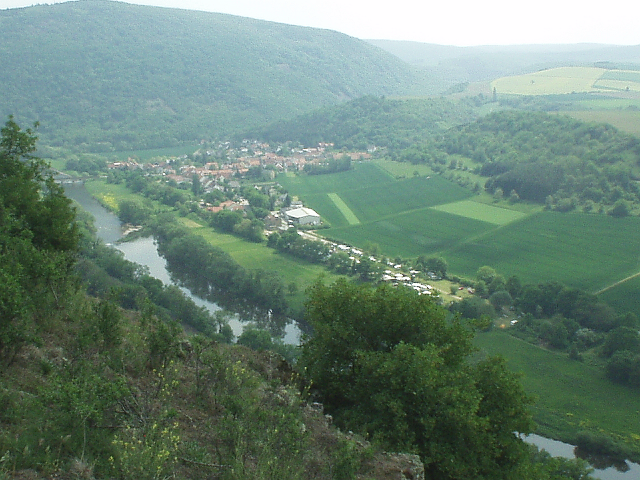
Oberhausen from the northwest

Oberhausen lies on the River Nahe at the foot of the Lemberg, the Middle Nahe's highest hill.

=== Neighbouring municipalities ===
Clockwise from the north, Oberhausen an der Nahe's neighbours are the municipalities of Schloßböckelheim, Niederhausen, Feilbingert, Hallgarten (although this boundary is very short), Duchroth and Waldböckelheim, all of which likewise lie within the Bad Kreuznach district.

== History ==
In 1937, an ancient Roman estate was discovered at the Buchwald (forest). On the Lemberg was a Roman signalling station that relayed messages between camps at Kreuznach and Metz. Oberhausen itself (formerly called Husen) was founded in Merovingian times (5th to 8th centuries) and was within Disibodenberg Abbey's sphere of influence. At the time of the partition of the Nahegau, the village passed in 1200 to the Counts Palatine of Zweibrücken, who enfeoffed the Knights of Montfort with it in 1274. Until 1700, Oberhausen was jointly held by the Houses of Boos zu Waldeck, Blick von Lichtenberg, Albrecht von Günterode and the Dukes of Zweibrücken-Veldenz. From 1789 to 1814, the village, along with all the German lands on the Rhine’s left bank, were ruled by Revolutionary and later Napoleonic France. After the Congress of Vienna, Oberhausen belonged as of 1814 to the Kingdom of Bavaria, and it remained in Bavaria through that state’s transition into a constituent kingdom of the German Empire (1879) and the Free State after the Revolution, in the Weimar Republic (1919) and the Third Reich (1933) until the end of the Second World War (1945), after which it became part of the then newly founded state of Rhineland-Palatinate in 1949, upon the creation of what is now known as the Bonn Republic. In the course of administrative restructuring in Rhineland-Palatinate, Oberhausen was transferred out of the now dissolved Rockenhausen district and into the Bad Kreuznach district. From an ecclesiastical standpoint, Oberhausen still belongs to the Evangelical Church of the Palatinate (Evangelical) and the Roman Catholic Diocese of Speyer.

=== Population development ===
Oberhausen’s population development since the Third Reich is shown in the table below. The figures for the years up to 1987 are drawn from census data:

Year	Inhabitants
1939	348
1950	370
1961	395
1970	364
1987	389
2005	423

== Religion ==
As at 30 November 2013, there are 379 full-time residents in Oberhausen, and of those, 206 are Evangelical (54.354%), 89 are Catholic (23.483%), 2 are Russian Orthodox (0.528%), 10 (2.639%) belong to other religious groups and 72 (18.997%) either have no religion or will not reveal their religious affiliation.

== Politics ==
=== Municipal council ===
The council is made up of 8 council members, who were elected by majority vote at the municipal election held on 7 June 2009, and the honorary mayor as chairman.

=== Mayor ===
The mayor of Oberhausen an der Nahe is Annelore Kuhn, elected in 2019.

=== Coat of arms ===
The German blazon reads: Von Schwarz über Silber geteilt, oben ein rotgekrönter und rotbewehrter, wachsender goldener Löwe, unten drei schrägrechts aneinandergereihte rautenförmige blaue Schnallen.

The municipality's arms might in English heraldic language be described thus: Per fess sable a demilion Or armed, langed and crowned gules and argent three arming buckles conjoined in bend azure.

The charges in the arms are references to the village's past lords and overlords. The lion in the upper field represents Electoral Palatinate while the three buckles in the lower field represent the Lords Boos zu (at) Waldeck.

== Culture and sightseeing ==
=== Buildings ===
The following are listed buildings or sites in Rhineland-Palatinate’s Directory of Cultural Monuments:

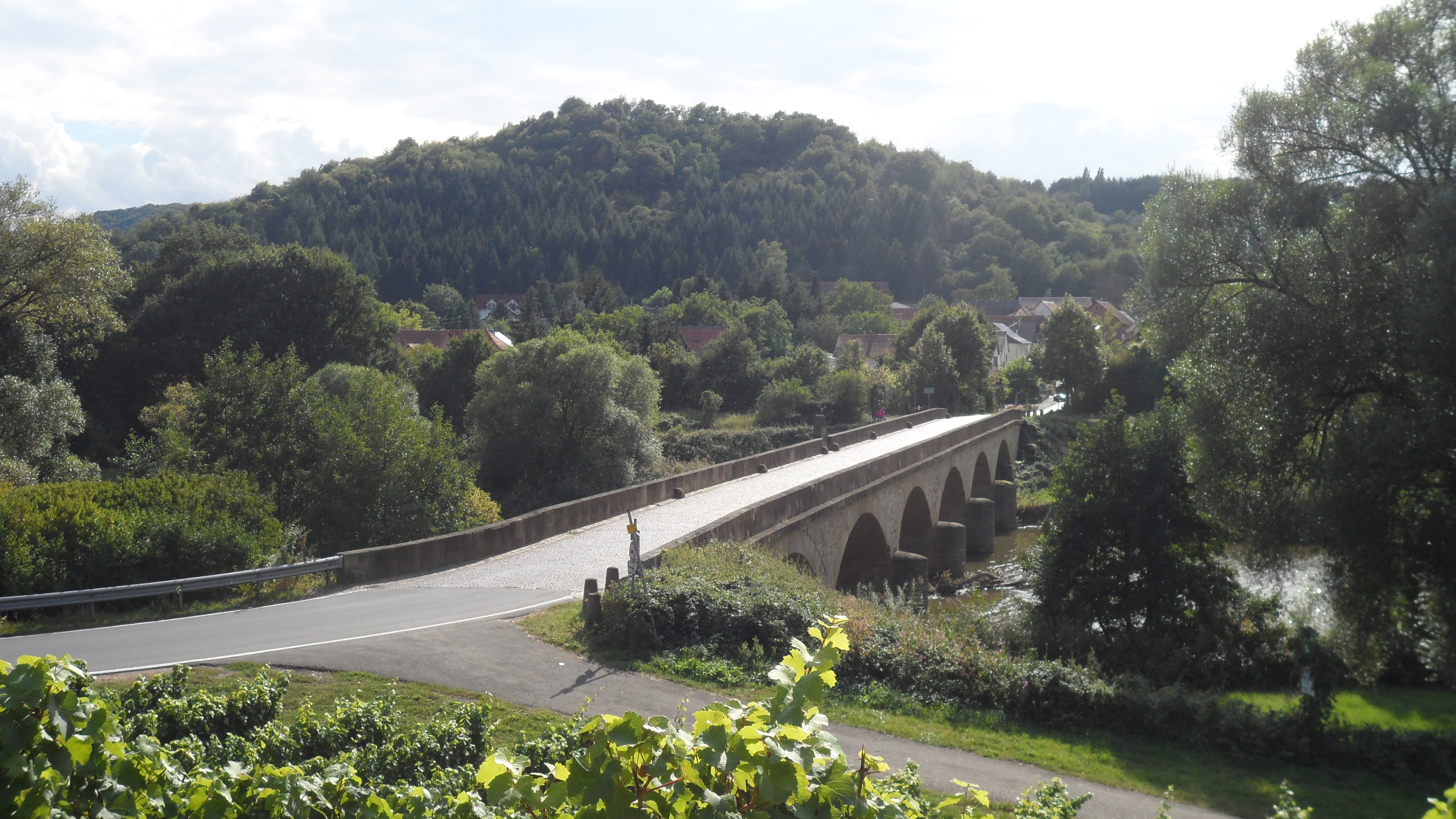
Luitpold-Brücke – six-arch stone bridge across the Nahe (photographed looking towards Oberhausen)

- Protestant church, Kirchgasse 4 – Gothic Revival sandstone-block building, 1865–1868; warriors’ memorial 1914–1918
- Bahnhofstraße, graveyard – graveyard cross, cast-iron, possibly from the latter half of the 19th century
- Hallgartener Straße 3 – former Mühle Bollenbach (mill); three-sided estate; sandstone-block building, marked 1866
- Hallgartener Straße 5 – former Mühle Stein (mill); long Late Baroque building, partly timber-frame, barn, from the latter half of the 18th century
- Hauptstraße – barn with oven
- Untere Kirchgasse 1 – Baroque timber-frame house, partly solid, marked 1669
- Luitpold-Brücke (bridge), north of the village – six-arch bridge across the Nahe, sandstone-block, 1889, Regional Building Superintendent N. Emrich, Kirchheimbolanden

The Luitpold Bridge's dedication reads:

LVITPOLD-BRV̈CKE
Erbaut unter der Regentschaft
Seiner Koeniglichen Hoheit
Prinz Luitpold von Bayern
ANNO DOMINI
1889

The prince in question – and the bridge's namesake – was Luitpold, Prince Regent of Bavaria, who had become Bavaria's de facto ruler after his (by 1889, late) nephew “Mad” King Ludwig had been removed from power.

=== Clubs ===
The following clubs are active in Oberhausen an der Nahe:

- Aktives Oberhausen
- Angelsportverein — angling club
- Freiwillige Feuerwehr Oberhausen — volunteer fire brigade
- TuS Duchroth Leichtathletik — gymnastic and sport club

=== Winegrowing ===
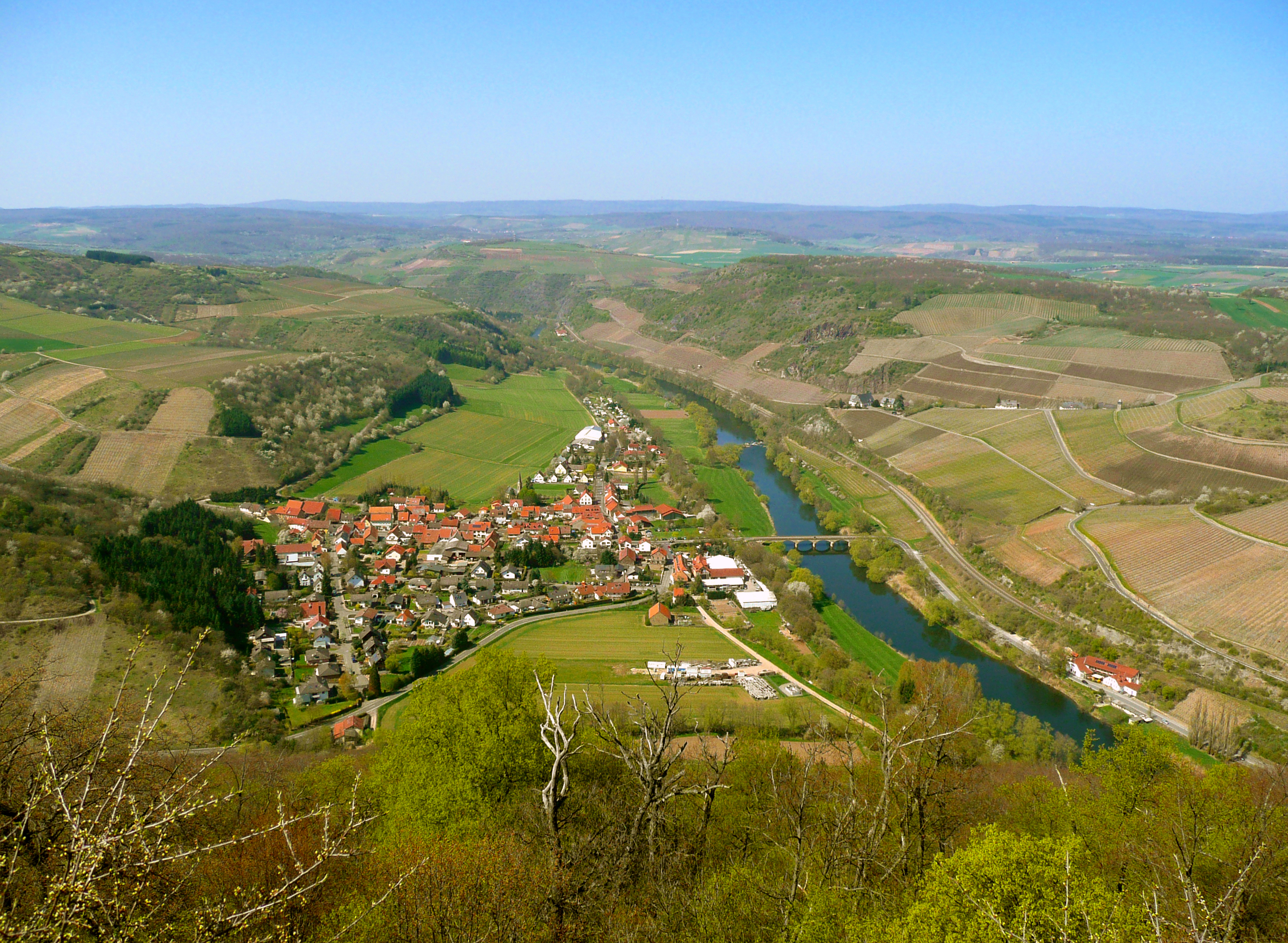
Oberhausen as seen from the Lemberg, looking northwest

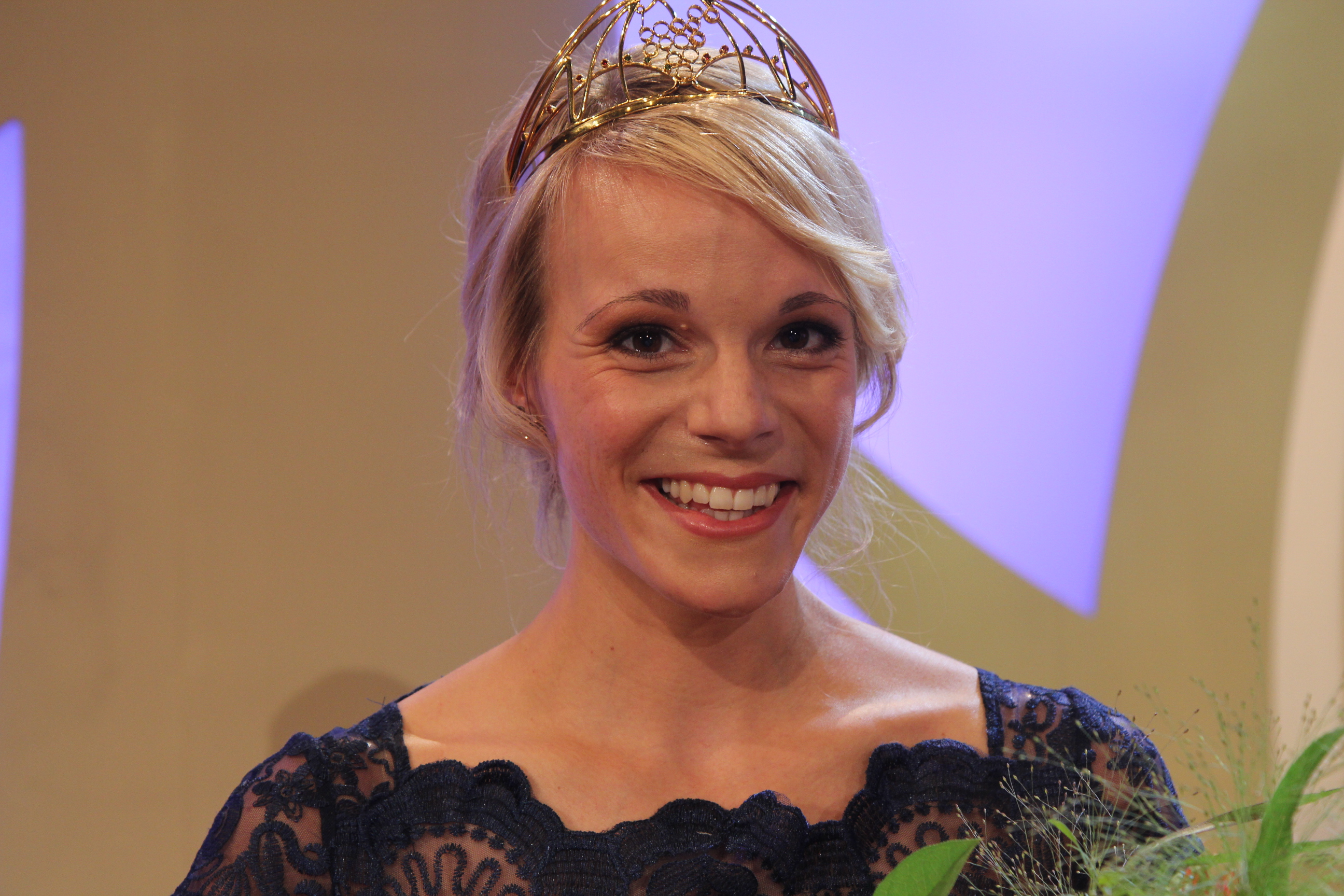
Katharina Staab, German Wine Queen 2017/18

Oberhausen an der Nahe belongs to the Nahetal Winegrowing Area within the Nahe wine region. Eight winegrowing operations are active within the municipality, and the area planted with vineyards is 32 ha. Some 94% of the wine grown here is white wine varieties (as at 2007). In 1979, there were still 13 active winegrowing operations, and the area planted with vineyards was somewhat greater at 44 ha. The following wineries (Weingüter) can be found in Oberhausen an der Nahe:

- Weingut Christmann-Faller
- Weingut Dönnhoff
- Weingut Nessel
- Weingut Rech
- Weingut Staab
- Weingut Stein
- Weingut Weck

The Family Dönnhoff has been making wine in this region since 1750. The 69th German Wine Queen is Katharina Staab from Oberhausen; she was chosen on 29 September 2017 for the period 2017/2018.

=== Transport ===
Running through the village and across the Nahe on the Luitpold-Brücke (bridge) is Landesstraße 235, known within the village as Naheweinstraße, while the stretch beyond the bridge is called Hermannshöhle. Meeting this road in the village centre is Landesstraße 378, known within the village as Hallgartener Straße. Running through neighbouring Waldböckelheim to the northwest is Bundesstraße 41, which leads eastwards to Rüdesheim an der Nahe and the district seat, Bad Kreuznach, and thereafter to the Autobahn A 61 (Koblenz–Ludwigshafen) just beyond. In the other direction, Bundesstraße 41 leads to Bad Sobernheim, Kirn and eventually Idar-Oberstein. Serving nearby Norheim is a railway station on the Nahe Valley Railway (Bingen–Saarbrücken).
