= Hallgarten (Pfalz) =

- Municipality
- Coat of arms

- Location of Hallgarten within Bad Kreuznach district
- Interactive map of Hallgarten
- Location within Germany Location within Rhineland-Palatinate
- Coordinates: 49°45′38″N 7°47′15″E
- Country: Germany
- State: Rhineland-Palatinate
- District: Bad Kreuznach
- Municipal assoc.: Bad Kreuznach

Government
  - Mayor (2019–24): Johann Klein (SPD)

Area
  - Total: 2.54 km^{2} (0.98 sq mi)
- Elevation: 246 m (807 ft)

Population (2025-12-31)
  - Total: 849
  - Density: 334/km^{2} (866/sq mi)
- Time zone: UTC+01:00 (CET)
  - Summer (DST): UTC+02:00 (CEST)
- Postal codes: 67826
- Dialling codes: 06362
- Vehicle registration: KH
- Website: hallgarten-pfalz.de

Hallgarten is an Ortsgemeinde – a municipality belonging to a Verbandsgemeinde, a kind of collective municipality – in the Bad Kreuznach district in Rhineland-Palatinate, Germany. It belongs to the Verbandsgemeinde of Bad Kreuznach, whose seat is in the like-named town. Hallgarten is a state-recognized tourism community.

== Geography ==
=== Location ===
Hallgarten lies in the Rheingrafenstein Recreational Area (Erholungsgebiet) roughly 10 km southwest of the town of Bad Kreuznach and a like distance southeast of the town of Bad Sobernheim. Three kilometres to the northwest looms the Lemberg. Lying around the village, which itself nestles in a hollow, are woodlands and vineyards. Also lying within Hallgarten's limits are the ruins of Montfort Castle, a popular tourist destination.

=== Neighbouring municipalities ===
Clockwise from the north, Hallgarten's neighbours are the municipalities of Feilbingert, Hochstätten, Alsenz and Niedermoschel, the town of Obermoschel, the municipalities of Duchroth and Oberhausen an der Nahe. The third, fourth and fifth places named lie in the neighbouring Donnersbergkreis.

=== Constituent communities ===
Hallgarten's Ortsteile are the main centre, also called Hallgarten, and the outlying centre of Dreiweiherhof. There is also a rural hamlet below the castle ruins called Montforterhof.

== History ==
In 1391, Hallgarten had its first documentary mention as Hargarten. Also belonging to the municipality is Dreiweiherhof, once a farmers’ and day labourers’ settlement that was once an Electoral Palatinate customs post with a brickworks. All that is now left of the brickworks is one stack, a landmark that can be seen quite far away. The Romans, too, left their traces, and from them also comes the name of the Römerstraße (“Roman road”). After an eventful history, Hallgarten passed in 1768 to Electoral Palatinate. In 1798, the municipality was incorporated into the French state, within which it found itself in the Department of Mont-Tonnerre (or Donnersberg in German) until it passed under the terms of the Congress of Vienna to the Kingdom of Bavaria in 1816. After the dissolution of the Rockenhausen district in 1969, Hallgarten was grouped into the Bad Kreuznach district. Today, Hallgarten is a recreational and residential community. The population hovers at about 800 and is growing steadily.

=== Montfort Castle ===
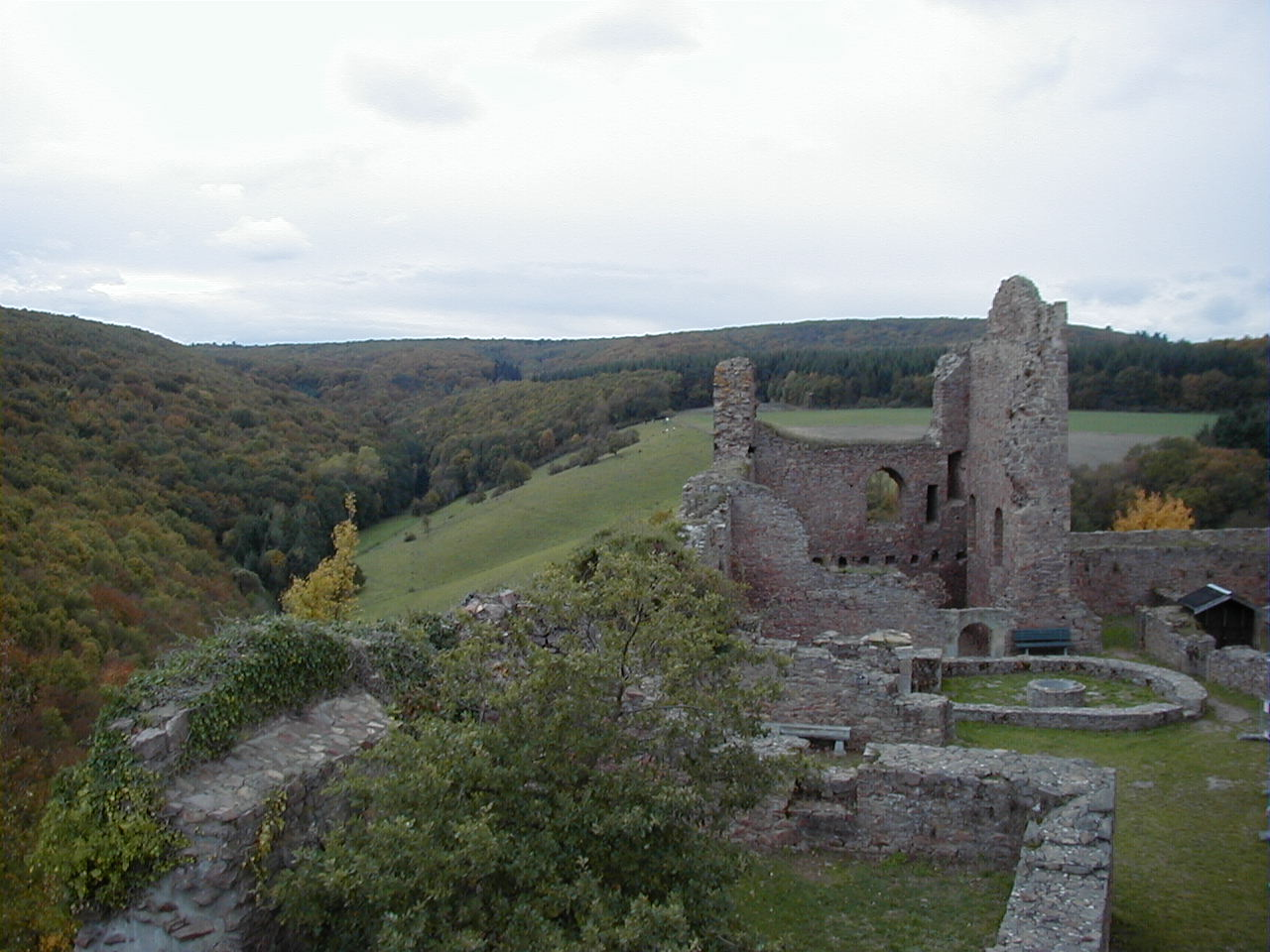
Montfort Castle

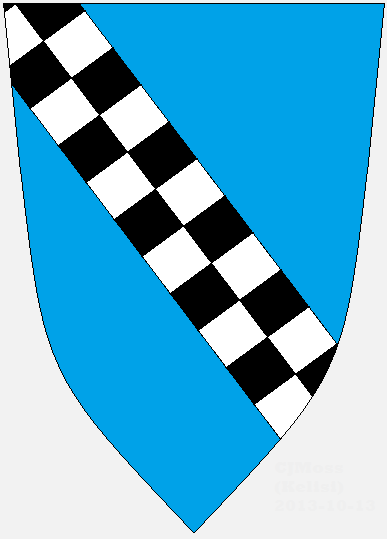
Montfort coat of arms

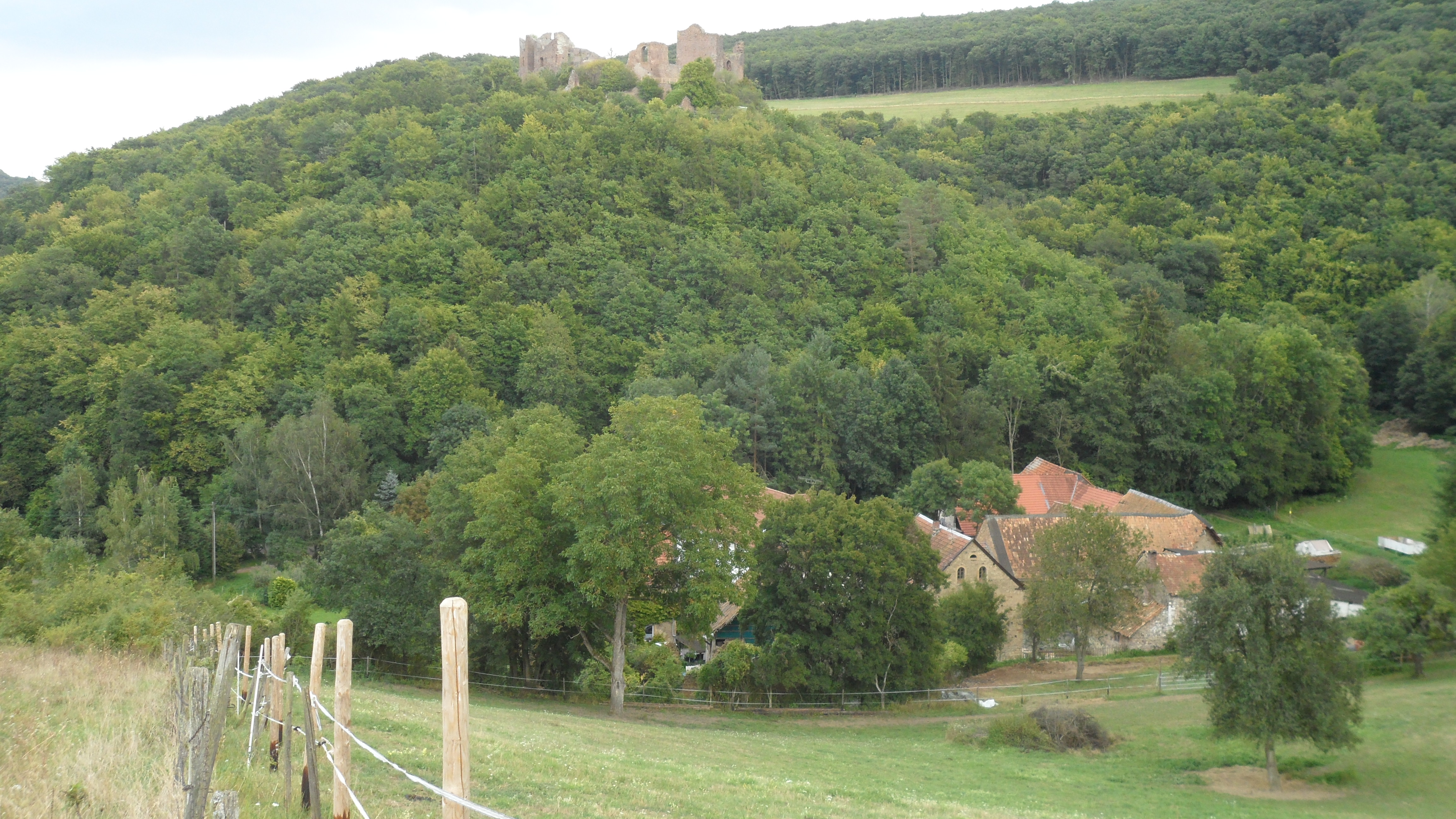
The Montforterhof – the "New Castle", with Montfort Castle up on the hill

Rather a great deal of Hallgarten's mediaeval history has to do with Montfort Castle, a major military stronghold in the local area shared by a number of lordships. The Montfort ruin is among the Palatinate's most impressive castle remnants. Lying today in a secluded woodland away from main highways some 10 km west of Bad Münster am Stein-Ebernburg, the castle was built by the Counts of Veldenz about 1200 to keep watch upon a nearby army road. The origin of the name – which means “strong mountain” (albeit in French, not German) – is uncertain. It could have been brought back by Crusader knights from the Holy Land, where the Teutonic Knights owned a mighty castle, also named "Montfort Castle" (“מבצר מונפור”), which now lies within Israel, and which is also a ruin. The first known, and perhaps also the most important, dweller at the castle was Eberhard von Lautern (1182-1240). He was the father of his line, the Montforts. His son was the first to name himself “Knight of Montfort”. He held important Ämter in the Palatinate, and in 90 centres in the Eastern Palatinate and Rhenish Hesse, he also held great – and small – landholds. The knights were well respected and landed, and it was therefore not really necessary for them to behave as robber knights, as some of their contemporaries felt free to accuse them of doing. As a coat of arms, they bore an escutcheon that could be described as “Azure a bend countercompony sable and argent” (at right). Various knights bore these arms, either undifferenced or with marks of cadency. This noble house died out in 1432. The earliest known document, from 1226, and the next after that make it clear that Montfort Castle was very early on also inhabited by other knightly families, which made it a Ganerbenburg, or jointly held castle. The joint holders (Ganerben) each acquired through marriage or sale a castle house as an hereditary property, somewhat like a modern-day condominium. This afforded considerable personal protection in uncertain times, and for the castle itself, the presence of several defence forces – one kept by each lord – made for a much stronger military presence than was usual for such a stronghold. Joint rulers’ agreements still survive to which as many as 25 parties were signatory (although later in the castle's history, this had shrunk to 17), which would seem to be proof that the castle's population was roughly 150, and thus far greater than that in any of the surrounding villages. Living together in a tightly bordered castle area was regulated by very strict rules, an arrangement known as a Burgfrieden ("castle peace", a term later used in early-20th-century German politics, albeit in a modified sense). This agreement laid down the yearly contributions to the castle's maintenance as well as the kinds and numbers of weapons needed to defend the castle and the food that was needed. The concentrated fighting force of such a great number of knights and their servants was surely what kept Montfort Castle from facing any serious attack or siege, at least as far as history records up to 1456. It took Archbishop of Mainz Diether's and Elector Palatine Friedrich I's vastly superior fighting forces to conquer and destroy the castle on 19 October of that year, with firearms, after a five-day siege. It was, however, more the castle's overlord, Duke Ludwig the Black of Palatinate-Zweibrücken who was “damaged” rather than the castle itself. The only part of that that ever rose again was one of the dwelling towers. One of the joint holders who had been driven out, Sir Boos von Waldeck, built himself the Neues Schloss – "New Castle" – in the dale out of rubble from the destroyed old castle. This laid the groundwork for today's hamlet of Montforter Hof (or Montforterhof). Montfort Castle, such as it now is, represents quite a rare example in Germany of a mediaeval castle, forsaken at the muzzles of cannon, whose 12th-to-15th-century structures are still clearly visible even now, and whose appearance was never altered in later times by modernization or reinforcement against firearms.

=== Dreiweiherhof ===
The Dreiweiherhof served “Schinderhannes” (or Johannes Bückler, to use his real name) as a hideout and base beginning in 1797.

=== Population development ===
Hallgarten's population development since Napoleonic times is shown in the table below. The figures for the years from 1871 to 1987 are drawn from census data:

Year	Inhabitants
1815	399
1835	466
1871	511
1905	606
1939	556

Year	Inhabitants
1950	584
1961	670
1970	786
1987	755
2005	774

== Religion ==
As of 30 September 2013, there were 776 full-time residents in Hallgarten, and of those, 298 were Evangelical (38.402%), 362 were Catholic (46.649%), 2 were Mennonites (0.258%), 6 (0.773%) belonged to other religious groups and 108 (13.918%) either had no religion or would not reveal their religious affiliation.

== Politics ==
=== Municipal council ===
The council is made up of 12 council members, who were elected by proportional representation at the municipal election held on 7 June 2009, and the honorary mayor as chairman. The municipal election held on 7 June 2009 yielded the following results:

	SPD	CDU	FWG	WG Wilhelm	Total
2009	4	4	3	1	12 seats
2004	5	5	2	-	12 seats

=== Mayor ===
Hallgarten's mayor is Johann Klein.

=== Coat of arms ===
The German blazon reads: In Gold die Mutter Gottes mit dem Zepter in ihrer rechten Hand und dem Kind auf dem linken Arm, wachsend über dem dreigeteilten Schild der Kurpfalz, bei dem das untere rote Feld nicht den Reichsapfel enthält, sondern leer und damasziert ist.

The municipality's arms might in English heraldic language be described thus: Or the Mother of God proper crined and crowned of the field, vested gules and mantled azure with a nimbus of the field, in her dexter hand a staff flory of the field, on her sinister arm the child proper crined and with a nimbus of the field, in his sinister hand a bezant, the whole issuant from behind an inescutcheon tierced in mantle, dexter sable a lion rampant sinister Or armed, langued and crowned of the second, sinister paly lozengy argent and azure, in base gules.

The German blazon lays out the charges in far less detail than this, and it could therefore be that the heraldic artist indulged his fancy when executing these arms. The blazon also mentions the lack of a charge in the inescutcheon, namely the globus cruciger that apparently usually stands in the base. It furthermore notes that this field is to be diapered, although the examples in this article and at the municipal website do not show such a thing.

== Culture and sightseeing ==
=== Buildings ===
The following are listed buildings or sites in Rhineland-Palatinate’s Directory of Cultural Monuments:

==== Hallgarten (main centre) ====
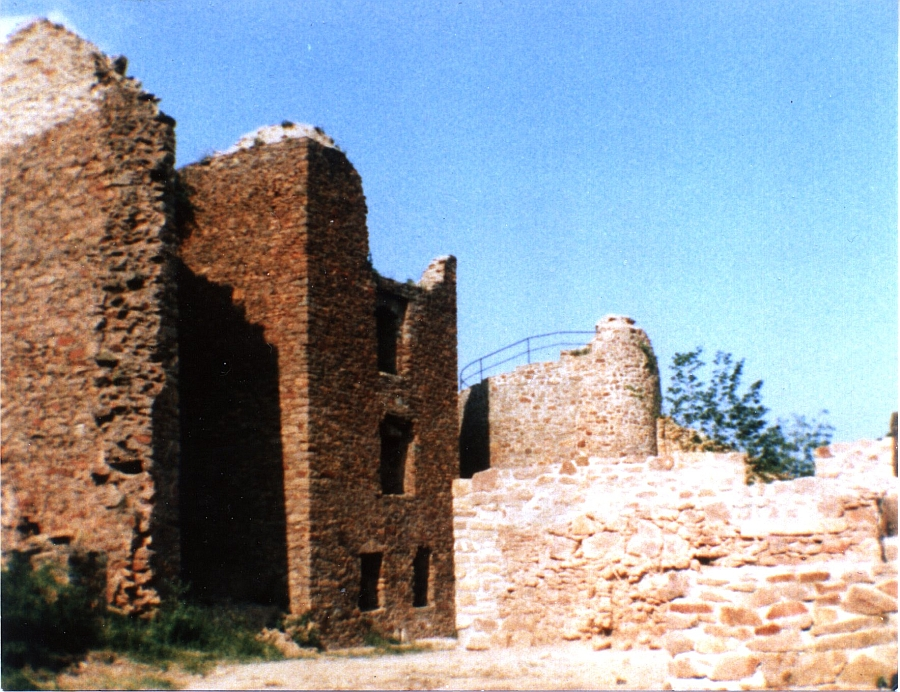
Ruins of Montfort Castle

- Saint Mary’s Catholic Church (Kirche St. Maria), Schulstraße 26 – quire tower church, red sandstone-block building, 1937/1938, architects Albert Boßlet, Landau, and Karl Lochner, Ludwigshafen
- Protestant church, Schöne Aussicht 1 – Romanesque Revival sandstone-block building, 1927, Regional Master Builder Peter Arnold, Rockenhausen
- Hauptstraße 17 – hook-shaped estate; house essentially possibly from about 1600
- Hauptstraße 21 – Quereinhaus (a combination residential and commercial house divided for these two purposes down the middle, perpendicularly to the street), partly timber-frame, about 1800, side building; wayside cross, about 1900
- Schulstraße 25a – former school; with teacher’s dwelling; stately one-and-a-half- to two-floor sandstone-block group of buildings, marked 1901
- Schulstraße, at the Catholic church – warriors’ memorial 1914-1918, sandstone pillar, 1920s
- Montfort Castle ruins – remnants of the concentric castle mentioned in 1226, destroyed in 1456: stump of the keep, remnants of seven towerlike Ganerben (joint lords') houses, cistern, shield wall, inner ward wall, moats only partly preserved, 14th or 15th century

==== Dreiweiherhof ====
- Kreuznacher Straße 5 – three-sided estate, 18th or 19th century; one-floor Late Baroque Einfirsthaus (house with single roof ridge), last fourth of the 18th century
- Kreuznacher Straße 7 – Late Baroque Einfirsthaus, half-hip roof, marked 1780

== Economy and infrastructure ==
=== Transport ===
To Hallgarten's east runs Bundesstraße 48. Serving Bad Münster am Stein-Ebernburg is a railway station on the Nahe Valley Railway (Bingen–Saarbrücken). Furthermore, there is a bus link to Bad Kreuznach.

=== Education ===
Hallgarten has one kindergarten.
