= Duchroth =

- Municipality
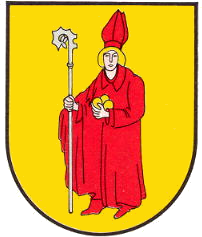
- Coat of arms

- Location of Duchroth within Bad Kreuznach district
- Interactive map of Duchroth
- Location within Germany Location within Rhineland-Palatinate
- Coordinates: 49°47′1″N 7°44′19″E
- Country: Germany
- State: Rhineland-Palatinate
- District: Bad Kreuznach
- Municipal assoc.: Rüdesheim

Government
  - Mayor (2019–24): Jörg Schneiß

Area
  - Total: 9.68 km^{2} (3.74 sq mi)
- Elevation: 247 m (810 ft)

Population (2025-12-31)
  - Total: 550
  - Density: 57/km^{2} (150/sq mi)
- Time zone: UTC+01:00 (CET)
  - Summer (DST): UTC+02:00 (CEST)
- Postal codes: 55585
- Dialling codes: 06755
- Vehicle registration: KH
- Website: www.duchroth.de

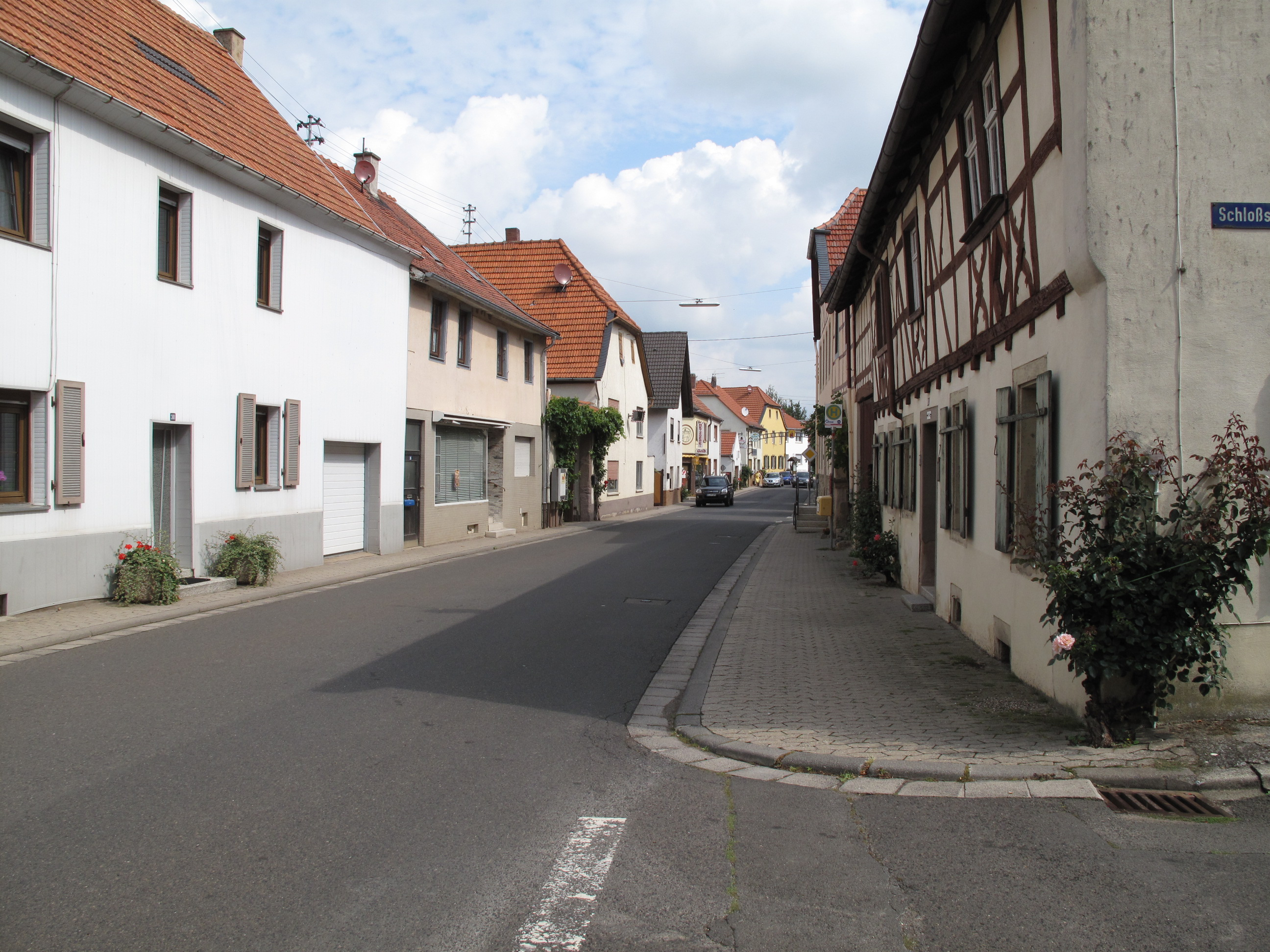
Duchroth, street view

Duchroth (German pronunciation: [ˈduːxʁoːt]) is an Ortsgemeinde – a municipality belonging to a Verbandsgemeinde, a kind of collective municipality – in the Bad Kreuznach district in Rhineland-Palatinate, Germany. It belongs to the Verbandsgemeinde of Rüdesheim, whose seat is in the like-named town. Duchroth is a winegrowing centre and lies in the Soonwald-Nahe Nature Park.

== Geography ==
=== Location ===
Duchroth lies 240 m above sea level in the Rheingrafenstein local recreation area, south of the Hunsrück, between the spa town of Bad Kreuznach and the gemstone town of Idar-Oberstein, not far from neighbouring Odernheim am Glan, where the Glan empties into the Nahe.

=== Neighbouring municipalities ===
Clockwise from the north, Duchroth's neighbours are the municipality of Waldböckelheim, the municipality of Schloßböckelheim, the municipality of Oberhausen an der Nahe, the municipality of Hallgarten, the town of Obermoschel, the municipality of Lettweiler, the municipality of Odernheim am Glan, the municipality of Staudernheim and the municipality of Boos. All lie in the Bad Kreuznach district but Obermoschel, which lies in the neighbouring Donnersbergkreis.

=== Constituent communities ===
Also belonging to Duchroth are the outlying homesteads of Dimrotherhof, Hof Schönblick and Montforterhof.

=== Climate ===
Yearly precipitation in Duchroth amounts to 633 mm, which is rather low, falling into the lowest third of the precipitation chart for all Germany. Only at 27% of the German Weather Service's weather stations are even lower figures recorded. The driest month is February. The most rainfall comes in June. In that month, precipitation is 1.7 times what it is in February. Precipitation varies hardly at all throughout the year. At only 15% of the weather stations are lower seasonal swings recorded.

== History ==
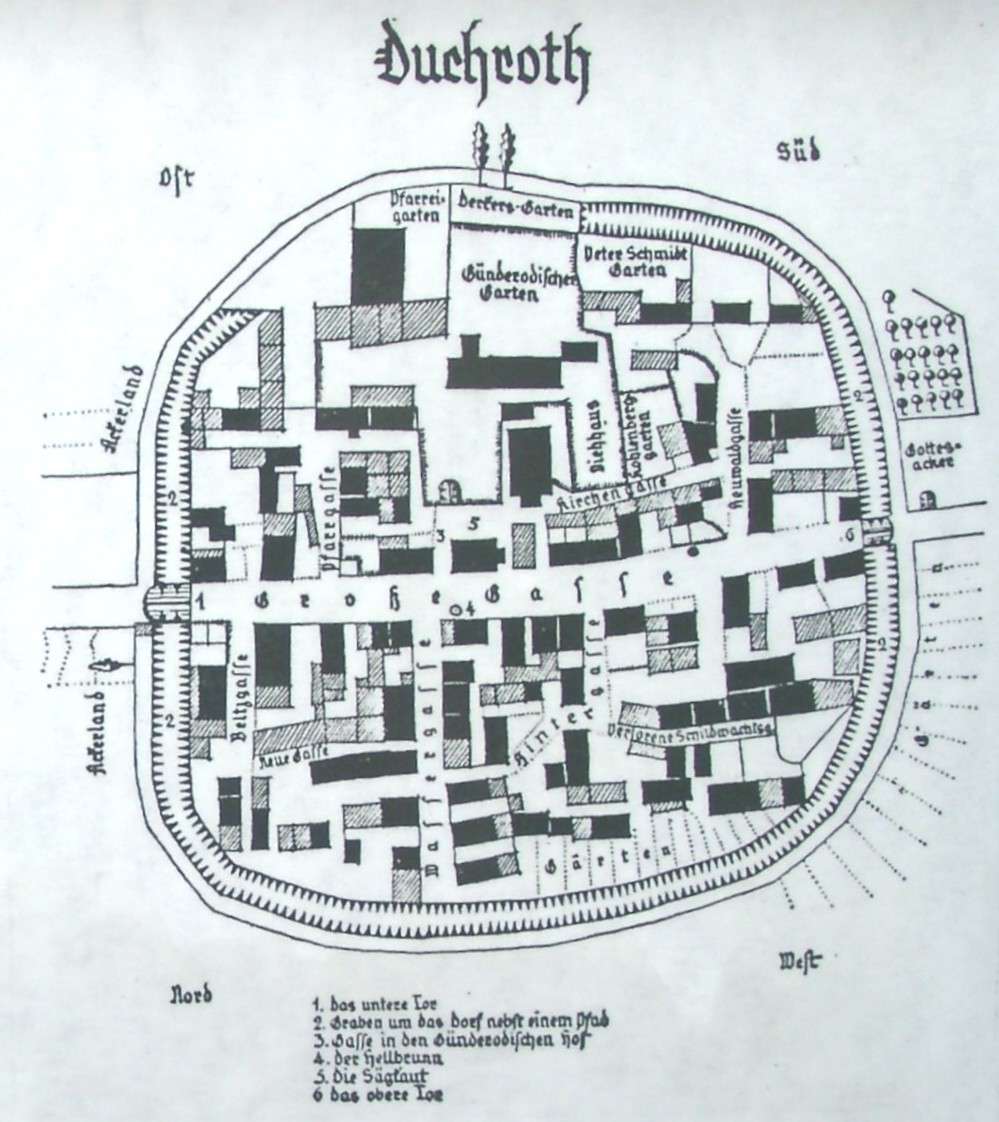
Village map from 1798, drawn by Johann Eimann

From prehistoric times and early history, sporadic archaeological finds have come to light. The Celts built their barrows, while the Romans left the foundations of one of their country estates as well as a graveyard in what is now the vineyard location known as “Feuerberg”. From about 900 to 1100, Duchroth belonged to the Archfoundation of Mainz (Mainzer Erzstift), and thereafter until 1158 to the Counts of Saarbrücken. In 1128, Duchroth had its first documentary mention in a document issued by Archbishop Adalbert I, wherein Duchroth was named as Royde. What is of particular interest about this document is that it deals with the time of Archbishop Willigis’s reign as Archbishop of Mainz, which began in 975. The terms of the document obliged Duchroth to maintain part of Saint Mary’s Chapel on the Disibodenberg. It is thus believed that Duchroth had existed at least since 900. The first time when somebody from Duchroth was mentioned in a document was in 1107 when one of Archbishop Ruthard’s documents mentioned a man named “Wernherus de Royde”. He was some unknown lord's vassal and a ministerialis, and as such loomed up over everybody else in the village. This document is, however, not seen as the village's first documentary mention, even though it is 21 years older than Adalbert's, and “de Royde” is taken only as a description of the man's origins. From 1158 to 1274, Duchroth's inhabitants were subjects of the Counts Palatine of Zweibrücken, and thereafter and until 1394, Duchroth belonged to the Knights of Montfort. Later still, from 1395 to 1410, the village found itself under Elector Palatine Ruprecht III's administration, before it passed to the Dukes of Zweibrücken, under whom it remained until 1779. Duke Stephan of Zweibrücken, Elector Palatine Ruprecht's successor, demanded of his vassals an oath of fealty and loyalty. The Montforts, however – the vassals in question – would have none of it and would not even acknowledge Stephan as their overlord, and nor would they take the oath of homage. Stephan would not tolerate this and advanced with his men from Meisenheim to Duchroth. The Montforts had shut the village gates and had ensconced themselves along with the peasants behind the village moat. The Duchrother Krieg – the Duchroth War – had begun. Since the Elector Palatine had chosen to join in, the Montforts gave in, but not before there had been deaths and other casualties on both sides as well as sacking and fires in the village. Friedrich von Montfort had wisely kept himself out of the fight, and on 9 July 1418, he was installed as Amtmann over Duchroth. In the 16th century, the town hall was built, and it is now one of the oldest in Rhineland-Palatinate. The time from 1618 to 1734 was a time of war – the Thirty Years' War and King Louis XIV's wars of conquest – and its attendant upheaval, including economic hardship. This led to many people from Duchroth choosing emigration as the solution to their woes. Off they went to Russia, America or Southeast Europe (Bačka, Banat). Johann Eimann from Duchroth was a pioneer among settlers and founded Bačka's settlement history. Eimann also drew the 1798 village map that accompanies this article, from memory, after he went to live in Bačka. The village structure shown in his map is to a great extent unchanged today. In the latter half of the 18th century, Duchroth was forced by its overlord, Christian IV, Count Palatine of Zweibrücken, to participate in the lottery for building the Zweibrücken Ducal suburb. It was indeed the village's lot that came up. What was won was a building at Herzogsplatz (“Duke’s Square”). This was sold forthwith and the proceeds were used for a weeklong celebration. From 1779 to 1801, Duchroth belonged to Electoral Palatinate, and from 1801 to 1814, it was under Napoleonic French rule, followed until 1816 by two years of military rule. In that year, under the terms of the Congress of Vienna, Duchroth passed to the Kingdom of Bavaria, which had been awarded a great exclave in the Palatinate. This lasted until 1918 when the kingdom itself met its end when the Kaiser was overthrown and along with him Bavaria's last king. Duchroth belonged to the Free State of Bavaria, however, until after the Second World War, when Bavaria's Palatine exclave was grouped into the then newly founded state of Rhineland-Palatinate. At the time of the Revolutions of 1848, a great many Duchroth inhabitants stood on the freedom fighters’ side. This national movement, which had begun with so much hope, came to a sad end. In Duchroth, the punishment took the form of a company of Bavarian riflemen being billeted in the village. Duchroth men also fought in the Franco-Prussian War (1870-1871), the First World War (1914-1918) and the Second World War (1939-1945). A remembrance to the war dead are the monuments near the church. In 1868 and 1869, a new road was built to Odernheim am Glan so that people would no longer have to take the exhausting path across the “Heath”. One of the worst catastrophes in the village's history was the great fire on Sunday 23 July 1905, in which the church, the rectory, the Schloss and many other buildings burnt down. The new church, built to replace the one destroyed that day, was consecrated on 4 September 1910. In 1947, the state of Rhineland-Palatinate was newly founded, which at first let all administrative bodies stand. In the course of administrative restructuring in 1969, an end was put to the local administrative arrangement that had stood since 1798 on 7 June of that year. The Bürgermeisterei (“Mayoralty”) of Odernheim was dissolved and Duchroth passed to the new Verbandsgemeinde of Bad Münster am Stein-Ebernburg. There was also a change of district, with Duchroth being transferred from the Rockenhausen district (which was itself dissolved) to the Bad Kreuznach district. Ecclesiastically, Duchroth belongs, as it long has, to the Evangelical Church of the Palatinate and the Roman Catholic Diocese of Speyer. In 2012, in the contest Unser Dorf hat Zukunft (“Our village has a future”), Duchroth placed second in the special category at the state level, being outdone only by Kerpen.

=== Population development ===
Duchroth's population development since Napoleonic times is shown in the table below. The figures for the years from 1871 to 1987 are drawn from census data:

| Year | Inhabitants |
|---|---|
| 1815 | 809 |
| 1835 | 1,016 |
| 1871 | 1,138 |
| 1905 | 1,107 |
| 1939 | 671 |

| Year | Inhabitants |
|---|---|
| 1950 | 729 |
| 1961 | 671 |
| 1970 | 643 |
| 1987 | 588 |
| 2005 | 591 |

== Religion ==
As at 31 August 2013, there are 560 full-time residents in Duchroth, and of those, 410 are Evangelical (73.214%), 68 are Catholic (12.143%), 5 belong to the Palatinate State Free Religious Community (0.893%), 11 (1.964%) belong to other religious groups and 66 (11.786%) either have no religion or will not reveal their religious affiliation.

== Politics ==
=== Municipal council ===
The council is made up of 12 council members, who were elected by majority vote at the municipal election held on 7 June 2009, and the honorary mayor as chairman.

=== Mayor ===
Duchroth's mayor is Jörg Schneiß.

=== Coat of arms ===
Duchroth's arms have only one charge, namely Saint Nicholas, on a gold field. He is the village's patron saint.

== Culture and sightseeing ==
=== Buildings ===
The following are listed buildings or sites in Rhineland-Palatinate’s Directory of Cultural Monuments:

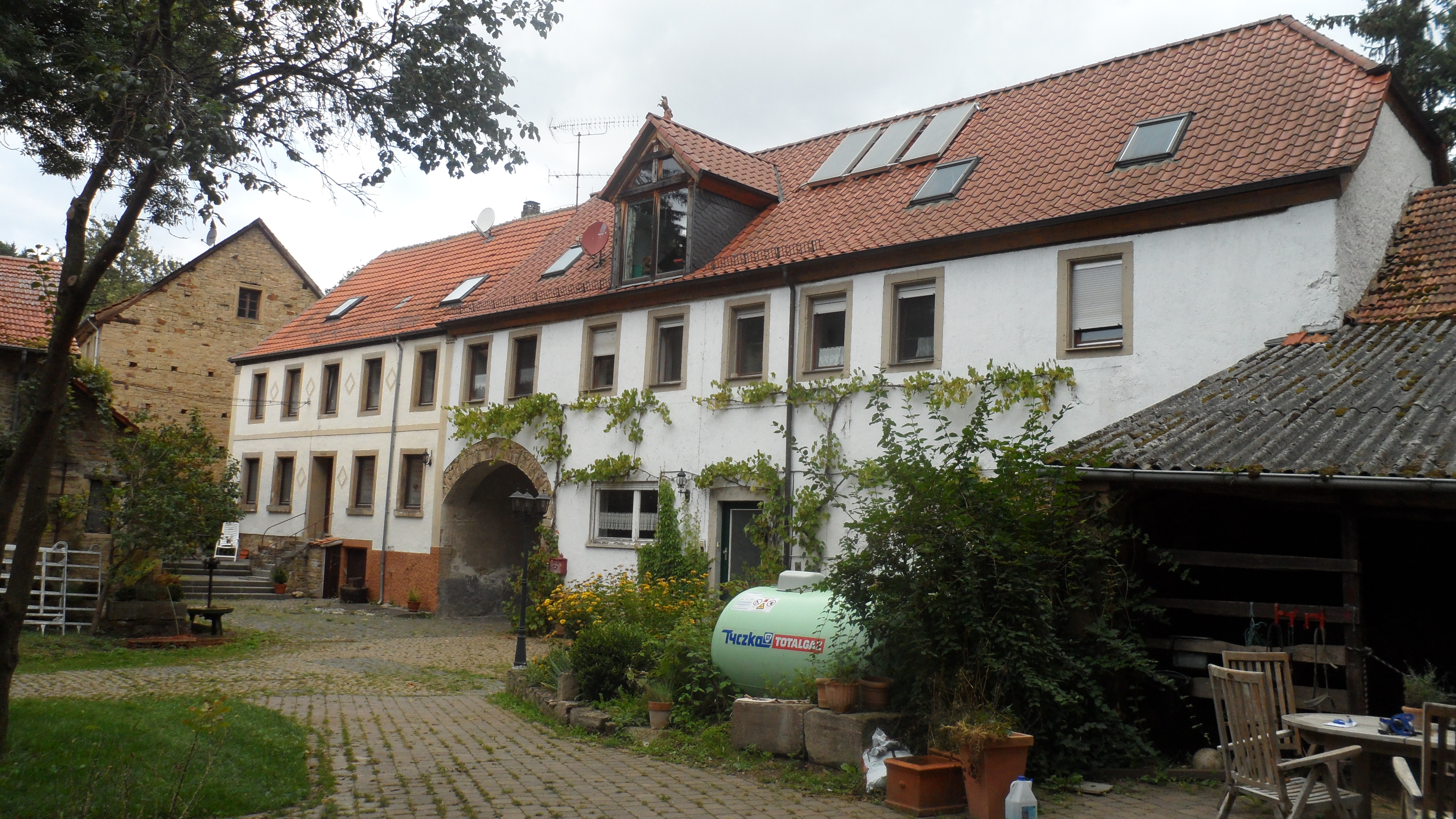
Montforterhof monumental zone – main building

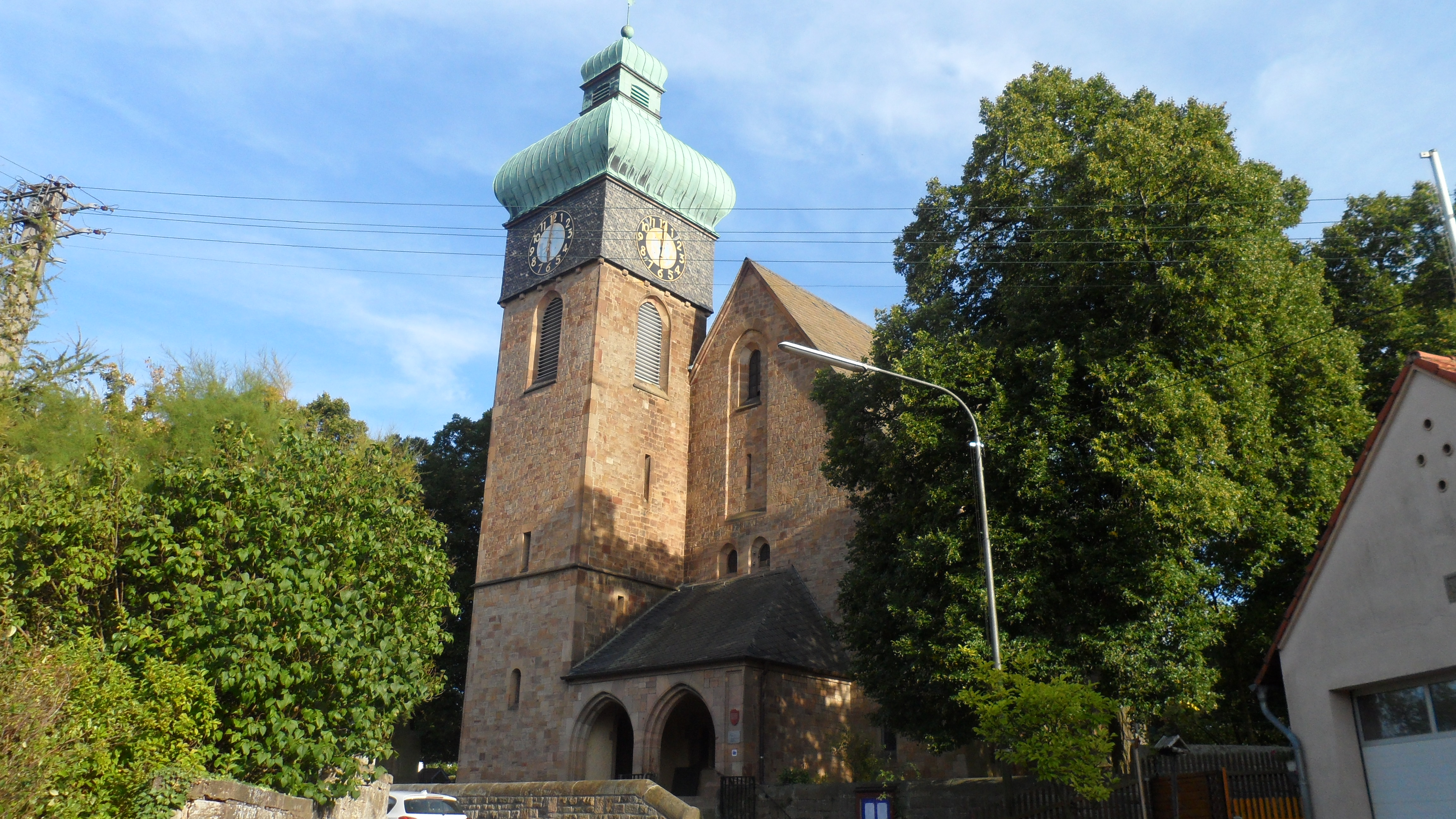
Kirchenstraße – Evangelical parish church

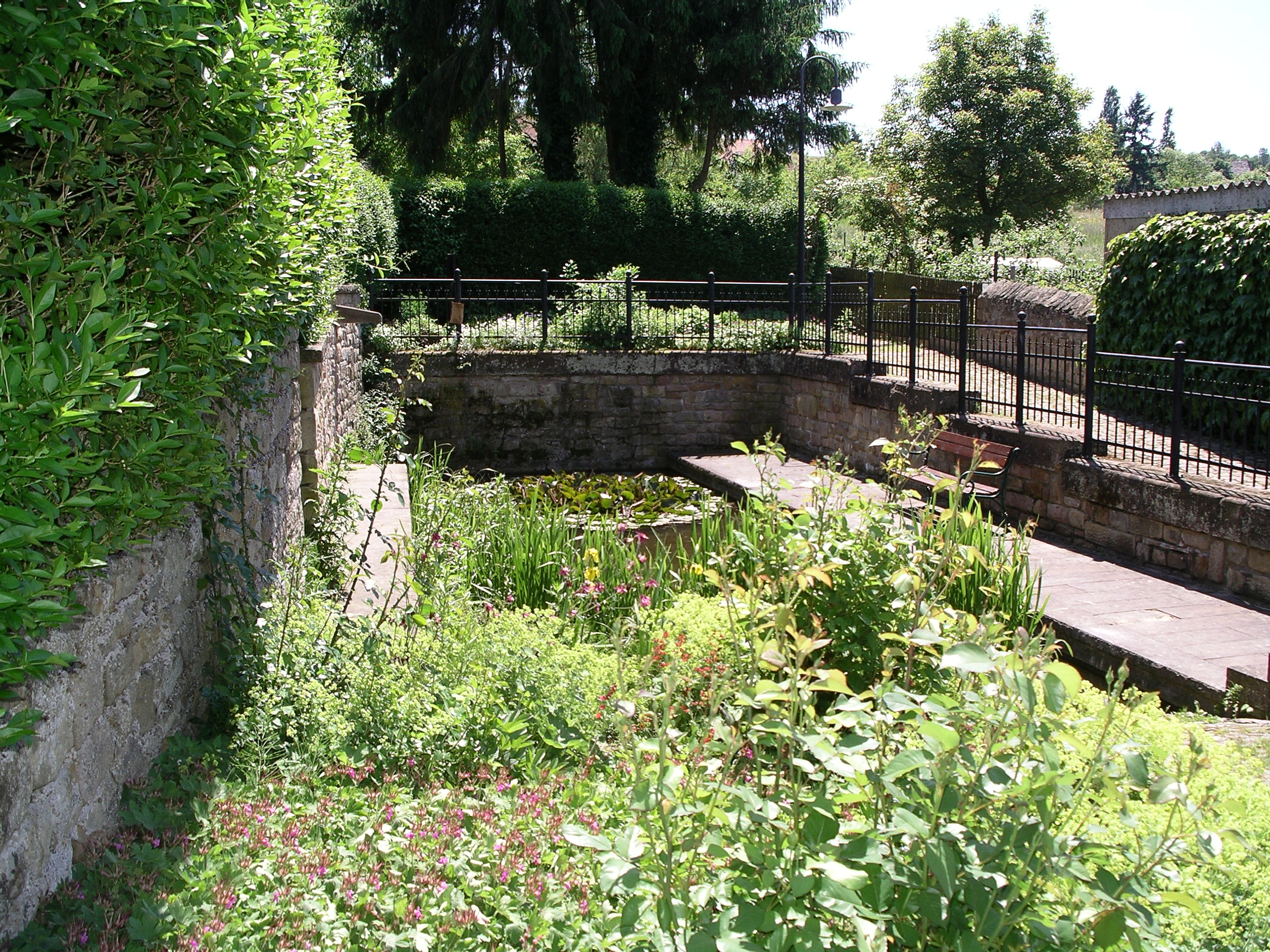
The “Biet” (former fire and laundry pond)

- Village core, Naheweinstraße 29–37 and others (monumental zone) – contiguous historical village arrangement with two-floor buildings, among them a few timber-frame houses, 16th to 20th centuries
- Evangelical parish church, Kirchenstraße – Gothicized sandstone-block building, Heimatstil, 1908–1910, architect Karl Schenkel, Munich-Pasing; warriors’ memorial 1866/1870/1871, lion, last fourth of the 19th century; warriors’ memorial 1914/1918, sandstone-block, 1920s (see also below)
- At Kirchenstraße 4 – spolia, about 1600
- Naheweinstraße 22 – Baroque timber-frame house, 18th century
- Naheweinstraße 29 – “Haus Schumacher”; post-Baroque building with half-hip roof, partly timber-frame, gateways, marked 1802 and 1790 (1796?)
- Naheweinstraße 31 – Einfirsthaus (house with single roof ridge) of a farmstead, partly timber-frame, essentially possibly from the 17th century, marked 1846, gateway beam marked 1801, other gate facility from the late 18th or early 19th century
- Naheweinstraße 33 – Late Gothic town hall; third fourth of the 16th century, conversion on the side towards the street, 19th century (see also below)
- Naheweinstraße 35 – estate complex, building with half-hip roof with timber-frame additions, gateway arch marked 1802
- Naheweinstraße 37 – Baroque timber-frame house, partly solid, 18th century; house door marked 1846
- Naheweinstraße 40/42 – “Haus Lindemann”; Late Baroque complex with single roof ridge, marked 1786, barn, partly timber-frame, marked 1786
- Naheweinstraße 46 – Baroque timber-frame house, to a great extent plastered, 18th century, ground floor made over in Classicist style
- Naheweinstraße 70 – winery, four-sided estate; quarrystone buildings, Heimatstil, about 1910
- Naheweinstraße 72 – former school; house, Classicist plastered building with seven-part ribbon windows, mid 19th century
- Obere Wassergasse 14 – small house, partly timber-frame, earlier half of the 19th century
- At Pfarrgasse 6 – house door, Classicist, marked 1863
- At Pfarrgasse 7 – house door, door leaf, mid 19th century
- Pfarrgasse 8 – Evangelical rectory; villalike building with hip roof, Heimatstil, about 1900
- At Schlossstraße 1 – house door, Late Classicist, 1864
- At Schlossstraße 4 – two pieces of spolia, about 1600 (?)
- Untere Wassergasse 16 – former complex with single roof ridge; earlier half of the 19th century
- Untere Wassergasse 10, 12, 14, 16 (monumental zone) – four complexes with single roof ridge from the 19th century forming an estate-like arrangement at the end of a cul-de-sac.
- Wassergasse 12 – house door, marked 1815
- At Weinbergstraße 2 – Classicist skylight portal, marked 1835
- Montforterhof (monumental zone) – essentially presumably “new Schloss in the dale” of the family Boos von Waldeck, as of 1480 (Renaissance spolia, 16th to early 18th centuries), 16th to 19th centuries; now four farmsteads; main building (no. 3/5): building with half-hip roof with gateway arch, essentially possibly from the 18th and early 19th centuries

=== More about the church ===
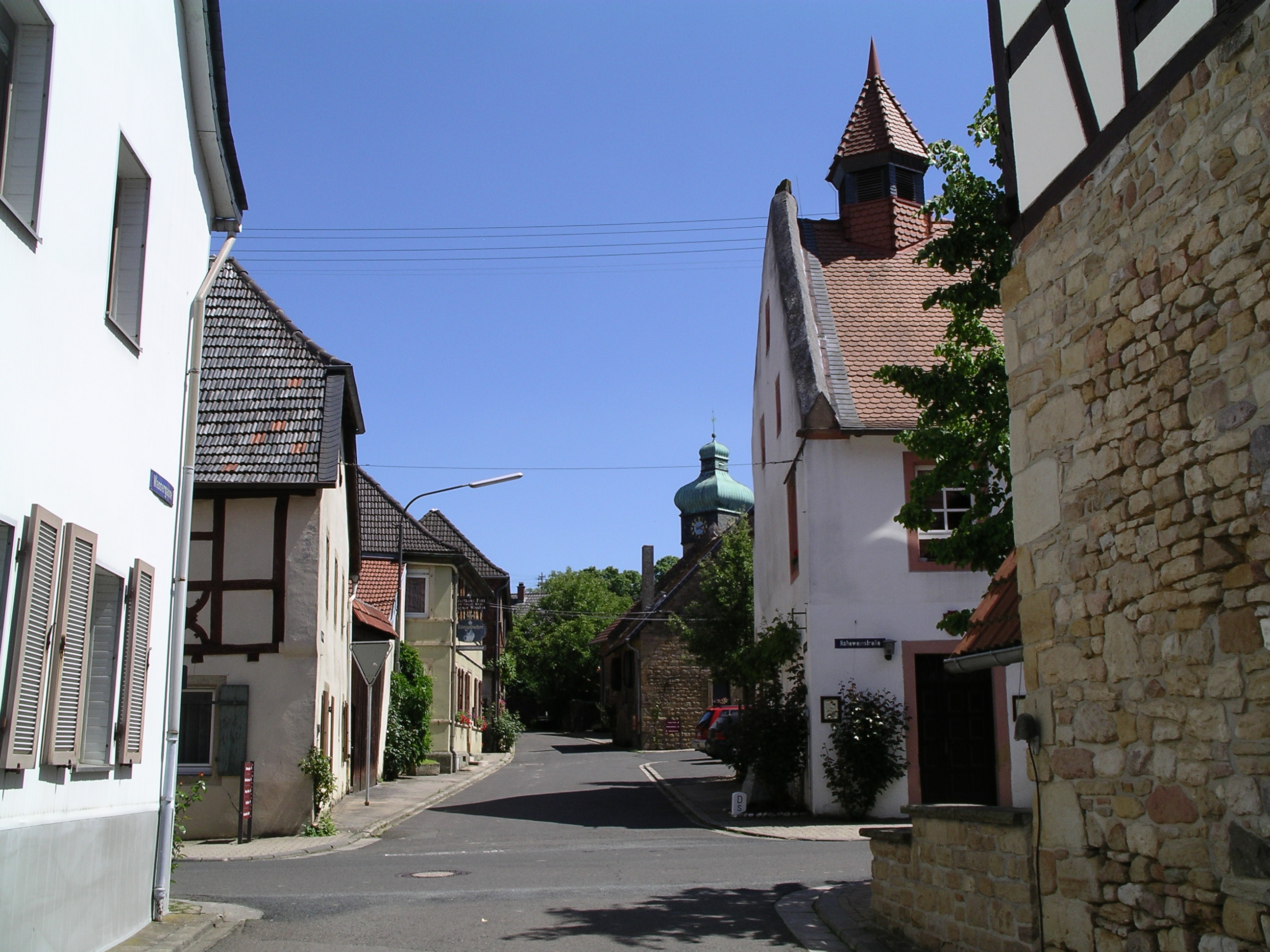
Village street, town hall, church

There are about 800 parishioners all together, counting those from both Duchroth and neighbouring Oberhausen an der Nahe. Duchroth's old church burnt right down in the great fire that struck the village in 1905, making a new one necessary. This was built between 1908 and 1910 to plans by Munich architect Karl Schenkel, and on 4 September 1910, it was consecrated. The 30 m-tall belltower and the onion-vaulted roof make it visible across a great distance. One peculiarity is the clock mechanism, which has to be wound up by hand every day. Slightly older than the church itself is the rectory, built in 1906, standing across the street from the church. Built out of sandstone, it affords its occupants comfortable coolth in the summer months. In the winter, however, its high ceilings (3.25 m) can make it necessary for them to don one or more extra layers of clothing. Also falling victim to the blaze in 1905 were the old parish hall and the parish barn. A new parish hall (without a barn) has only in recent years been built. This can comfortably accommodate 80 to 100 people. Church community groups meet here.

=== More about the town hall ===
The town hall (Rathaus) is surely one of Duchroth's oldest buildings. It is believed to have been built in the 16th century, although there are no documents establishing this. Undertaken in 1982, at a cost of some €225,000, was a thorough renovation led by the Didion architectural agency. On the strength of the structural survey by the architects, the time of building was reckoned to be the 11th or 12th century, not the 16th. This is likelier, since the town hall was built in the Gothic style. According to Didion, the building comes from the oldest time of the Gothic period. All buildings in the area built in the Gothic style that still stand today are made of quarrystone and slate material. The back and gables are in typical Gothic style and well preserved. Regrettably, the windows on the street side have been enlarged and the Gothic façade no longer appears in its original form. On the righthand gable side is found a round-arched window. It is richly moulded and the keystone bears an image of a mask hewn into the stone. The column with the top beam, which is still standing near the entrance, suggests that there was once a great space, opened to the outside here. Once sitting on the roof was a ridge turret that held one of the Palatinate's most interesting bells. The bell's shape alone suggests that it was very old, likewise the puzzling inscription upon the rim: “+ O A S O +”, likely standing for OMNIA AD SALVTEM OMNIVM, meaning “Everything to everyone’s Salvation”. The bell is believed to have come from Disibodenberg Abbey, whose six bells were shared out after Secularization to villages that had in bygone times been subject to the old abbey. The bell measured 68 cm across and was made of prime cast iron. Akin in shape was a bell from Aachen, which was cast in 1261. In 1894, the bell was fetched down from the ridge turret and sold for a few Pfennig, because it had cracked. The turret itself was torn down after the Second World War because it had fallen into disrepair. In its long, eventful history, the Rathaus has served not only for meetings and consultations of the municipal representatives and the clubs, but also as a prison (windows with iron grilles), a prison camp, a courthouse, a schoolhouse, a dwelling, a shelter in case of war, a storehouse, a garage for the hearse (in a leanto shed) and a communal bakehouse.

=== “Ring path” ===
From time to time in the Middle Ages, the Knights of Montfort drew their subjects in Duchroth into their disputes with other nobles. In the 1335 feud with St. Stephen's Collegiate Foundation in Mainz, for example, the villagers were armed and led into battle as a militant cohort. The Montforts, for their part, assumed a duty to protect their subjects, by giving the village Pfortenrecht (“gate rights”), whereby the villagers were allowed to build two fortified gates and to gird their village with a moat and an abatis. Even the churchyard was fortified with a mighty wall and incorporated into the defensive complex. Also belonging to this was a hefty stone defensive tower, actually the churchtower, with arrowslits, which the municipality built. This tower even withstood the pickaxe after the great fire in 1905 and had to be demolished with explosives. The mediaeval village court was always anxious to keep the fence around the village gapless. The defensive system herein described likely proved its worth during the “Duchroth War” in 1418, for Duke Stephan of Zweibrücken, in the agreement of atonement, reserved to himself the right to avail himself of the two villages of Duchroth and Oberhausen along with their churchyards in case of feud. The moat that the villagers dug around their village defined its shape as a clump village. The only ways into the village then were the two gates, the Untertor (Lower Gate) and the Obertor (Upper Gate). The former stood where the Ringpfad (“ring path”) now crosses Naheweinstraße. Except for the village thoroughfare, then known as the Große Gasse (“Great Lane”), running from one village gate to the other, all village streets were dead ends, ending at either a yard or the village's edge. The mediaeval fortifications around Duchroth, and the two gates no longer exist. Nevertheless, the Historischer Ringpfad still follows the alignment of the now long gone moat.

=== “Grape variety teaching path” ===
Grape growing has a centuries-long tradition in Duchroth. Just as varied as the structure of the lands are the vineyard soils in Duchroth's outlying countryside. What is found here mostly is weathered minerals of volcanic origin, but also mixtures of slate, pebbles and sandstone. To the northwest, sheltered by the Hunsrück’s heights, the most varied of white wine grape varieties thrive in a dry climate favourable to grapevines: Riesling, Silvaner, Müller-Thurgau, Kerner, Bacchus, Pinot blanc, Pinot gris, Faberrebe, Chardonnay, Scheurebe, Sauvignon blanc and Ehrenfelser. Also grown here for making red wine and rosé are Pinot noir, Dornfelder and Regent. The Rebsortenlehrpfad (“Grape variety teaching path”) teaches the visitor all about these varieties.

=== Clubs ===
The following clubs are active in Duchroth:

- Angelverein — angling club
- Förderverein Aktionsräume — “Home Ranges” promotional association
- Förderverein Feuerwehr — fire brigade promotional association
- Förderverein TuS Duchroth — TuS Duchroth promotional association
- Freiwillige Feuerwehr — volunteer fire brigade
- Kultur und Landschaft Duchroth — “Duchroth Culture and Landscape”
- Landfrauen — countrywomen's club
- TuS Duchroth — gymnastic and sport club.

== Economy and infrastructure ==
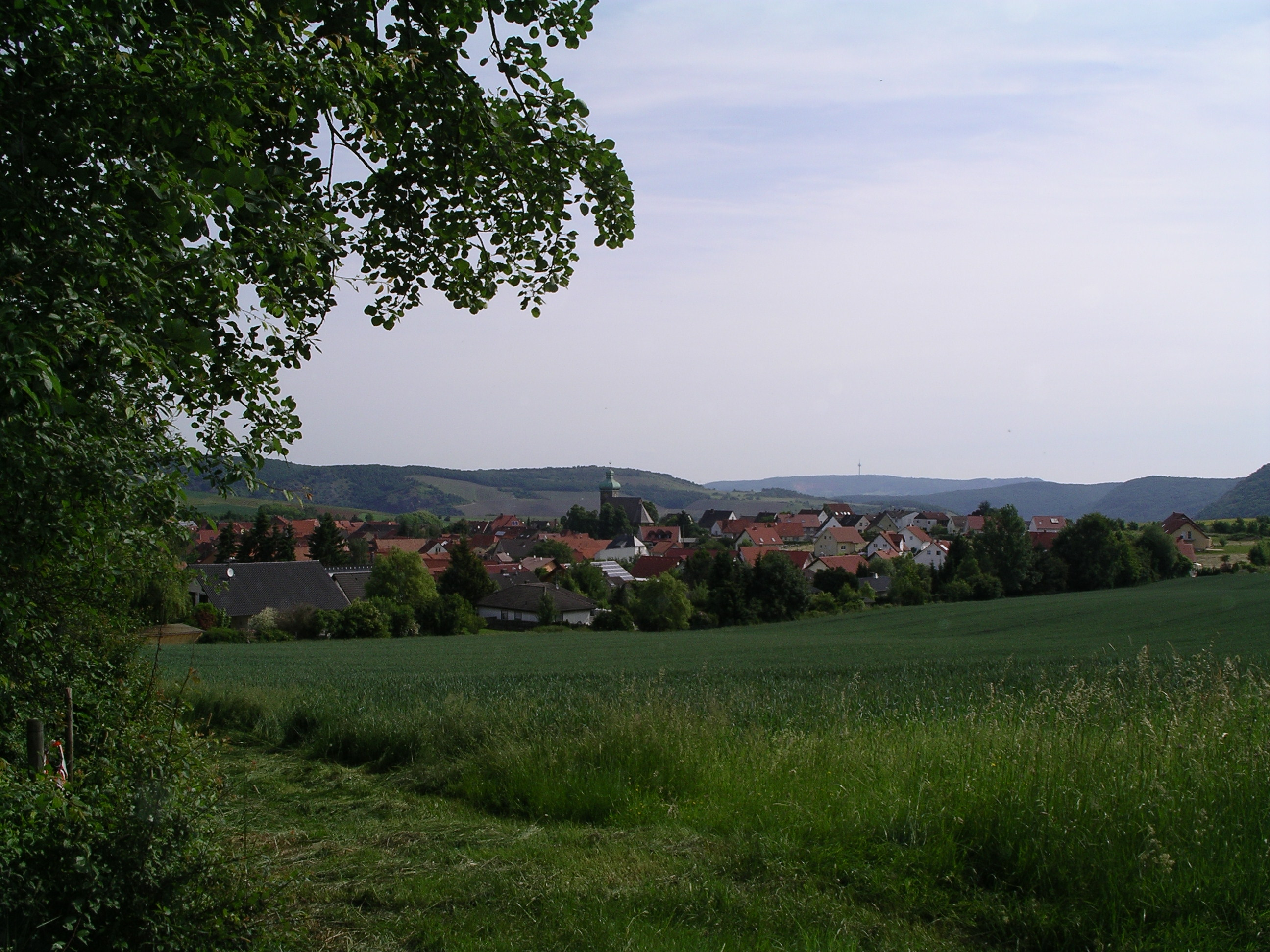
View of Duchroth

=== Winegrowing ===
Duchroth belongs to the “Nahetal Winegrowing Area” within the Nahe wine region. In business in the village are eleven winegrowing operations, and the area of vineyard planted is 35 ha. Some 85% of the wine grown here (as at 2007) is white wine varieties. In 1979, there were still 36 winegrowing operations, and the vineyard area, at 59 ha, was almost twice what it is now.

=== Transport ===
To Duchroth's north runs Bundesstraße 41. Serving Norheim and Staudernheim are railway stations on the Nahe Valley Railway (Bingen–Saarbrücken).

== Famous people ==
=== Sons and daughters of the town ===
- Johann Eimann (1764–1847), German colonist in the Kingdom of Hungary
- August Geib (1842–1879), early socialist lyricist, book dealer and Member of the Reichstag, founding member of the Social Democratic Party of Germany and its first treasurer.
