= Nahe (Rhine) =

River in Germany

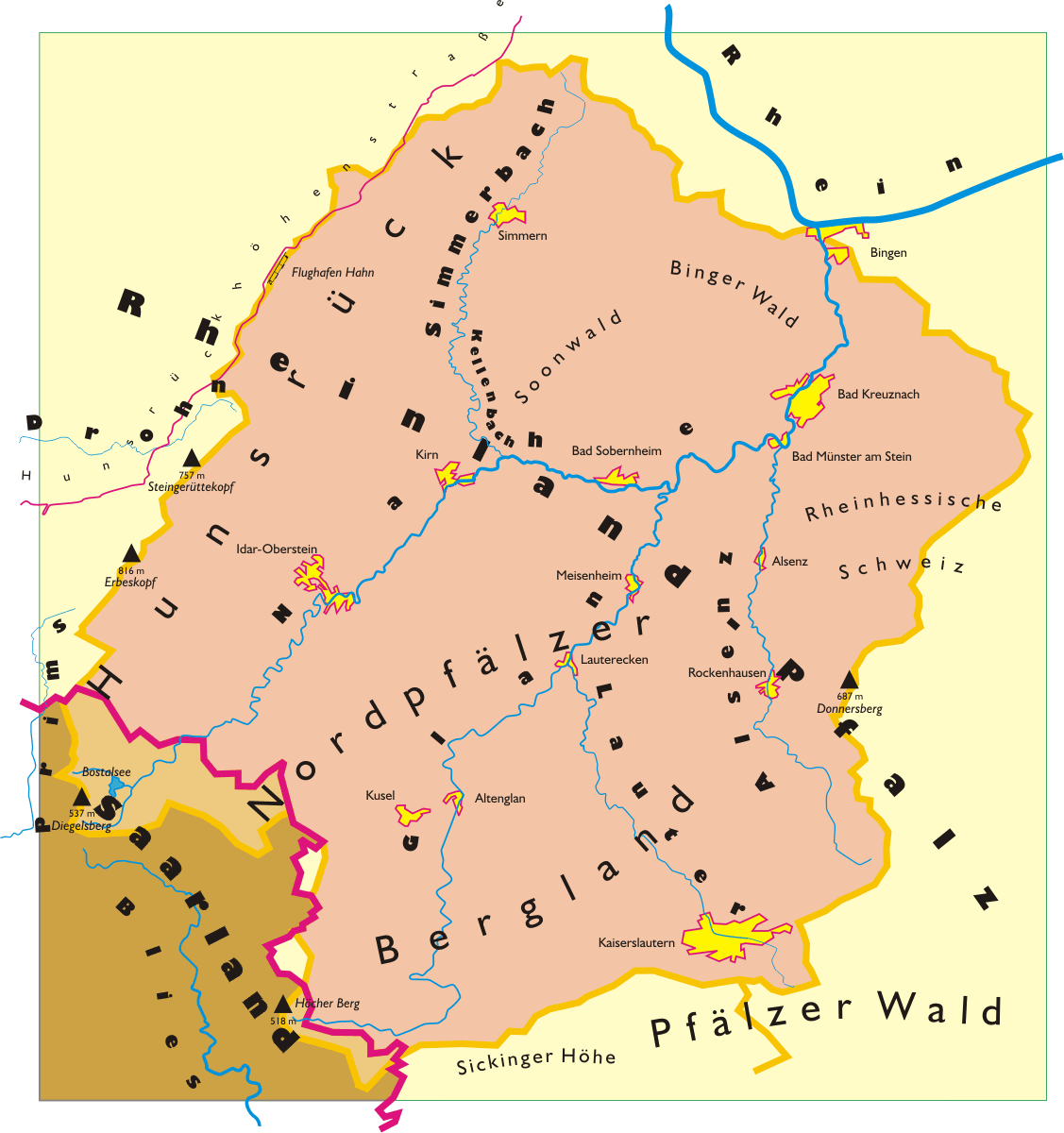
- Drainage basin of the Nahe river and its tributaries

Location
- Country: Germany

Physical characteristics
- Source
  - location: Hunsrück
- Mouth
  - location: Rhine
  - coordinates: 49°58′11″N 7°53′21″E
- Length: 125.1 km (77.7 mi)
- Basin size: 4,067 km^{2} (1,570 sq mi)

Basin features
- Progression: Rhine→ North Sea

The Nahe (German pronunciation: [ˈnaːə]) is a river in Rhineland-Palatinate and Saarland, Germany, a left tributary to the Rhine. It has also given name to the wine region Nahe situated around it.

The name Nahe is derived from the Latin word Nava, which is supposed to be based upon the Celtic origin for the wild river. The Nahe separates the northern part of the Palatinate from the Hunsrück.

It rises in the area of Nohfelden (Saarland) at the district of Selbach, flowing through Rhineland-Palatinate and joining the Rhine in Bingen. Its length is 125 kilometres (78 mi). Towns along the Nahe include Idar-Oberstein, Kirn, Bad Kreuznach and Bingen.

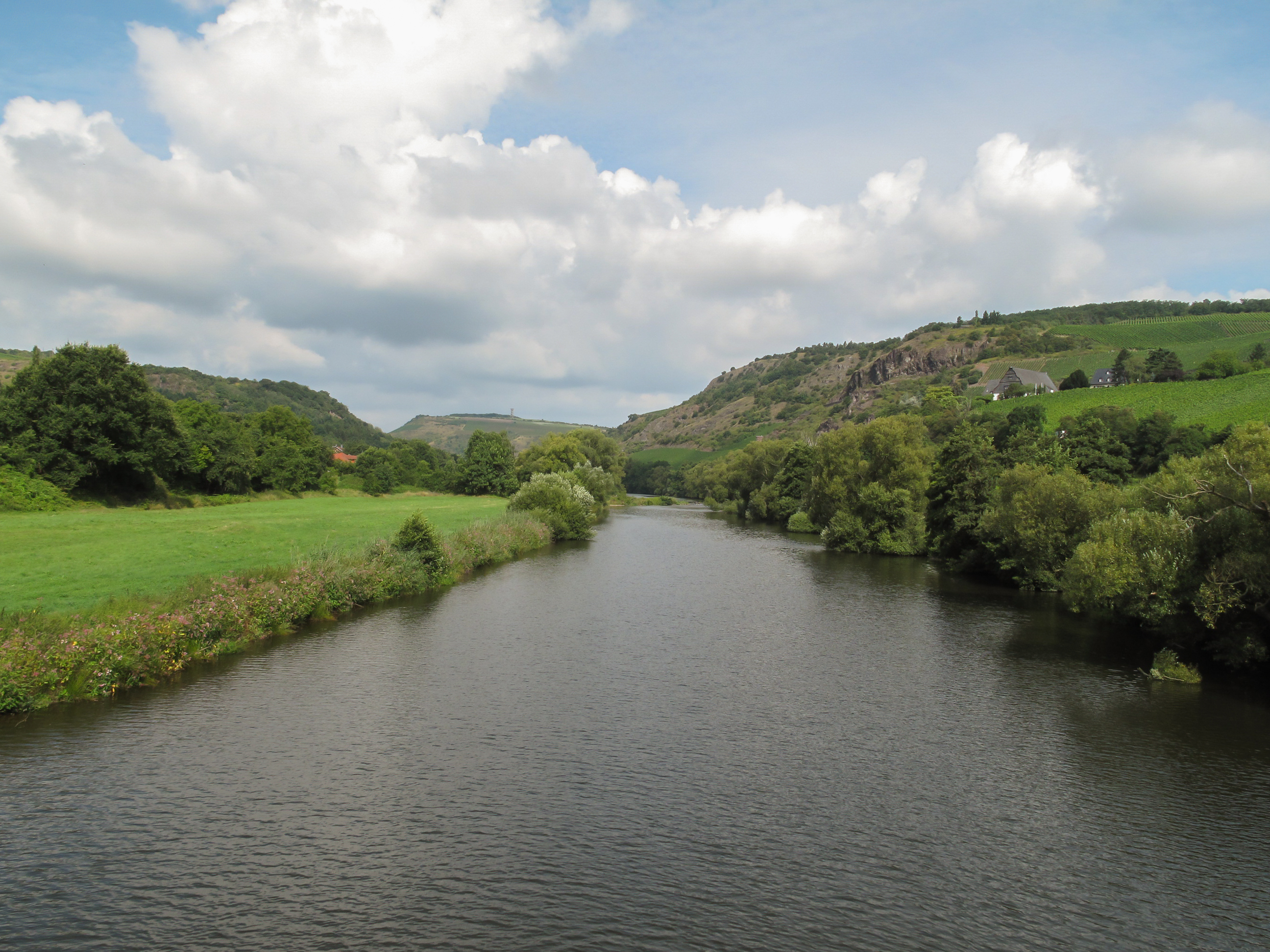
Near Oberhausen an der Nahe

== Hydrology ==
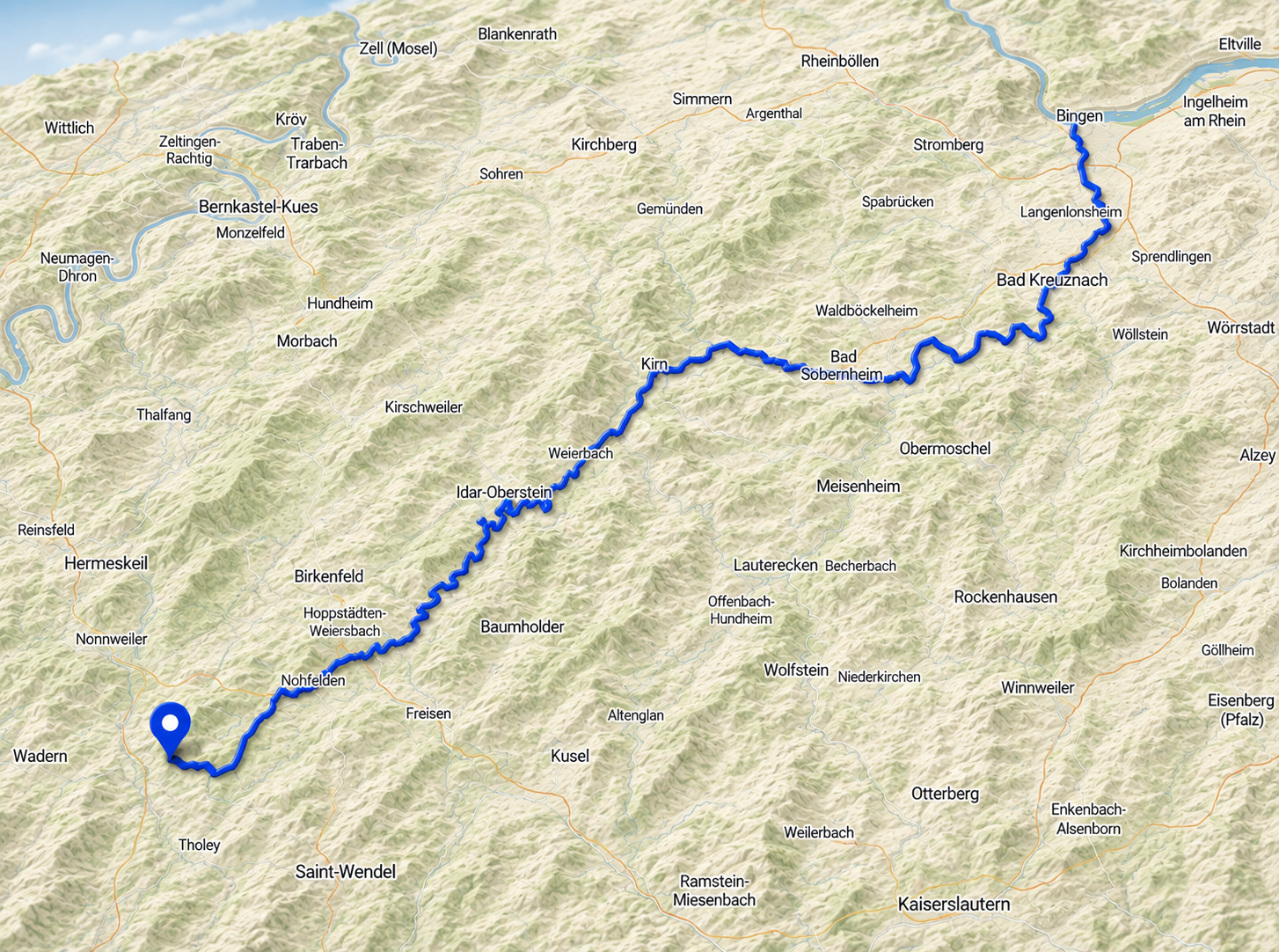

The drainage basin of the river covers an area of 4,067 square kilometres (1,570 mi^{2}). Due to this relatively large area compared to the river's length high floods can occur along its middle and lower course within only a few hours, however flowing off also quickly. In 1993 and 1995 in Bad Kreuznach a flow of more than 1,000 cubic metres per second (35,000 cu ft/s) was measured and more than 1,300 cubic metres per second (46,000 cu ft/s) at its mouth into the Rhine.

The dimensions of the drainage basin are shown in the map. Its boundaries clock-wise, beginning in the East:

- the highlands of the Rheinhessische Schweiz as drainage divide to the Rhine
- the Donnersberg massif as drainage divide to the rivers Selz and Rhine
- the North Palatine Uplands as drainage divide to the rivers Pfrimm and Rhine eastwards as well as to the rivers Wallhalb and Schwarzbach (Blies) southwards
- the Hunsrück as drainage divide to the rivers Prims, Blies and Saar in the South respectively to the Moselle in the North
- the mountains of the Binger Wald (Bingen forest) as drainage divide to the Rhine towards North

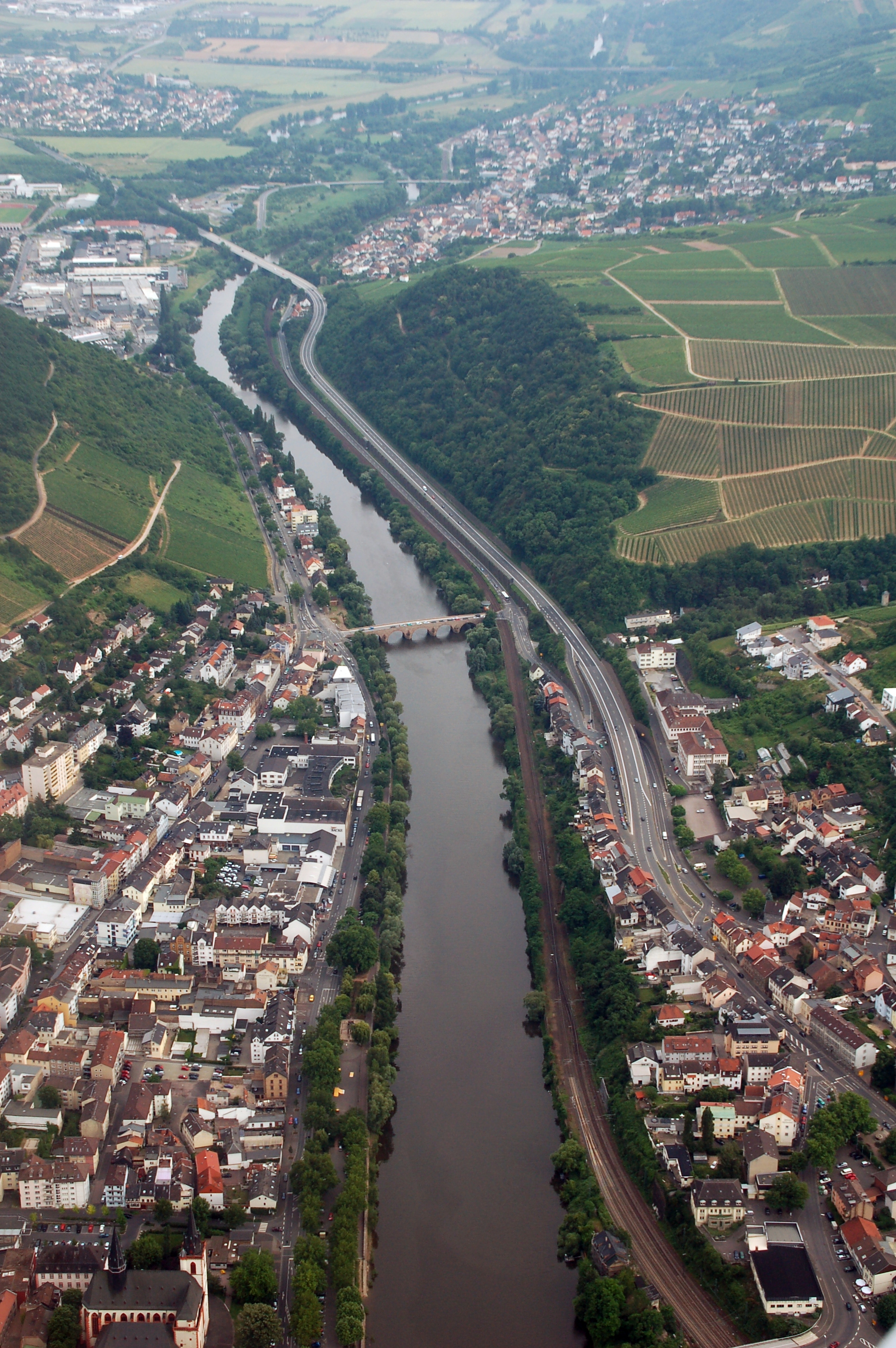
Lower river course near Bingen

== Geology and wildlife ==
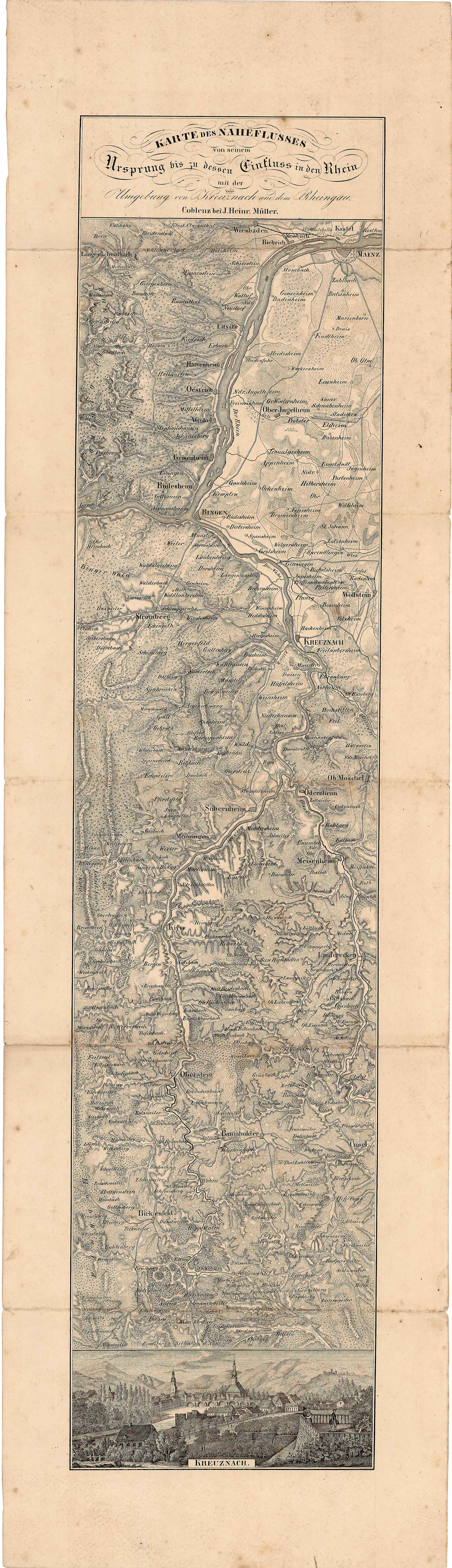
Map of the course of the Nahe (1845)

The rocks in the Nahe region are predominantly of Cisuralian (early Permian) age and part of the Rotliegendes. At that time, an impetuous volcanism appeared in the region. Huge deposits of the reddish volcanic rock Rhyolite and of the more alkaline volcanic rock Andesite were left. The valleys of the Nahe and its tributaries have been being formed since 2.6 million years ago during the Quaternary, the geologically latest period, as a result of ground heaving of the surrounding mountains of Hunsrück and North Palatine Uplands. This led to a steep decline of all waters and hence to strong erosion activities. Particularly strong erosion occurred in warmer melting periods during the ice ages, when tundra climate reigned, and the soil was not protected by a dense cover of vegetation. Depending on the underground, narrow gorges with cliffy precipices arose in areas with hard volcanic rocks or wide gentle valleys with flood plains in areas with soft sedimentary deposits. The frequent change between both forms is charming along the Nahe.

In the Nahe valley, a huge number of thermophile species appear which usually can only be found in the mediterranean region or Eurasian steppe habitats. Characteristical species of plants are e. g. Alyssum montanum, Aster linosyris ("Goldilocks Aster"), Dictamnus albus ("White Dittany"), Dianthus grationopolitanus ("Cheddar Pink"), Gagea bohemica subsp. saxatilis ("Early-Star-of-Bethlehem"), Galium glaucum ("Glaucous Bedstraw"), Oxytropis pilosa or Stipa tirsa. These plants immigrated in a postglacial warm period to Europe but became extinct in most regions when the climate changed again to significantly cooler and more humid conditions. They only survived in small but still warm and dry places due to special geographic situations. In the Nahe valley and its tributaries these are mostly rocky precipices towards South or South-East, furthermore sunny slopes with shrubs, bushes and dry broad-leaved forests. On hot summer days the soil temperatures in these places can reach 60 °C/140 °F and above with truly steppe-like circumstances. A characteristical thermophile animal species is the insulated population of the dice snake (Natrix tessellata) that exists along the Nahe. The snake is very addicted to water and captures small fishes.

Places of botanical and/or zoological significance are classified as nature protection areas and accompany the course of the Nahe. For instance can be mentioned the "Hellberg" near Kirn, the "Flachsberg" near Martinstein, the "Heimberg" near Waldböckelheim, the "Gangelsberg" near Duchroth and the "Rotenfels" as well as the "Rheingrafenstein" near Bad Münster am Stein.

== Tourism ==
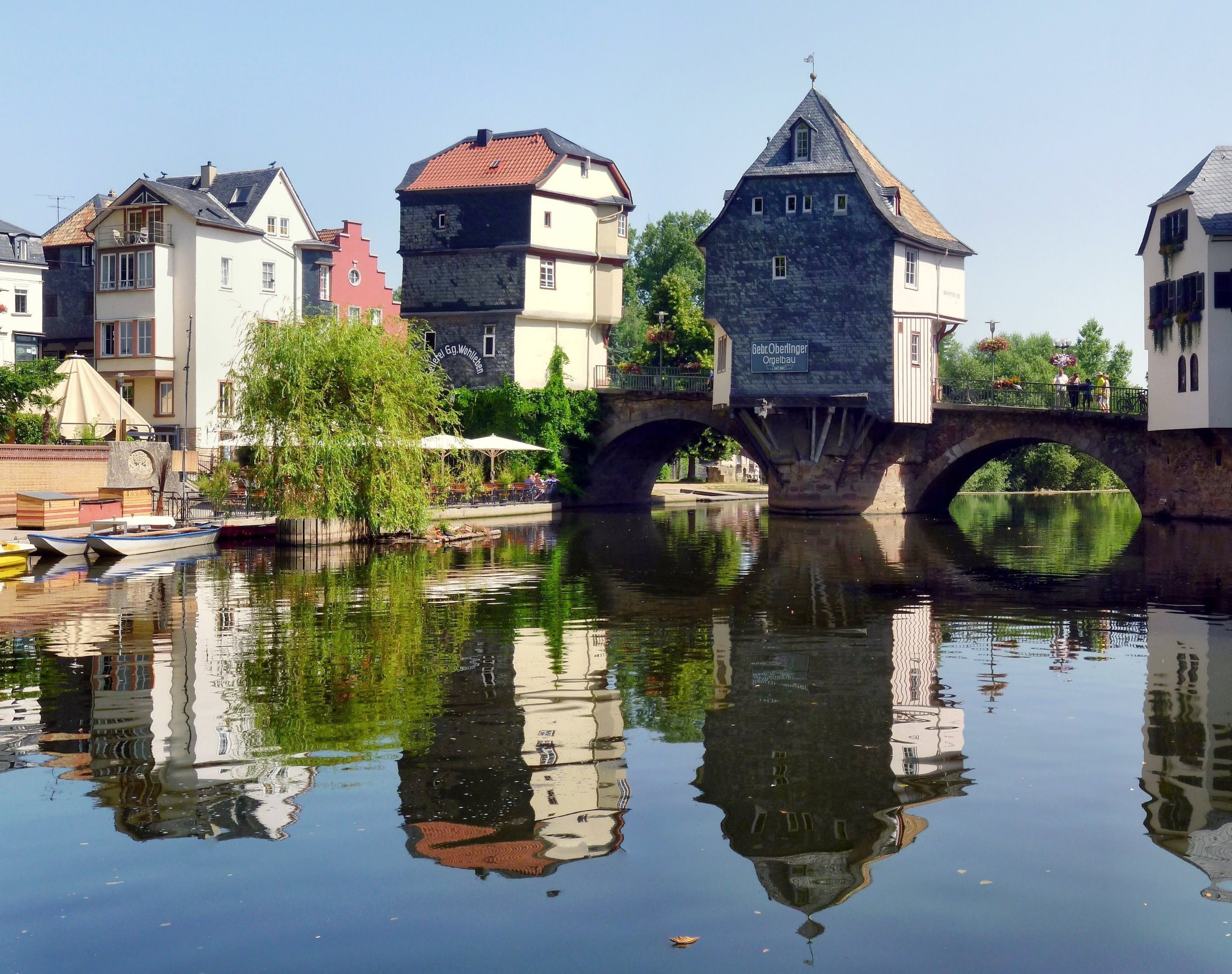
Houses on the medieval Alte Nahebrücke

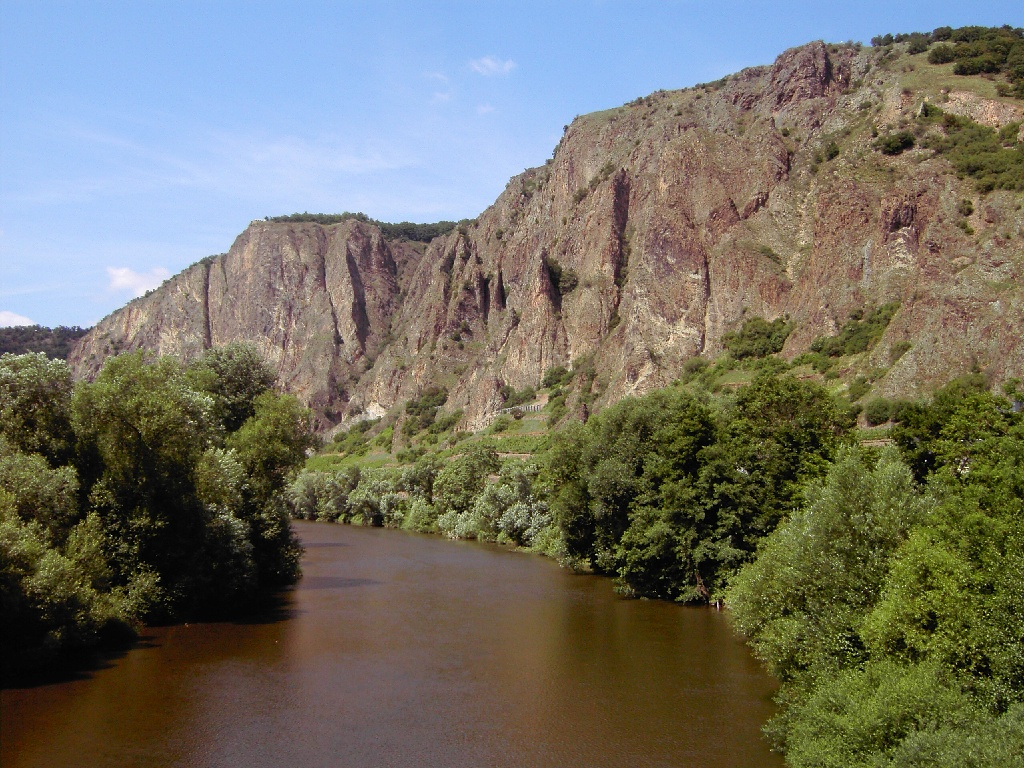
"Rotenfels" in Bad Münster am Stein-Ebernburg

The Nahe region offers various tourist attractions:

Nahe cycling route – The route leads along the river from its spring to its entry.

Nahe wine region – The wine-producing area surrounding the middle and lower river is famous for its white wines, dominated by the Riesling grape variety.

Castles and monasteries – On the heights on both shores numerous medieval castles and abbeys can be visited, most of them fallen into ruin. Most noted are the Kyrburg Castle in Kirn, the castles Ebernburg and Rheingrafenstein in Bad Münster am Stein-Ebernburg and the Klopp Castle in Bingen. The monastery ruin of Disibodenberg, located on top of a hill between the junction of the Nahe and the Glan, was founded at the beginning of the 8th century by Saint Disibod, an Irish missionary. Saint Hildegard of Bingen, a famous Christian mystic, also lived here for a while.

Gemstone town Idar-Oberstein - The town is famous for its historic gemstone mines and related trades. Some of them are open to visitors. The German Gemstone Museum boasts many gemstone exhibits.

Bad Kreuznach - The baths which give the town its name contain the noble gas radon, with supposedly curative properties. The town's most famous site is the Alte Nahebrücke (Old Nahe Bridge), one of the few remaining bridges in the world with buildings on it.

Saline valley - Between Bad Münster am Stein and Bad Kreuznach the scenic valley of the Nahe has some bathing sites with hydrothermal and saline springs. Graduation towers, formerly used for salt production, are regarded as having beneficial health effects. The so-called "Rotenfels" (red rock), a steep cliff nearby with a height of 202 metres (663 ft) and a length of 1,200 metres (3,900 ft) was formed by the Nahe.

Bad Sobernheim - The open-air museum of Rhineland-Palatinate in Bad Sobernheim has an exhibition four traditional villages with refurbished historic houses from different regions of Rhineland-Palatinate.

The region is accessible via federal highway B41 which is connected to the motorways A60/A61 in the East and A62 in the West. Moreover, there is a railway line along the Nahe with regular connections between Mainz and Saarbrücken and stations in all bigger towns. Some 40 kilometres (25 mi) to the north the Frankfurt-Hahn Airport is in the Hunsrück, offering daily flights to London Stansted and further weekly and seasonal connections.

== See also ==
- List of rivers of Rhineland-Palatinate
- List of rivers of Saarland
