= Kubach & Kropp =

Collaborative team of stone sculptors

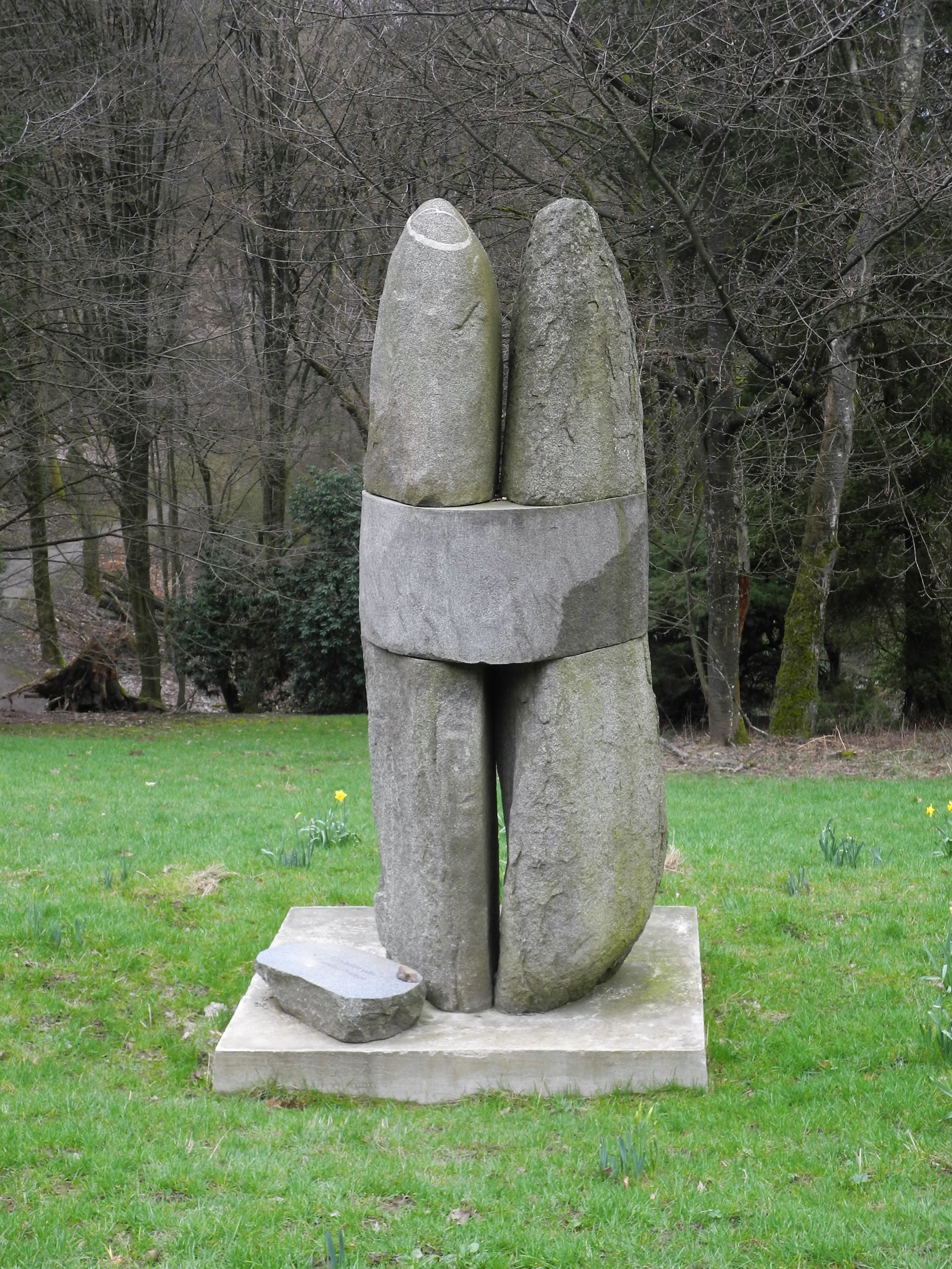
Kubach & Kropp: Stone of Encounter, located between Barmer Anlagen and Waldfrieden Sculpture Park, Wuppertal

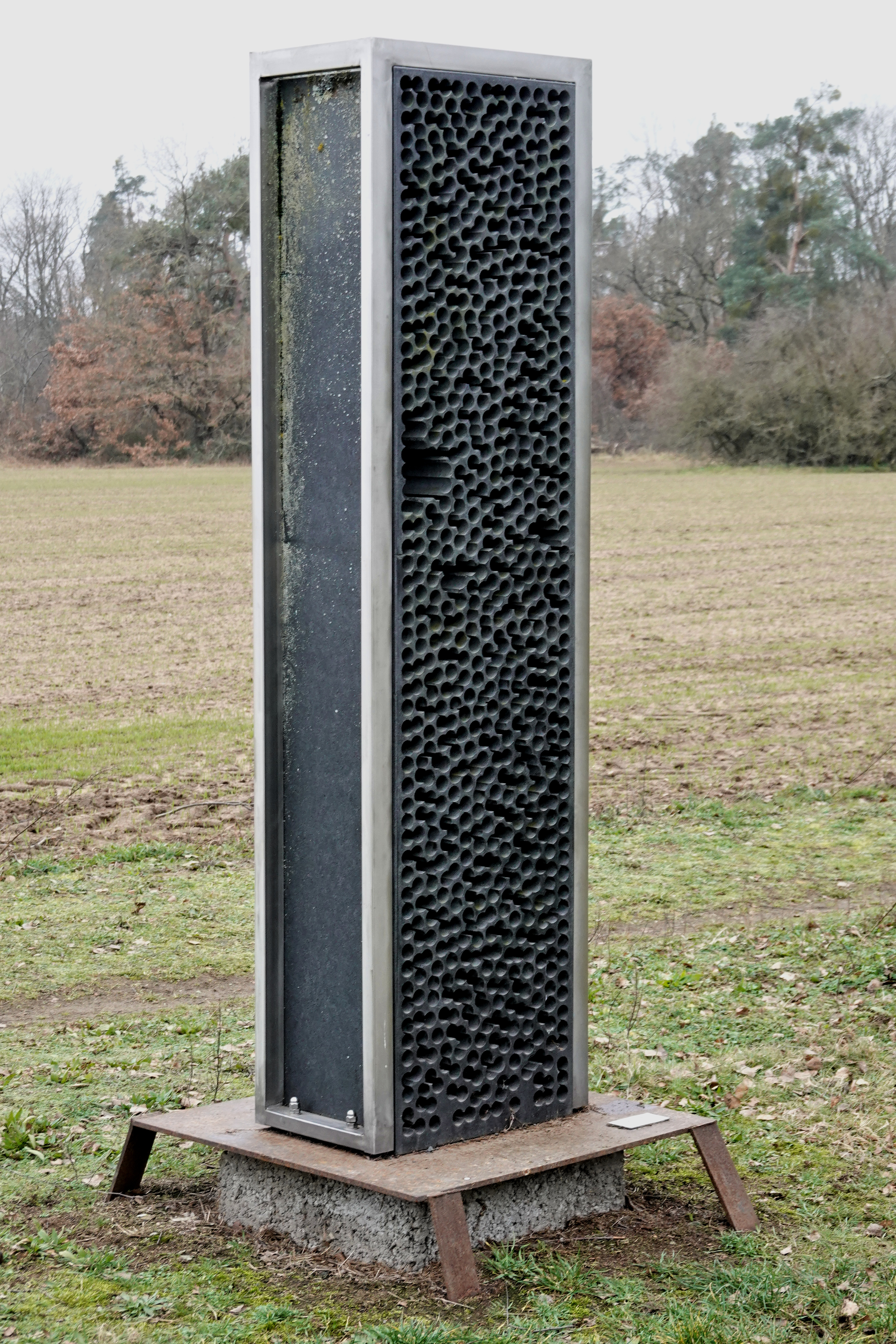
"Lochstein" by Kubach & Kropp in Mörfelden-Walldorf

Livia Kubach (born 1966 in Bad Münster am Stein) and Michael Kropp (born 1960 in Cologne) are a German sculptor couple. They live and work together in Bad Münster am Stein.

== Life and work ==
Livia Kubach, daughter of the sculptor couple Kubach-Wilmsen, known for their book sculptures, studied at the Düsseldorf Art Academy under Tony Cragg and became a master student of Günther Uecker in 1995. Her husband, Michael Kropp, studied education in Cologne, is a musician and self-taught sculptor.

Kubach & Kropp utilize stone as their primary material, preferring black granites from various regions of the world. The pair's work is primarily abstract, and emphasizes line and pattern over naturalism. Different types of stone are combined, and different elements are connected by drill cores. Their sculptures often have are designed with acoustic elements in mind, and invite the viewer to interact. In "Stones for Silence," for example, a sound is heard when the viewer moves over the slats.

Kubach and Kropp do not conform or identify with any movement. Their sculptures have been shown at international exhibitions, art fairs and are held in art collections. Over the years, their work has been included in several solo and group exhibitions in galleries and museums worldwide. The artist team has had solo exhibitions at Museum Buchheim, Bernried, Galerie Spielvogel, Munich or Castle Park Museum, Bad Kreuznach.

Their work is held in public collections and displayed in public spaces. Some examples: Bad Münster am Stein, Bad Kreuznach, Bernried, Eitdorf, Eschborn, Ingelheim, Landau, Pirmasens, Walldorf, Wöllstein and Wuppertal.

A CD was produced by Dirk Marwedel and Kubach & Krupp, titled Steinskulpturen (Stonesculptures)..

== Bibliography ==
- Kubach & Kropp – Stones for Tranquility. Engelhard und Bauer, Karlsruhe, 2002, ISBN 978-3-925521-85-0
- Kubach & Kropp – Stone Sculptures. Exhibition catalogue, Galerie Winter, Wiesbaden, 2005, ISBN 978-3-9809559-1-1
- Kubach & Kropp – Sculptures in Stone. Edited by Wolfgang Zemter. Witten, 2009, ISBN 978-3-941100-64-0
- Kubach & Kropp – Stones of Tranquility / Steine der Stille". - Chiaroscuro, a Gallery for Contemporary Art & Photography. - Bad Münster am Stein 2002 with CD ISBN 978-3-925521-85-0
