= Bad Münster am Stein-Ebernburg =

- Borough of Bad Kreuznach
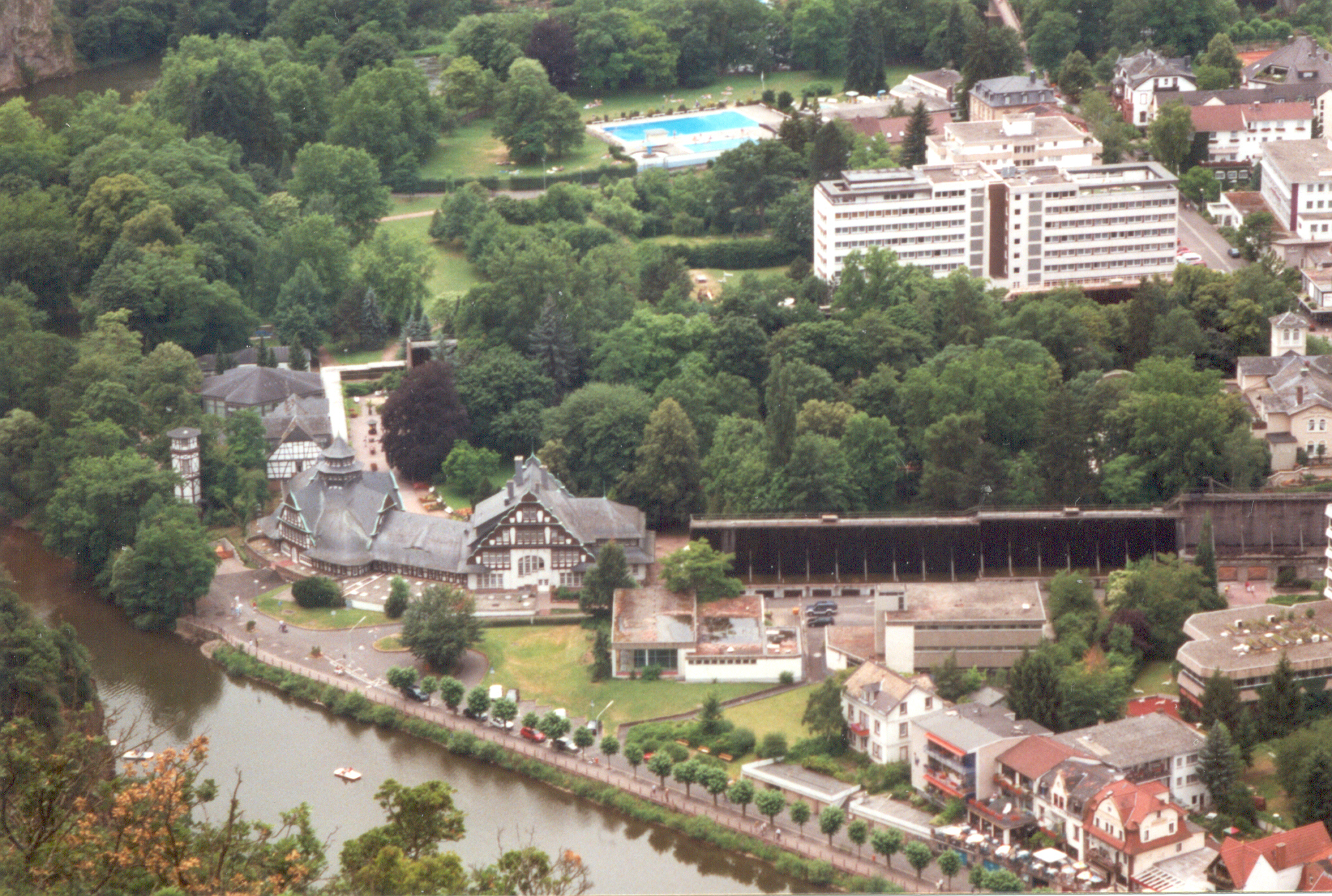

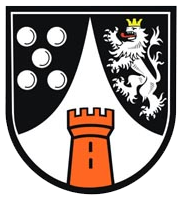
- Coat of arms

- Location of Bad Münster am Stein-Ebernburg within Bad Kreuznach
- Interactive map of Bad Münster am Stein-Ebernburg
- Location within Germany Location within Rhineland-Palatinate
- Coordinates: 49°48′33″N 07°50′38″E
- Country: Germany
- State: Rhineland-Palatinate
- District: Bad Kreuznach
- Town: Bad Kreuznach

Area
  - Total: 9.53 km^{2} (3.68 sq mi)
- Elevation: 282 m (925 ft)
- Time zone: UTC+01:00 (CET)
  - Summer (DST): UTC+02:00 (CEST)
- Postal codes: 55583
- Dialling codes: 06708
- Vehicle registration: KH

Bad Münster am Stein-Ebernburg (German pronunciation: [baːt ˈmʏnstɐ ʔam ˈʃtaɪn ˈʔeːbɐnbʊʁk]) is a spa town of about 4,000 inhabitants (as of 2004) in the Bad Kreuznach district in Rhineland-Palatinate, Germany. Since 1 July 2014, it is part of the town Bad Kreuznach. It was the seat of the former like-named Verbandsgemeinde, but not part of it. Bad Münster am Stein-Ebernburg was granted town rights on 29 April 1978 and is recognized as a mineral spring spa (Mineralheilbad) and a climatic spa (heilklimatischer Kurort). Today the "Spa" is famous for its clinics specializing in cardiological and orthopaedic rehabilitation. The many graduation towers form the largest open air inhalatorium in Europe.

== Geography ==
=== Location ===
Bad Münster am Stein-Ebernburg lies between 108 and 320 m above sea level at the foot of Castle Ebernburg in a region of low mountains with forests and vineyards framed by craggy massifs of the Rheingrafenstein and the Rotenfels and also by the river Nahe. The two rock formations in question, which lie across the river, are the highest north of the Alps, rising more than 200 m from the river bank. The town lies 6 km south of Bad Kreuznach and 50 km southwest of Mainz. The municipal area measures 9.53 km^{2}. The greatest extent of graduation towers in Germany (roughly 1.4 km) stretches through the Salinental ("Saltworks Dale") from the neighbouring town of Bad Kreuznach to Bad Münster's spa zone.

=== Neighbouring municipalities ===
Clockwise from the north, Bad Münster am Stein-Ebernburg's neighbours are the municipality of Traisen, the town of Bad Kreuznach, the municipality of Altenbamberg, the municipality of Feilbingert, the municipality of Niederhausen and the municipality of Norheim.

=== Constituent communities ===
Bad Münster am Stein-Ebernburg's Stadtteile are Bad Münster am Stein and Ebernburg. They were merged into one municipality in 1969, and the new, greater municipality was raised to town in 1978.

== History ==
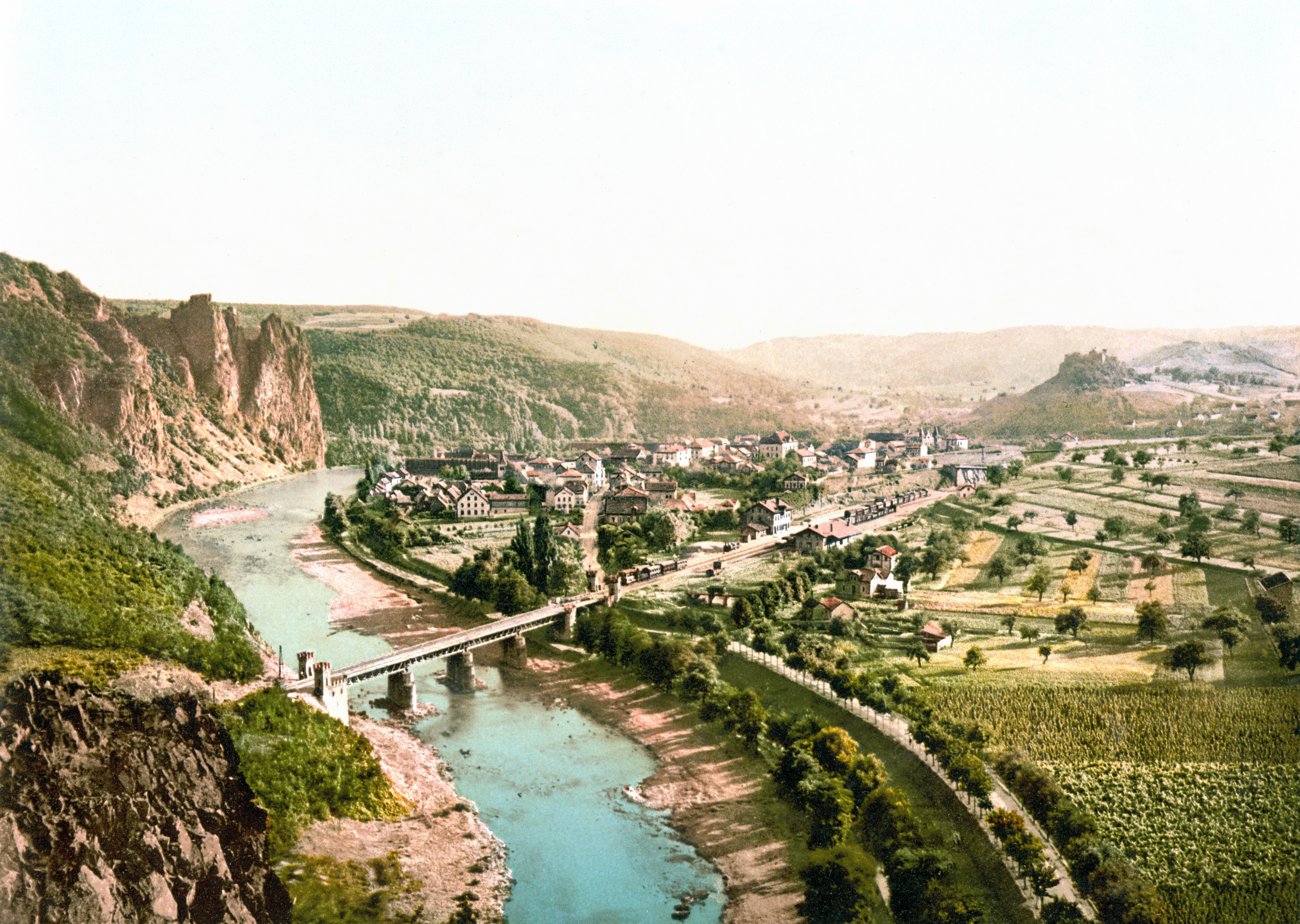
Münster am Stein about 1900

Today's town of Bad Münster am Stein-Ebernburg was newly formed on 7 June 1969 within the framework of the administrative and territorial reform begun in Rhineland-Palatinate in the late 1960s from the hitherto self-administering municipalities of Bad Münster (2,261 inhabitants) and Ebernburg (1,671 inhabitants) under the name of the municipality of "Bad Münster-Ebernburg". However, the new municipality only bore this name for a matter of months before it was changed to "Bad Münster am Stein-Ebernburg" on 1 November 1969. Town rights were granted on 29 April 1978.

While Bad Münster belonged from the Middle Ages to the Knights of Löwenstein and the Rhinegraves, and after Napoleon was driven out, to Prussia’s Rhine Province (under the terms laid out by the Congress of Vienna) from 1815 to 1945, Ebernburg belonged throughout the Middle Ages to a whole succession of lords from the Counts of Saarbrücken to the Counts of Leiningen, the Raugraves, the Counts of Sponheim, the Counts of Veldenz, Electoral Palatinate and the Lords of Sickingen before the Revolutionary, later Napoleonic, French took over. After Napoleonic times, Ebernburg belonged (again, under the terms laid out by the Congress of Vienna) to the Kingdom of Bavaria, and after the German Revolution to the Free State of Bavaria, and was that state’s northernmost municipality, lying in Bavaria’s new exclave in the Palatinate. The two constituent communities’ separate histories may no longer live on politically, but they are still reflected in ecclesiastical administration, with Bad Münster belonging to the Evangelical Church in the Rhineland and the Roman Catholic Diocese of Trier and Ebernburg on the other hand belonging to the Evangelical Church of the Palatinate and the Roman Catholic Diocese of Speyer.

=== Bad Münster am Stein ===
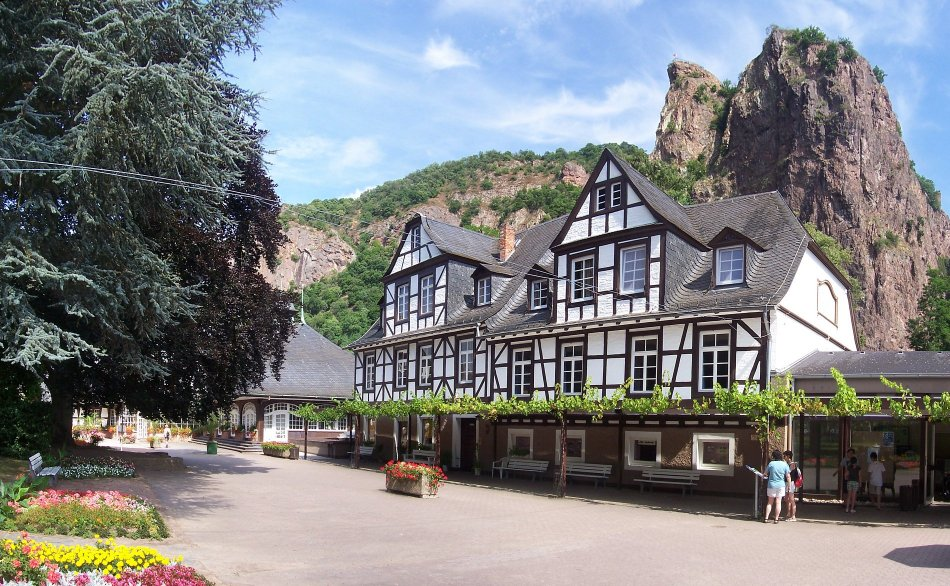
Spa house

About 1200, Münster had its first documentary mention. The village was founded below Rheingrafenstein Castle, built in 1050, which was the seat of the Count Palatine of the Rhine. The castle was destroyed in 1689 by the French, but the ruins remain. Until the 19th century it was a village with only a few houses around the old Saint Martin's Church (St.-Martins-Kirche). The people busied themselves with running saltworks, fishing on the Nahe, farming and for a time, copper mining in the Huttental (dale). In 1859, the Nahe Valley Railway (Bingen–Saarbrücken) was built, and in 1871 another railway, the Alsenz Valley Railway (Alsenztalbahn), which made it possible for the village's spa facilities, which had been established as far back as 1478, to experience a decisive upswing into a much visited spa centre, allowing the village to acquire the designation "Bad" (literally "bath") in 1905. The basis for all this is to this day the brine springs whose water contains radon. In the Second World War, the area around the railway bridge going towards the Salinental was partly destroyed in many Allied air raids. Today, Bad Münster still has a railway link, lying as it does on the Bingen–Kaiserslautern and Mainz–Saarbrücken lines. In the post-war years, the centre has undergone a thorough change in appearance owing to the expansion of the spa infrastructure.

=== Ebernburg ===
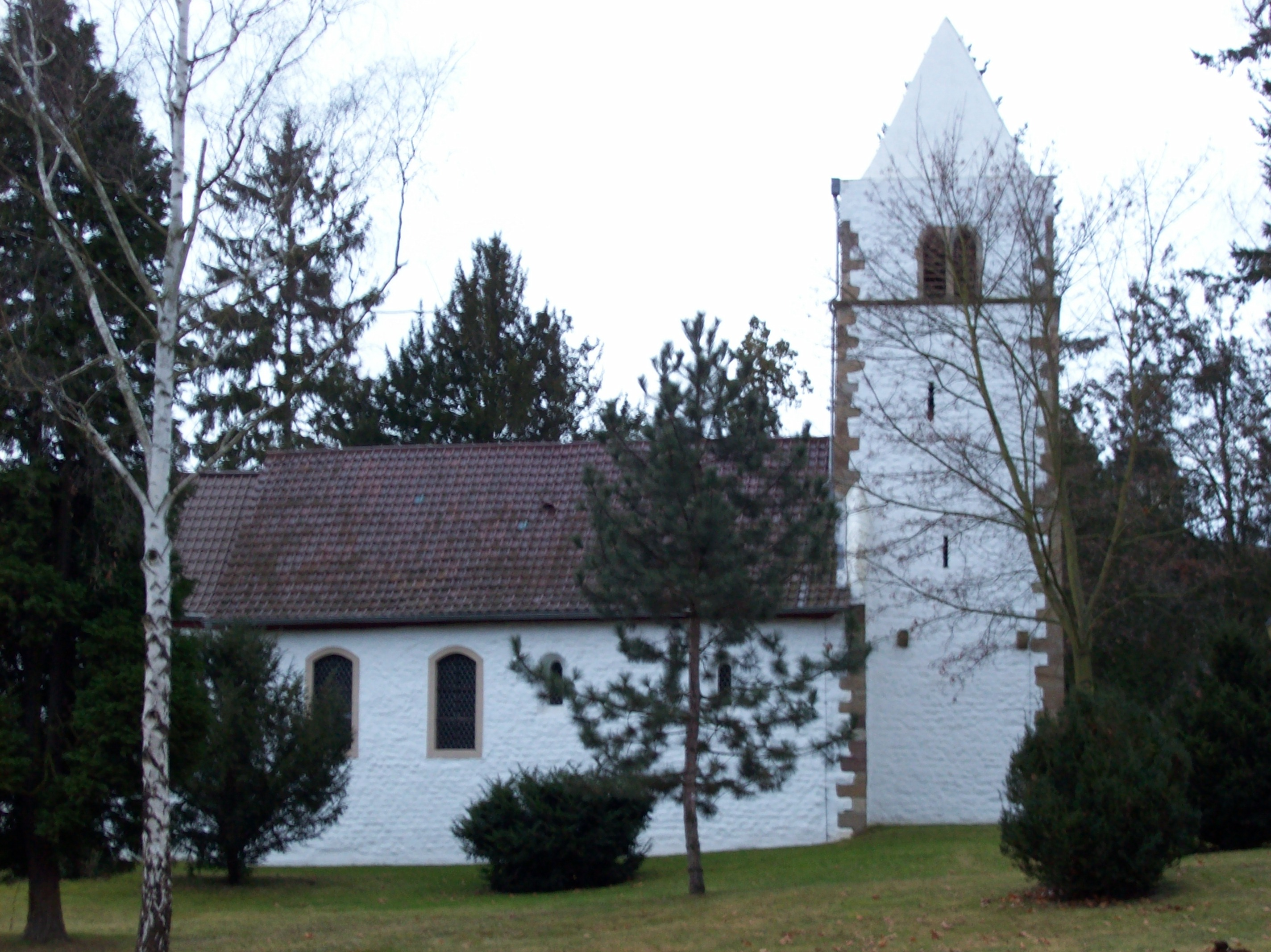
Ebernburg fortified Protestant church (Alte Johannes-Kirche)

Ebernburg was from the Middle Ages an important village with a long tradition of winegrowing and agriculture. Its first documentary mention goes back to 1212 when the Counts of Saarbrücken donated the church at Ebernburg to the Saint Cyriacus Foundation near Worms. Both the village and the like-named castle originally lay elsewhere, although it is still unknown where this was, although perhaps it was around "Old Saint John the Baptist’s Church" (Alte Johannes-Kirche). In 1338, Raugrave Ruprecht and Count Johann of Sponheim-Kreuznach took it upon themselves to build the castle and the town on the site where they still stand today. It was then even envisaged to raise Ebernburg to town, but this did not come about. The old village core, the Altdorf ("Old Village"), which can still be made out as part of the centre's appearance even now, was for centuries ringed by a wall linked to Castle Ebernburg. The castle was eventually the residence of the famous German knight Franz von Sickingen. After major expansion works at the castle beginning in 1482, the castle and the village itself were burnt down by princes who were allied against Franz von Sickingen in 1523. Reconstruction began under Franz's sons in 1542. As early as the beginning of the spa business in the late 19th century, Ebernburg underwent a quick expansion outside these walls, which is still not quite over. About the turn of the 20th century, therefore, the walls were torn down, and all that is left now is the foundation of one tower. Castle Ebernburg was partly destroyed during the Second World War but has been reconstructed since (German Link). For the past 40 years it has been in use as an adult and youth education centre (German Link).

== Religion ==
As at 31 August 2013, there are 4,033 full-time residents in Bad Münster am Stein-Ebernburg, and of those, 1,582 are Evangelical (39.226%), 1,249 are Catholic (30.97%), 10 are Greek Orthodox (0.248%), 6 are Russian Orthodox (0.149%), 2 are Lutheran (0.05%), 1 belongs to the Palatinate State Free Religious Community (0.025%), 2 belong to the Bad Kreuznach-Koblenz Jewish worship community, 163 (4.042%) belong to other religious groups and 1,018 (25.242%) either have no religion or will not reveal their religious affiliation.

== Politics ==
=== Town council ===
The former council was made up of 20 council members, who were elected by proportional representation at the municipal election held on 7 June 2009, and the honorary mayor as chairwoman. It was incorporated into Bad Kreuznach on 1 July 2014.

The municipal election held on 7 June 2009 yielded the following results:

2009	SPD	CDU	FDP	FWG	Total
Seats	6	10	2	2	20
Change from 2004	-3	+3	=	=
Vote (%)	31.3	48.0	9.5	11.1	100
Change from 2004	-10.7	+11.3	+1.9	-2.6

Voter turnout at the 2009 elections was 51.1%. Owing to the peculiarities in the Rhineland-Palatinate electoral system as it pertains to municipal elections (personalized proportional representation), the percentages given in the table above are presented as "weighted results", which can only reflect the voting relations arithmetically.

=== Coat of arms ===
The German blazon reads: In Schwarz mit eingeschweifter silberner Spitze, darin ein wachsender konischer roter Rundturm mit vorkragendem vierzinnigem Kranz und zwei schwarzen Scharten, vorne fünf silberne Kugeln 2:1:2 gestellt, hinten ein steigender goldbekronter und rotbezungter silberner Löwe.

The town's arms might in English heraldic language be described thus: Tierced in mantle dexter sable five roundles in saltire argent, sinister sable a lion rampant of the second crowned Or and langued gules, issuant from base argent a tower embattled gules with two arrowslits in pale of the first.

The quincunx and the tower were both charges found in Ebernburg's coat of arms before the 1969 amalgamation, the former being an heraldic device once borne by the Lords of Sickingen, who once held the local area, and the latter being a representation of the local Castle Ebernburg, which was also held by the Lords of Sickingen. The lion seems to have been drawn from Bad Münster's pre-amalgamation arms and was an heraldic device once borne by the Lords of Löwenstein ("Lion Stone"), who held Münster for several centuries. Both the current centres that make up Bad Münster am Stein-Ebernburg had their own arms before amalgamation. Ebernburg's arms had a "tierced in mantle" division of the field like the combined town's (that is, somewhat resembling a parted coat), but the dexter (armsbearer's right, viewer's left) and sinister (armsbearer's left, viewer's right) sides were of different tinctures, with the sinister side in argent (silver). Furthermore, before this official coat of arms was granted in 1967, Ebernburg had borne an unofficial coat of arms with a gold field and the figure of Saint Cyriacus. Bad Münster's old arms featured a lion rampant in the same tinctures as the lion in the current arms, including the field tincture, but the lion held a fish in each paw, a canting charge for the Counts of Salm-Salm (Salm being one word in German for "salmon") who had descended from the Lords of Stein and held "Münster unter Rheingrafenstein" in the 14th century. The arms were also semé of five crosses crosslet (crosses whose ends are also crossed).

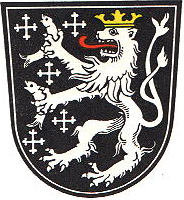
Bad Münster's former arms

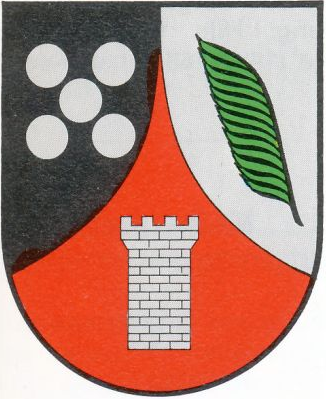
Ebernburg's former official arms

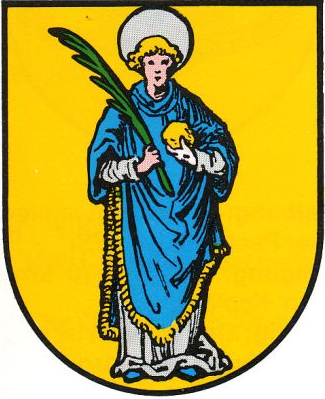
Ebernburg's former unofficial arms

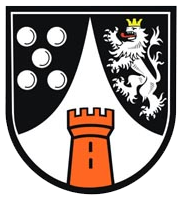
Merged town's current arms

=== Town partnerships ===
Bad Münster am Stein-Ebernburg fosters partnerships with the following places:

- Pouilly-sur-Loire, Nièvre, France since 1968
- (Germany) Landstuhl, Kaiserslautern district, Rhineland-Palatinate since 1998

== Culture and sightseeing ==
=== Buildings ===
The following are listed buildings or sites in Rhineland-Palatinate’s Directory of Cultural Monuments:

==== Bad Münster am Stein ====
- Evangelical church, Berliner Straße 21 –basilica with engaged columns in Hohenstaufen forms, 1907/1908, architect Otto Kuhlmann, Berlin; after wartime destruction reconstructed by 1961; architectural sculpture by Lehmann-Borges, Berlin; glass window by Erhard Klonk, Marburg; warriors’ memorial 1914-1918, artificial-stone stele with relief, 1920s
- Catholic Parish Church of the Assumption of Mary (Pfarrkirche Maria Himmelfahrt), Rotenfelser Straße 10 – Gothic Revival aisleless church, 1900, architect Ludwig Becker
- Town centre (monumental zone), Nahestraße 7–23 (odd numbers), 4–26 (even numbers) – core of settlement with buildings from the 17th to 20th centuries, mainly of two-floor construction from the 18th and 19th century
- Berliner Straße 20 – railway station; one-floor buildings with hip roofs, partly timber-frame, Art Nouveau, about 1900
- Berliner Straße 23 – former post office; Late Gründerzeit building with hip roof, about 1900
- Berliner Straße 32 – Late Gründerzeit house, about 1900
- Fischerhof 5 – one-floor building with mansard roof, essentially possibly from the 16th century, made over in Baroque in the 18th century
- Goetheplatz – "Peace Oak" (Friedenseiche) and monument, sandstone, marked 1872–1912
- Goetheplatz 4/6 – former spa house (Kurhaus); three-floor Late Classicist plastered building, third fourth of the 19th century
- Kapitän-Lorenz-Ufer 2 – so-called Fischerhäuschen ("Fishermen’s Hut"); possibly from the late 16th century
- Kurhausstraße, Kurpark ("Spa Park"; monumental zone) – laid out in the 19th century in a bow on the River Nahe below Rheingrafenstein Castle with a bathhouse and a spa treatment house, former saltworks administration building, graduation towers, Gründerzeit concert stage, about 1880; bronze figure, possibly from the 1930s, watertower
- Kurhausstraße 1/3 – two-part Late Classicist shophouse, late 19th century or about 1900
- Kurhausstraße 5 – Baroque timber-frame house, plastered and slated, 17th/18th century
- Kurhausstraße 14 – Villa Schöneck; Late Historicist building, partly timber-frame, Art Nouveau influence, about 1905
- At Kurhausstraße 25 – bathhouse and spa treatment house; two- or three-floor timber-frame buildings, Baroquified Art Nouveau, 1911, architect Robert Muehlbach, Freiburg, with collaboration from Ackermann
- At Kurhausstraße 25 – former saltworks administration building; two-part Late Baroque timber-frame building, marked 1781
- At Kurhausstraße 25 – watertower, standing between the bathhouse and the Nahe, eight-sided timber-frame construction, possibly from the late 19th century
- Kurhausstraße 41 – villa; building with mansard roof, clinker brick, Renaissance Revival, about 1890
- Lindenallee 3 – former Hotel Central; three-floor Late Gründerzeit building, about 1900
- Lindenallee 11 – inn/pension; Late Classicist building, about 1870
- Nahestraße 10 – timber-frame house, 1777 (?), heavily restored
- Nahestraße 21 – tower of the former Evangelical church (formerly Saint Martin's), mentioned in 1435, preserved, since 1911 stair tower of the Evangelical community hall, Heimatstil; in the gateway arch a volute stone, 18th century; gravestone, 1784; Early Classicist monumental stone; Baroque gravestone fragment
- Nahestraße 23 – Haus Berlin; Late Classicist house, third fourth of the 19th century
- Nahestraße 24 – Baroque timber-frame house, partly solid, mid 18th century
- Nahestraße 28 – so-called Fischerhäuschen ("Fishermen’s Hut"), timber-frame bungalow with high pedestal, possibly from the late 16th century, gateway complex, 18th or early 19th century
- Naheweinstraße 6 – stately villa, Heimatstil, about 1900/1910
- Rheingrafenstein Castle ruin, southeast of town – about 1050, blown up in 1688, from 1721 a quarry, development 1978–1982
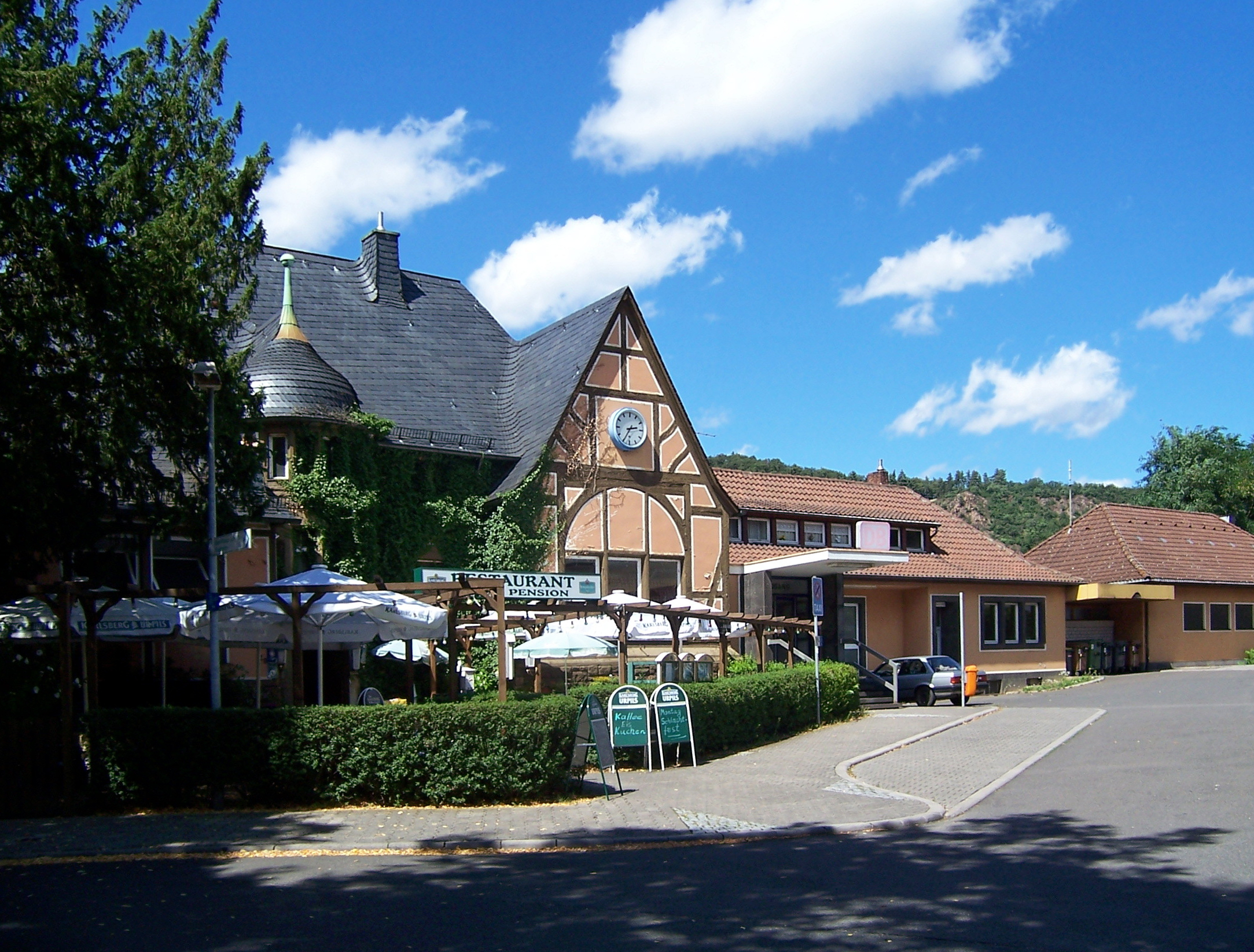
Berliner Straße 20: railway station

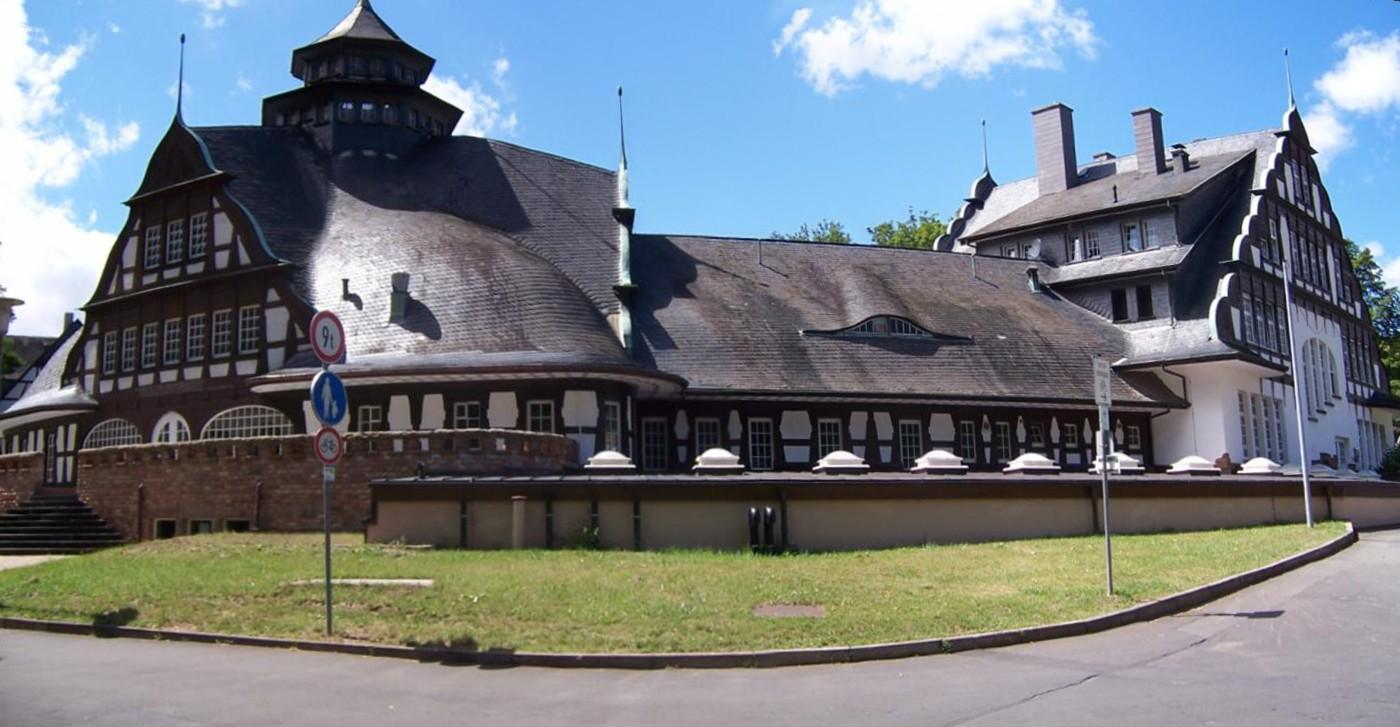
Kurhausstraße 25: bathhouse and spa treatment house

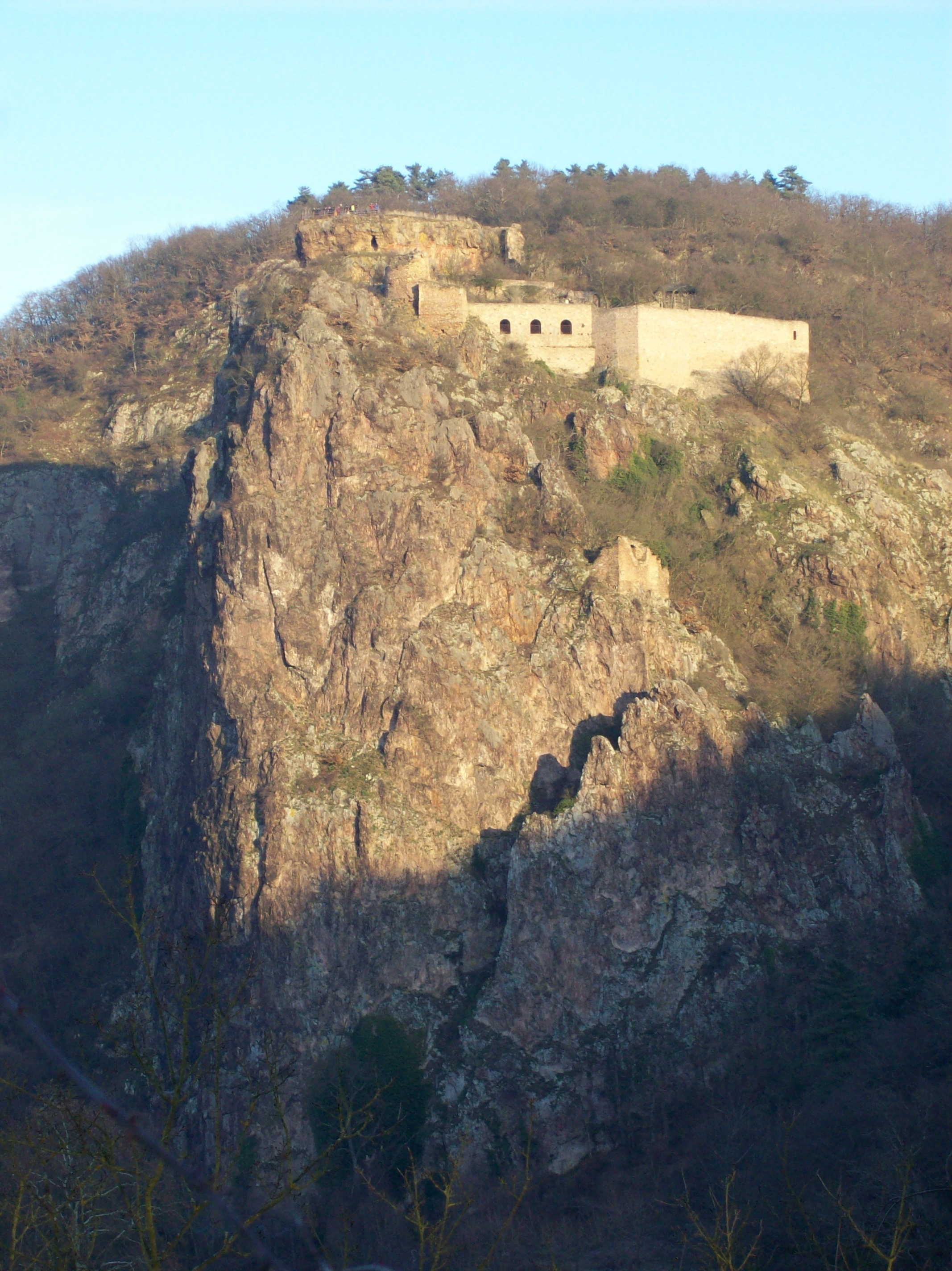
Rheingrafenstein Castle ruin

==== Ebernburg ====
- Saint John the Baptist's Catholic Parish Church (Pfarrkirche St. Johannes der Täufer), Schloßgartenstraße – aisleless church, Heimatstil with Art Nouveau motifs, 1915–1918, architects Karl Marschall, Göllheim, and August Greifzu, Ludwigshafen; nearby the rectory, 1916–1918
- Protestant church, Friedhofstraße 5 – Alte Johannes-Kirche ("Old Saint John the Baptist’s Church"), essentially thought to be a Romanesque aisleless church, 12th century, west tower latter half of the 13th century; in the churchyard Baroque gravestones, 17th, 18th and 19th centuries, warriors’ memorial 1914-1918 and 1939-1945
- Berliner Straße 77 – former railway station, so-called Künstlerbahnhof ("Artists’ Station"), Late Classicist sandstone-block building, about 1880
- Burgstraße 1 – Late Baroque estate complex, marked 1780
- Burgstraße 2 – Baroque house, 18th century
- Burgstraße 9 – former Catholic rectory; Late Baroque solid building, 1776
- Burgstraße 13 – former Amtshaus; four-wing complex; Renaissance timber-frame building, plastered, marked 1556, alterations in the 19th century (see also below)
- At Burgstraße 16 – spolia, two Baroque reliefs, cartouche marked 1743
- At Burgstraße 19 – relief stone, marked 1561
- Franz-von-Sickingen-Straße 4 – estate complex, 18th century; Baroque timber-frame house, plastered, barn, partly timber-frame
- Franz-von-Sickingen-Straße 5 – Baroque timber-frame house, plastered, 1719
- Friedhofstraße, at the graveyard – Günther Franz's tomb, decorative façade, 1917; Hermann Müller's tomb, sandstone, 1897
- Schloßgartenstraße – wayside cross, Baroque, 18th century
- Schloßgartenstraße 30 – former school (?); Late Classicist building with hip roof, mid 19th century
- Turmstraße 5 – Baroque timber-frame house, partly solid, 17th century
- Below the Ebernburg – double monument; 1886–1889, sculptor Ludwig Cauer after Carl Cauer's design
- Ebernburg – castle, mentioned in 1209, beginning in 1482 expansion into modern fortress, burnt to ashes in 1523, after 1542 reconstruction, largely torn down in 1697; Hohenstaufen shielding wall remnants, buildings from the late 15th and 16th centuries, remnants of a dwelling building, marked 1581, Gothic Revival Haus Sickingen, 1840
- Ebernburger Mühle, south of town on the Alsenz – former estate mill, mentioned in 1438, four-wing complex; two-and-a-half-floor house, marked 1871, upon older cellars; gateway arch marked 1584; barns, partly timber-frame
- former Alsenz Valley Railway (Alsenztalbahn) signal box, south of town – building with hip roof, slate quarrystone, about 1904/1908
- Trombacher Hof, southwest of town – Late Baroque timber-frame house, marked 1798; in the barn building walls and gables of the Gothic church
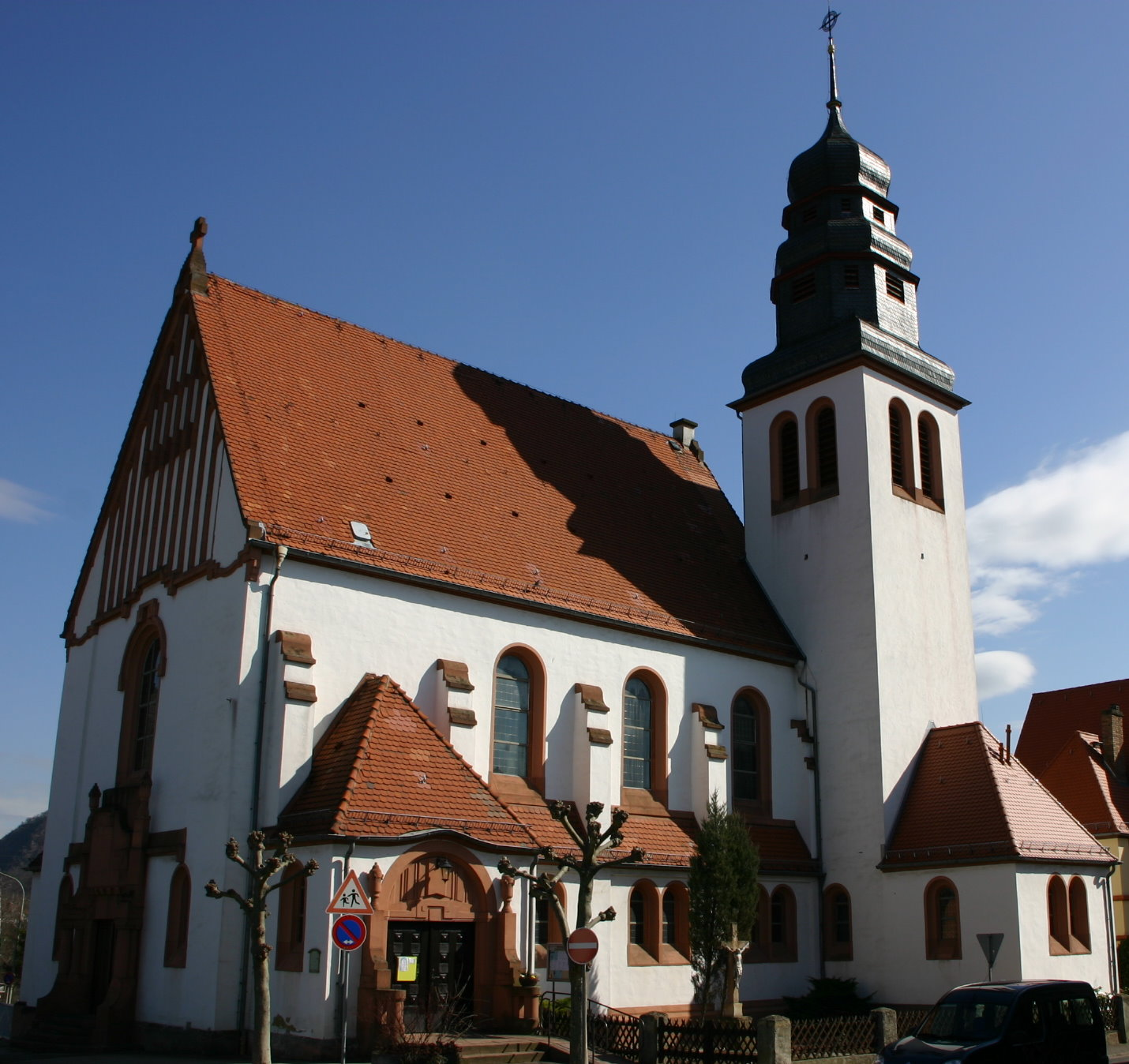
Schloßgartenstraße: Saint John the Baptist's Parish Church

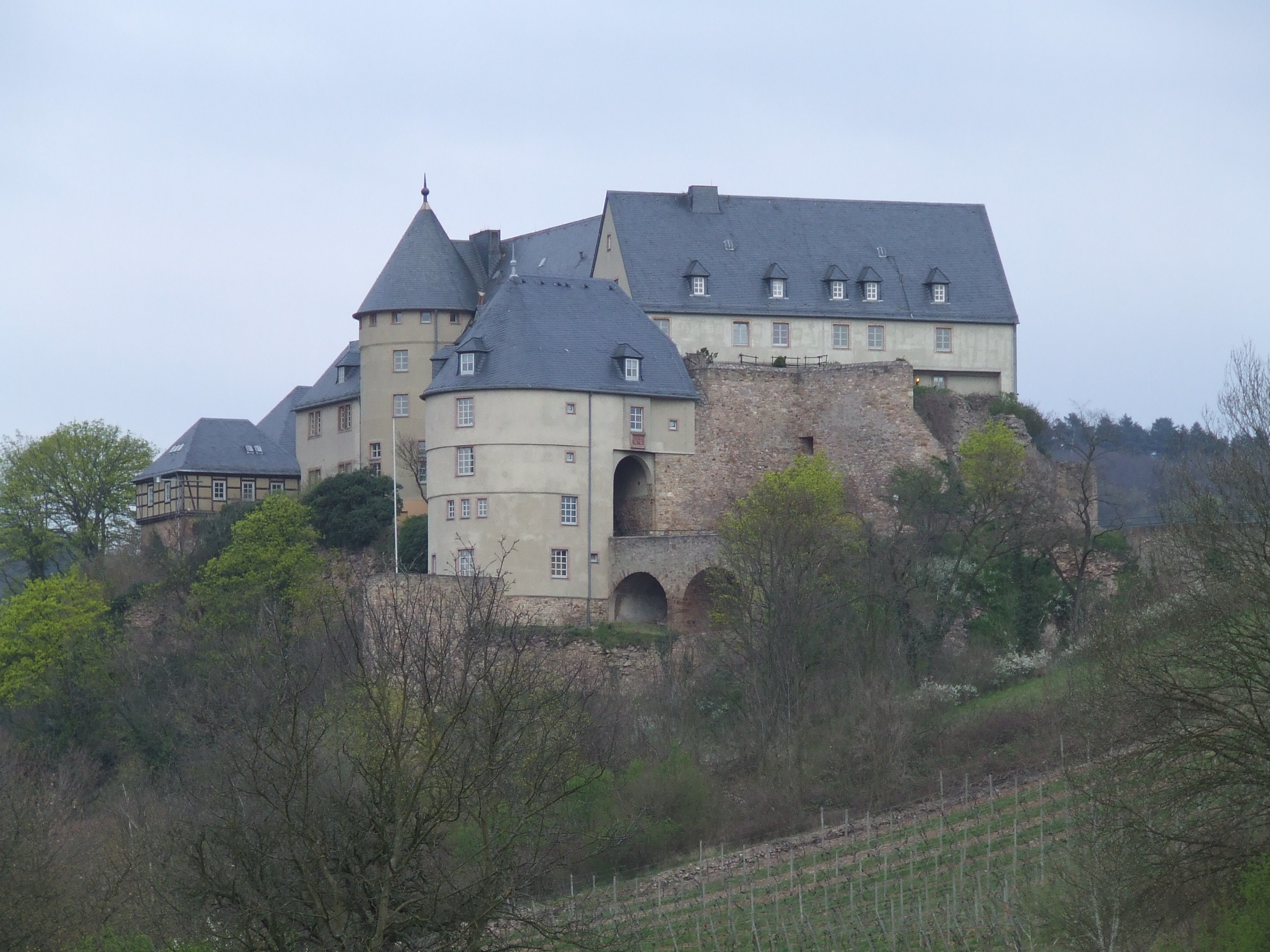
Castle Ebernburg

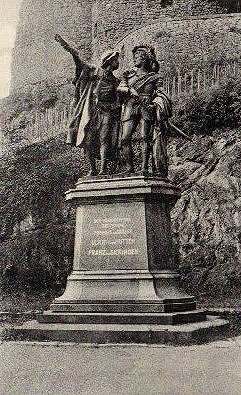
Below the Ebernburg: double monument

=== More about buildings ===
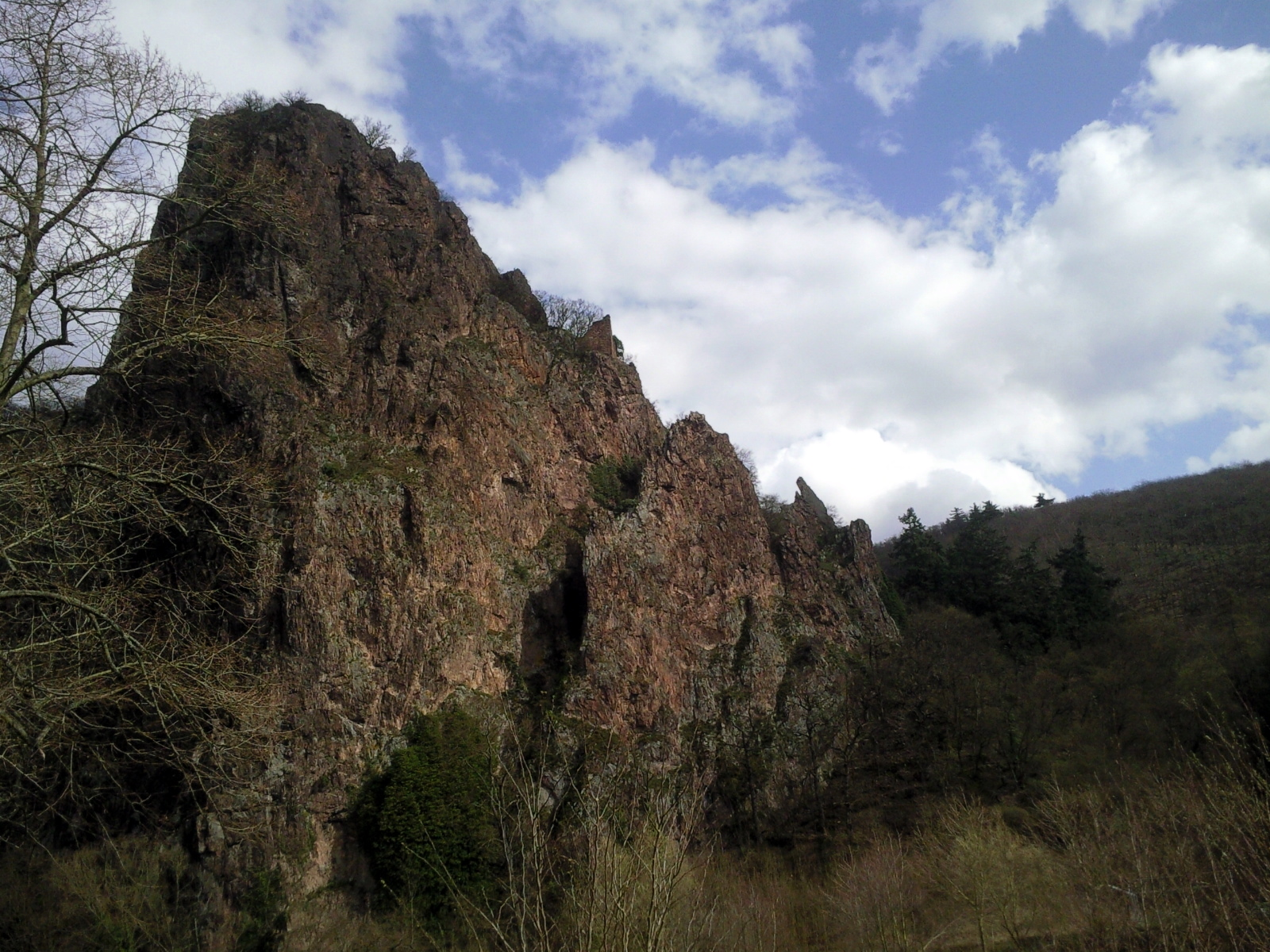
The Rheingrafenstein

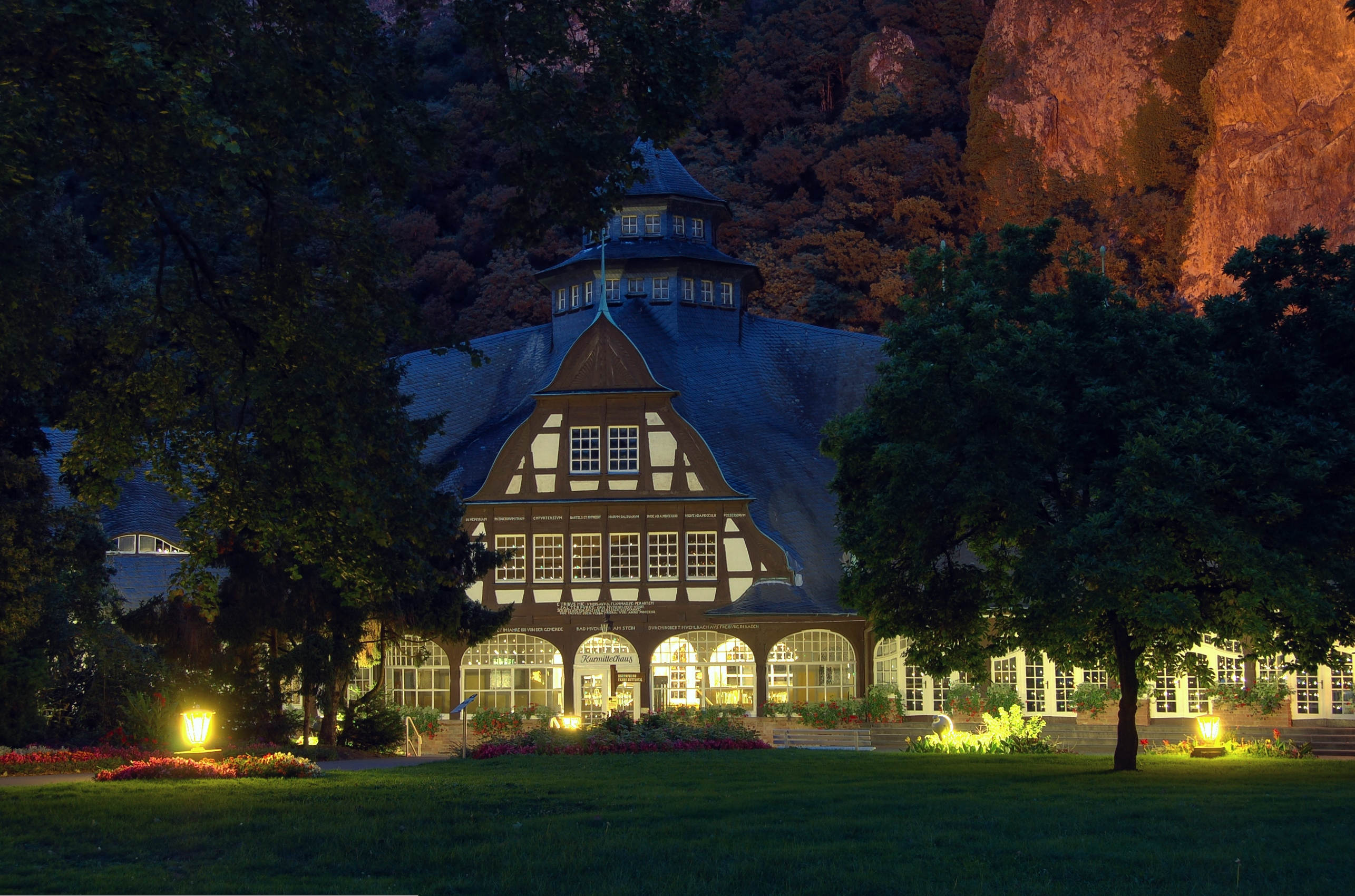
The Kurmittelhaus at the Bad Münster am Stein spa park at night

Among the town's sights are the rock formations known as the Rotenfels and the Rheingrafenstein, the latter of which bears a crag which itself bears the castle of the same name right on the river Nahe. There is also another castle, the Ebernburg.

There is evidence that the graduation towers used for producing salt in Bad Münster am Stein already had their current form as far back as 1729. The weakly salty water from the salt spring is delivered to the graduation towers by pumps formerly driven by waterwheels, but now driven by electricity. From the top, the water trickles down in innumerable drops through walls of blackthorn to a collection basin, while the air in the area is enriched with salty material such as iodine, bromine and strontium ions as well as the noble gas radon. By making the water into mist during its trickling through to the collection basin, the water's saltiness is raised. The waterwheels and part of the equipment (rods for transmitting the motion) can still be viewed.

The town's oldest secular building is the former Electoral Palatinate Unteramt at Burgstraße 13. Into the lintel of the Renaissance part, the year 1556 has been chiselled. Investigations of this part of the building have also brought to light that there are mediaeval wall remnants underneath the Renaissance walls.

Said to be Bad Münster's oldest property is the "Hahnenhof", first mentioned in 1560, a former Rhinegravial manor. The narrow so-called Zehntscheune ("tithe barn") with a timber-frame upper floor was in its time the financial office for tithes paid in kind.

The Kurmittelhaus (roughly "spa treatment house") in the Kurpark (spa park), built in 1911 in an Art Nouveau style with Nordic characteristics, is said to be one of the region's loveliest timber-frame buildings. It contains the spring hall with the two healing springs, the Maximilianquelle and the Rheingrafenquelle, which rise up through three glass pipes.

=== Museums ===
Housed in the former local history museum's rooms at the Kurmittelhaus is the Naturstation Nahe where in the warmer months animals from the region can be observed, in particular the dice snake, which is indigenous to the river Nahe.

=== Regular events ===
Among special events in Bad Münster am Stein-Ebernburg are the "mediaeval" Ebernburger Markt (market) on the third weekend in September and the Christmas Market in the spa park.

== Economy and infrastructure ==
=== Economic structure ===
Spa guests were in bygone decades an important source of income for Bad Münster am Stein-Ebernburg. After a few years in which the spa industry shrank greatly, the numbers of guests are now slowly rising once again. Most commercial enterprises in the town nowadays are tourism operations (lodging, inns) and winegrowing estates. There is moreover a cork wire factory where closure wire is made for sekt and champagne bottles.

=== Transport ===
Bad Münster am Stein-Ebernburg lies on the Nahe Valley Railway (Bingen–Saarbrücken). At Bad Münster am Stein station, the Alsenz Valley Railway (Alsenztalbahn) branches of towards Kaiserslautern. The town lies within the area to which the Rhein-Nahe-Nahverkehrsverbund ("Rhine-Nahe Local Transport Association") applies. Bad Münster am Stein-Ebernburg can be reached by car on Bundesstraße 48 and on Landesstraßen 235 and 379.

== Famous people ==
=== Honorary citizens ===
- Max Kuna (d. 1989)

=== Sons and daughters of the town ===
- Franz von Sickingen (b. 1481 at Castle Ebernburg; d. 1523), Amtmann at Castle Ebernburg, now and then bore the byname Letzter Ritter ("Last Knight"); promoter of Protestantism.
- Heinrich Lorenz (1898–1966), born at Haus Lorenz, captain of the biggest German passenger ship Bremen; winner of the Blue Band for the fastest transatlantic crossing.

=== Famous people associated with the town ===
- J. M. W. Turner (1775–1851), painted several watercolours of the mountains and castle when he visited the area in 1844.
- Rudolf Eickemeyer, (1831–1895), born in Altenbamberg, noted inventor with several innovations to hat manufacturing, patent for first symmetrical drum armature and iron-clad dynamo, and first employer of Charles Proteus Steinmetz.
- Heinrich Georg Rung (1854–1931), worked for 43 years as the Pastor of Ebernburg; local historian, co-founder and chairman of the North Palatine History Club (Nordpfälzer Geschichtsverein).
- Anna Kubach-Wilmsen (1937–2021) and Wolfgang Kubach (1936–2007), sculptors
- Livia Kubach (b. 1966), sculptor
- Ulrike Piechota (b. 1942), writer
- Sigune von Osten (b. 1950), singer and music professor
