= Ebernburg Castle =

Castle in Rhineland Palatinate, Germany

- Burg Ebernburg (German)
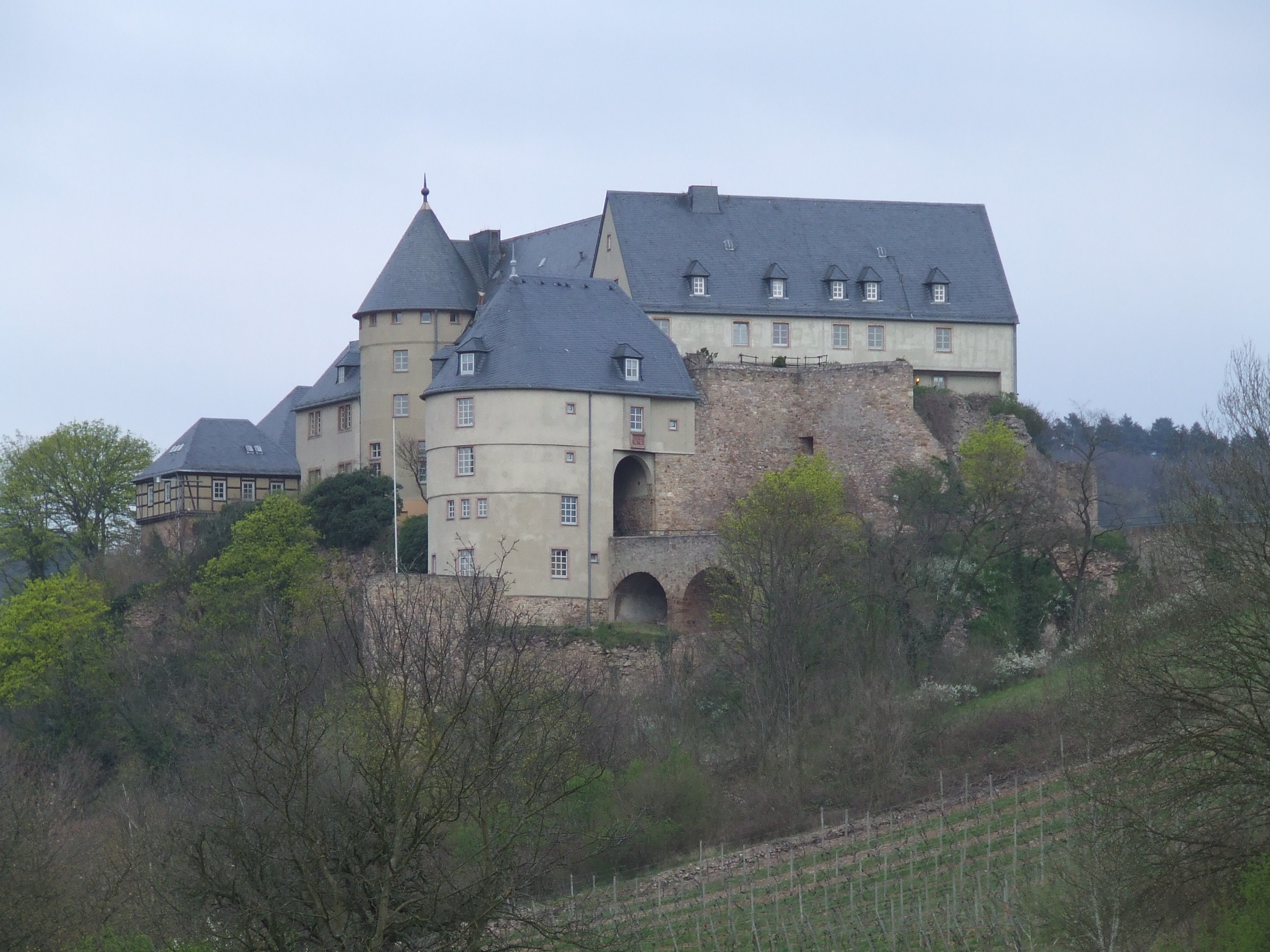
- Ebernburg Castle in 2007

- Location within Germany

General information
- Type: Castle
- Location: Bad Münster am Stein-Ebernburg, Germany
- Coordinates: 49°48′25.4″N 7°50′19″E
- Completed: 1338 (688 years ago)
- Affiliation: House of Sickingen

Ebernburg Castle (German: Burg Ebernburg; French: Ebrebourg) is a hilltop castle above the town of Bad Münster am Stein-Ebernburg in Rhineland-Palatinate, Germany. Ebernburg Castle gives its name to the Ebernburg district of the town of Bad Kreuznach (Rhineland-Palatinate).

== Geographical Location ==
Ebernburg Castle stands on a mountain spur above the Nahe valley at an elevation of about 607 ft (185 m) above sea level on the southeastern edge of the district of the same name.[1]

== History ==
An initial hilltop castle and settlement may have originally existed at a different location, namely in the area around the Protestant Old St. John's Church (the so-called fortified church) in Ebernburg.

The first documented mention of the name "Ebernburc" dates back to 1206, although according to Böcher, it is unclear whether the mention refers to the castle or the village. Böcher considers it unlikely, however, that the village is older than the castle. In 1338 – this much is certain – Count Ruprecht and Count Johann of Sponheim-Kreuznach built the castle.

In 1448, the entire Ebernburg estate came into the possession of the Sickingen family as a pledge, later as a fief, which they only ceded back to the Electorate of the Palatinate in 1750 and 1771. Under Schweickhardt von Sickingen and his son Franz, the castle was expanded and armed with artillery in 1482; in particular, it housed several heavy cannons, the Scharfmetzen.

Ebernburg Castle received the epithet "Hostel of Justice" from the humanist Ulrich von Hutten, a friend of Franz von Sickingen, in a polemical essay on the papal bull Exsurge Domine, which Pope Leo X had issued against the reformer Martin Luther.[2] This was an indirect reference to the fact that Franz von Sickingen had offered Luther asylum at Ebernburg Castle when Luther was on his way to the Diet of Worms (1521). Luther, however, did not accept the offer. Declared an outlaw by the Diet of Worms on May 16, 1521, he fled to Wartburg Castle under the alias Junker Jörg. Other reformers, who were also persecuted as followers of Luther or had lost their positions, accepted Sickingen's offer. These were:

Martin Bucer John Oecolampadius Johann Schwebel Caspar Aquila

John Oecolampadius stayed at Ebernburg Castle in the summer of 1522. As the castle chaplain, he reformed the church service there. In June, he began reading the text of the Gospels and Epistles in German, rather than Latin, during the daily Mass. Although he did not omit any of the customary ceremonies, the innovation caused a stir, and the archiepiscopal authorities in Mainz demanded an explanation from him. Also in June, communion was celebrated at Ebernburg Castle under both kinds (bread and wine). “Thus, the service at Ebernburg became the first Protestant service.”[3] In November 1522, Oecolampadius went to Basel, where he found a new place of work.

In 1842, Ferdinand Freiligrath wrote his defiant poem "Ein Denkmal" (A Monument), which invoked Ulrich von Hutten's chivalric image and proclaimed: "O Germany, your great ones..."

After Franz von Sickingen's death in 1523 during the Trier Feud, which he had initiated, the castle was burned down, but rebuilt in 1542. At the beginning of the War of the Palatine Succession, French troops occupied the castle. Imperial soldiers under the command of the Margrave of Baden recaptured it on September 27, 1697, after a first unsuccessful siege in 1692.[4] It was then demolished once again and used as a quarry in the following years; spolia can be found in buildings in the surrounding area.

In 1838, the castle came into the possession of the landowner and mayor of Feilbingert, Karl Günther, who had it rebuilt in its original style and constructed a residence, farm buildings, and an inn. From 1849 onward, it also served as a popular destination for excursions. In 1914, the Günther family sold the castle, along with all its contents, to the Ebernburg Foundation, which had been established for this purpose. The foundation then leased the castle to the Ebernburg Association. The purchase was made possible primarily through a donation from the leather manufacturer and Privy Councillor Theodor Wilhelm Simon (1861–1940) from Kirn.

Below the castle stands the Hutten-Sickingen Monument, a bronze sculpture in the Historicist style, created in 1889 by the sculptor Karl Cauer from Bad Kreuznach and executed by his sons Robert and Ludwig. It depicts Ulrich von Hutten and Franz von Sickingen.

After the Second World War, the castle was expanded into its present form.

Built in 1338, it was the ancestral seat of the lords of Sickingen, and the birthplace of Franz von Sickingen, the famous landsknecht captain and protector of Ulrich von Hutten, to whom a monument was erected on the slope near the castle ruins in 1889.
