= Graduation tower =

Structure used in the production of salt

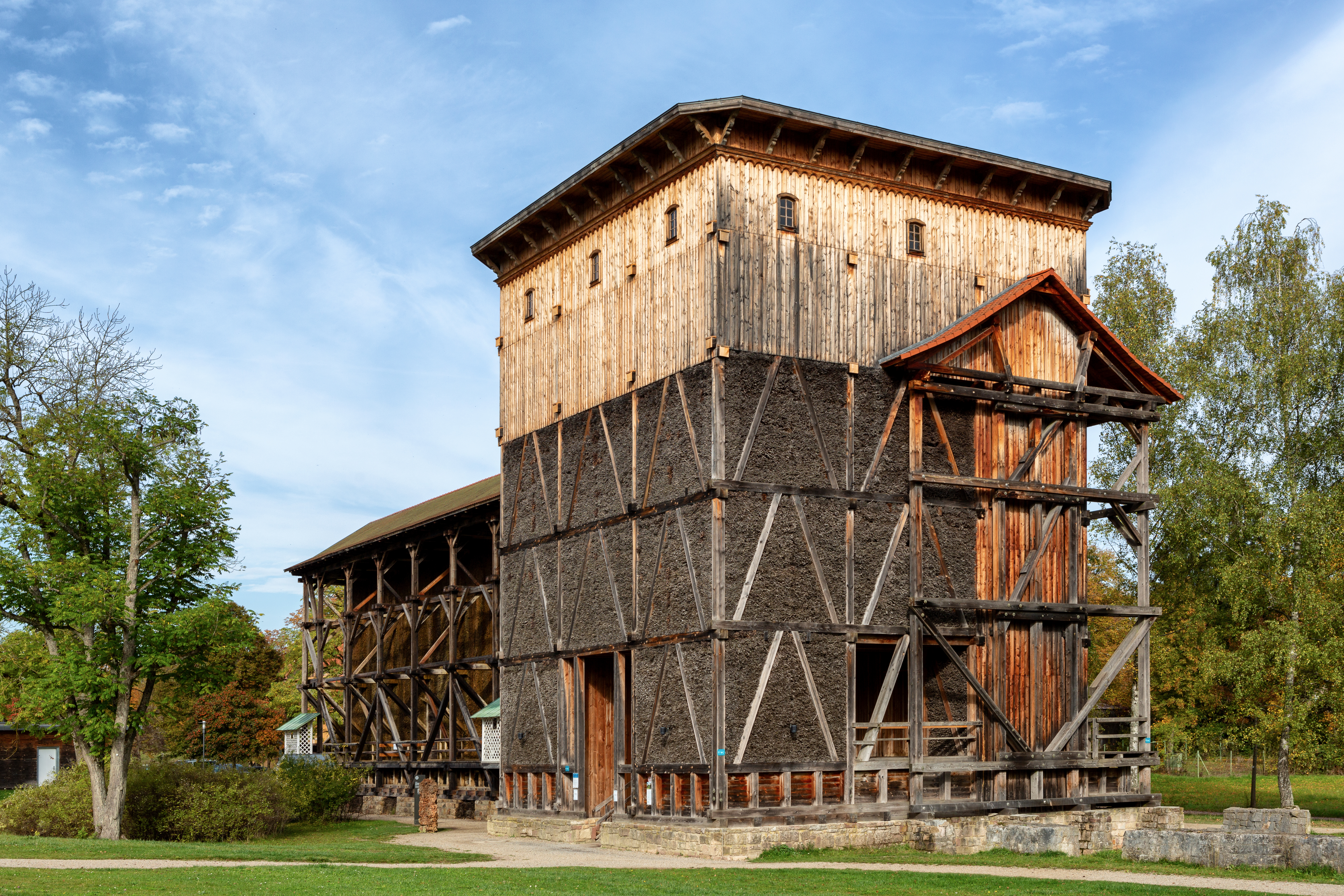
Bad Kissingen, Germany

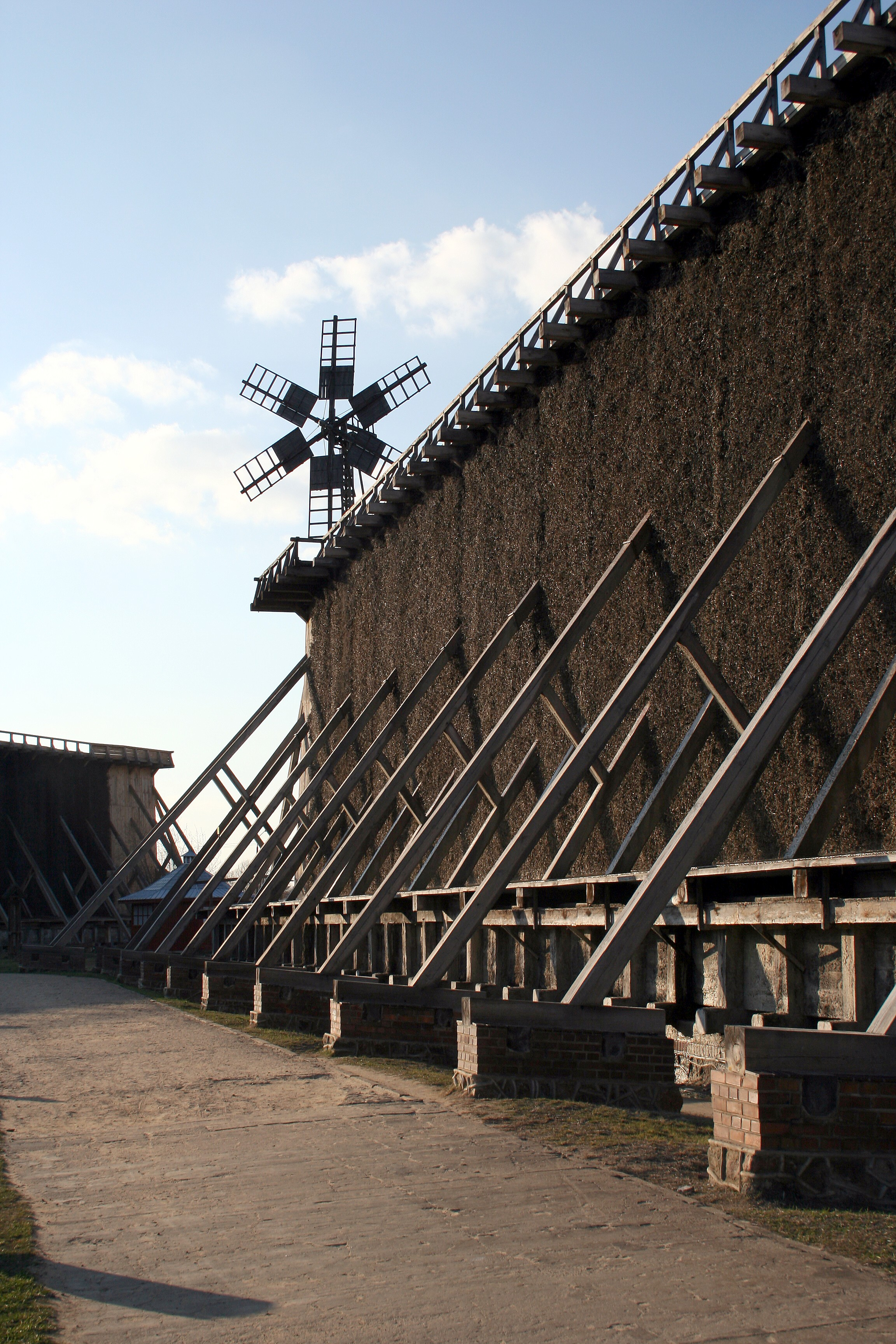
Ciechocinek, Poland

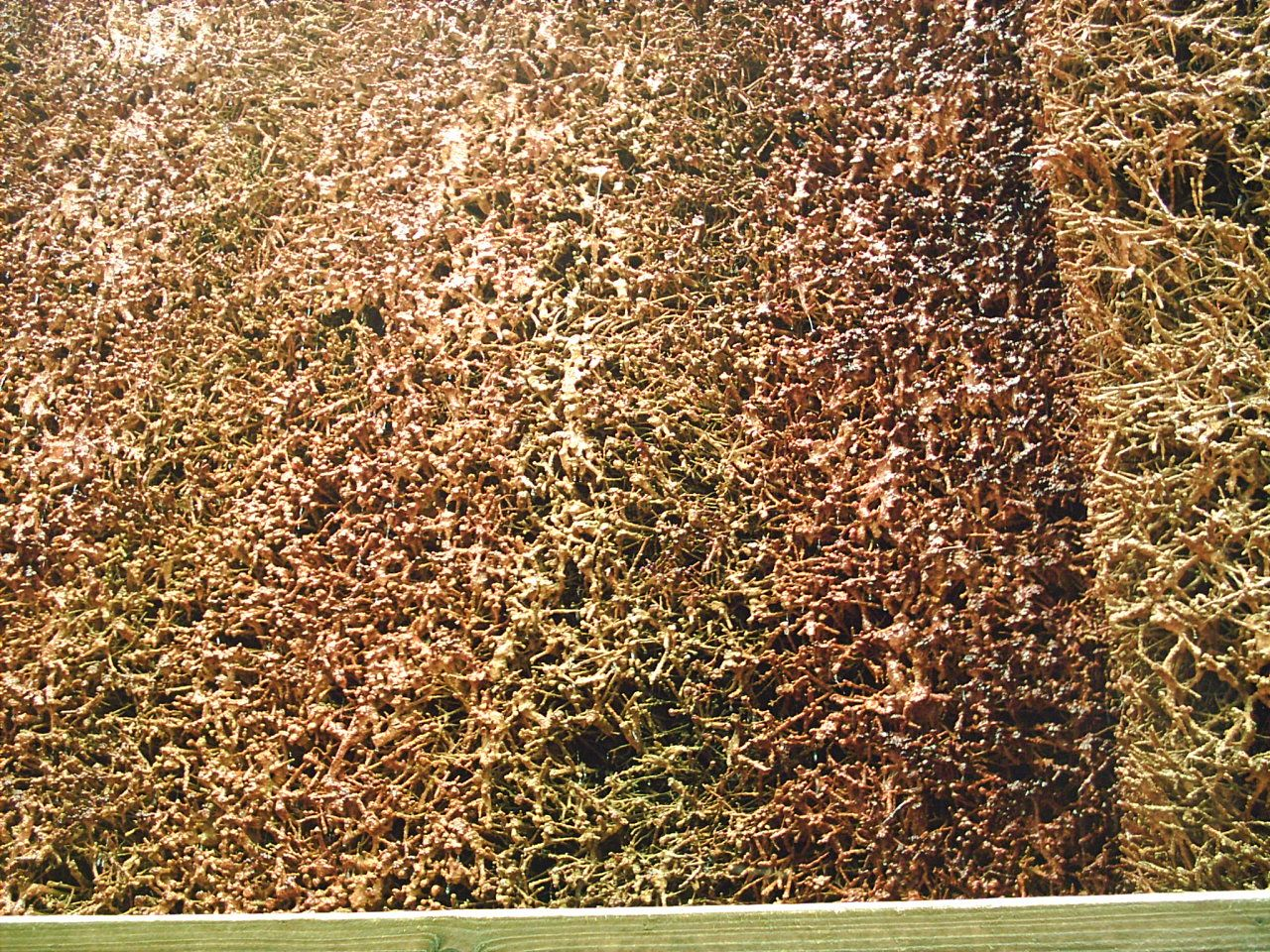
Close-up view of brushwood with mineral deposits

A graduation tower (occasionally referred to as a thorn house) is a structure, used in the production of salt, that removes water from a saline solution by evaporation, increasing its concentration of mineral salts. The tower consists of a wooden wall-like frame stuffed with bundles of brushwood (typically blackthorn) that have to be changed every five to ten years, as they become encrusted with mineral deposits over time. The salt water runs down the tower and partly evaporates. At the same time, some minerals from the solution are left behind on the brushwood twigs.

Graduation towers can be found in a number of spa towns, primarily in Germany but also Poland and Austria. The mineral-rich water droplets in the air are regarded as having beneficial health effects similar to that of breathing in sea air.

Large graduation tower complexes are located in Ciechocinek and Inowrocław, Poland. Ciechocinek's entirely wooden construction was erected in the 19th century by Stanisław Staszic. The complex consists of three towers, with a total length of over 2 km. Many tourists visit it for health reasons.

== Gallery ==
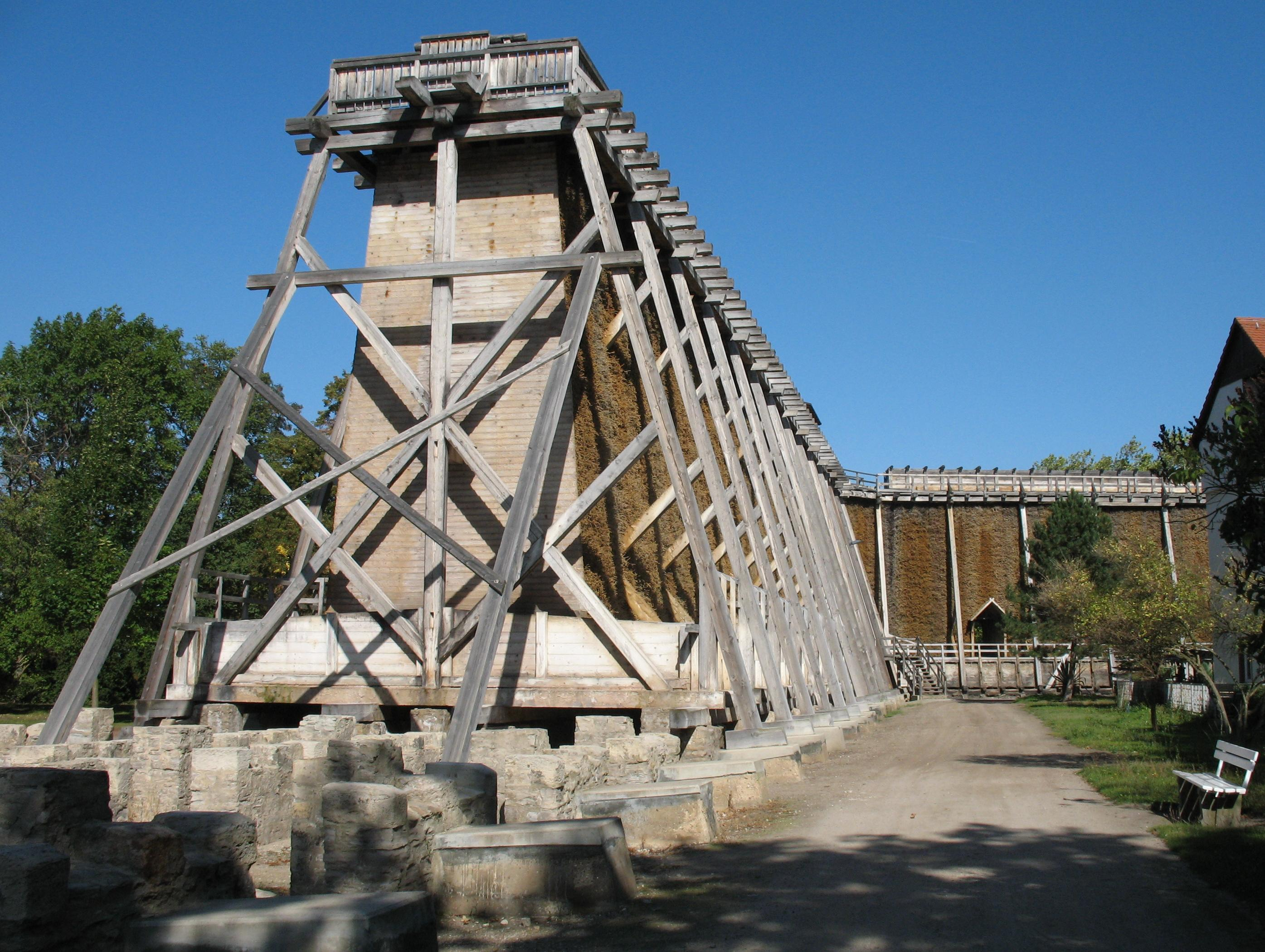
Graduation tower in Bad Dürrenberg

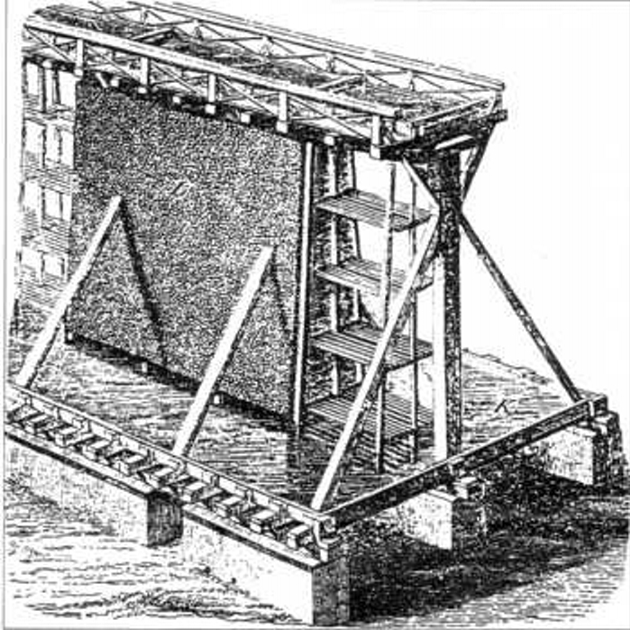
18th-century schematic

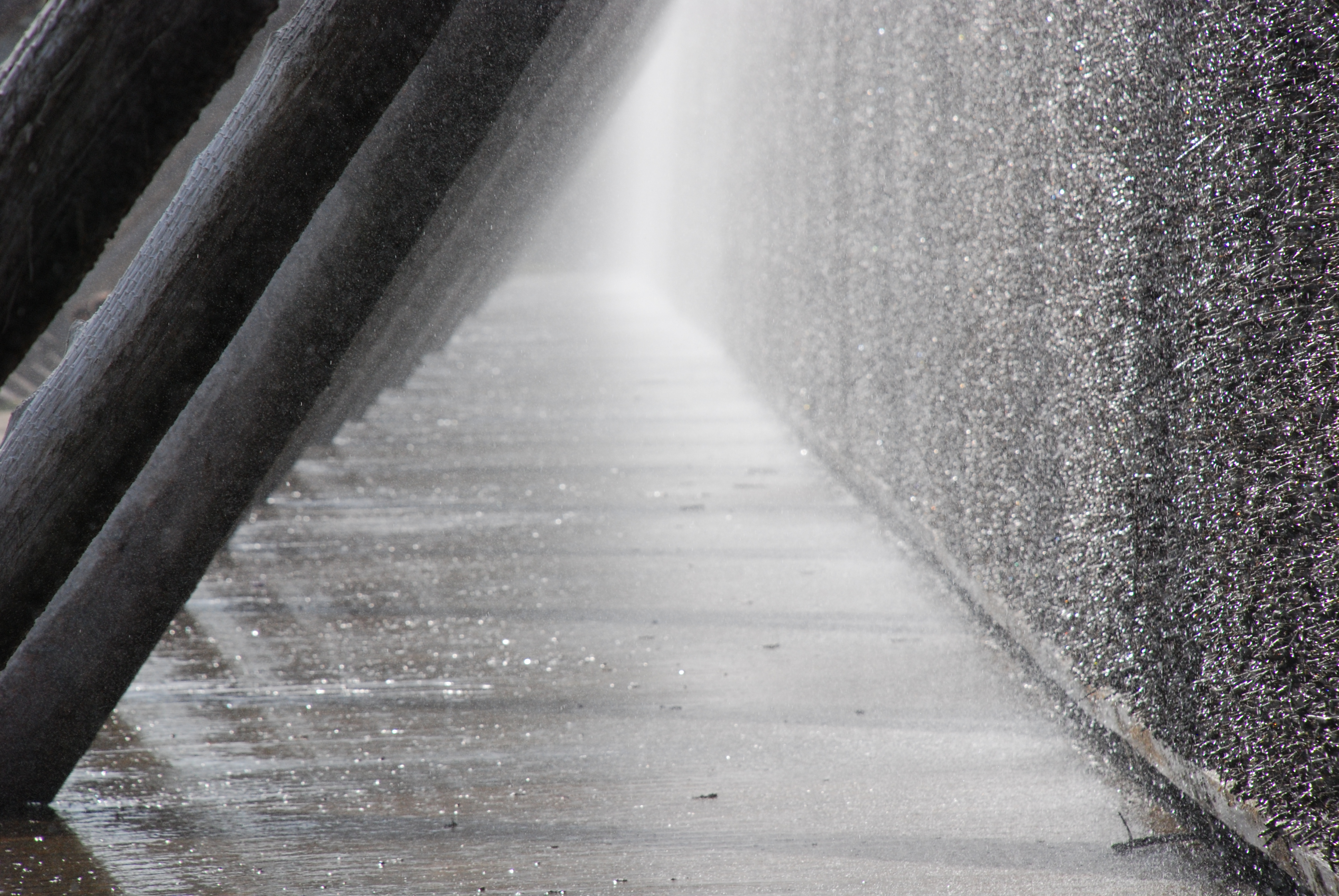
Aerosol at Ciechocinek facility

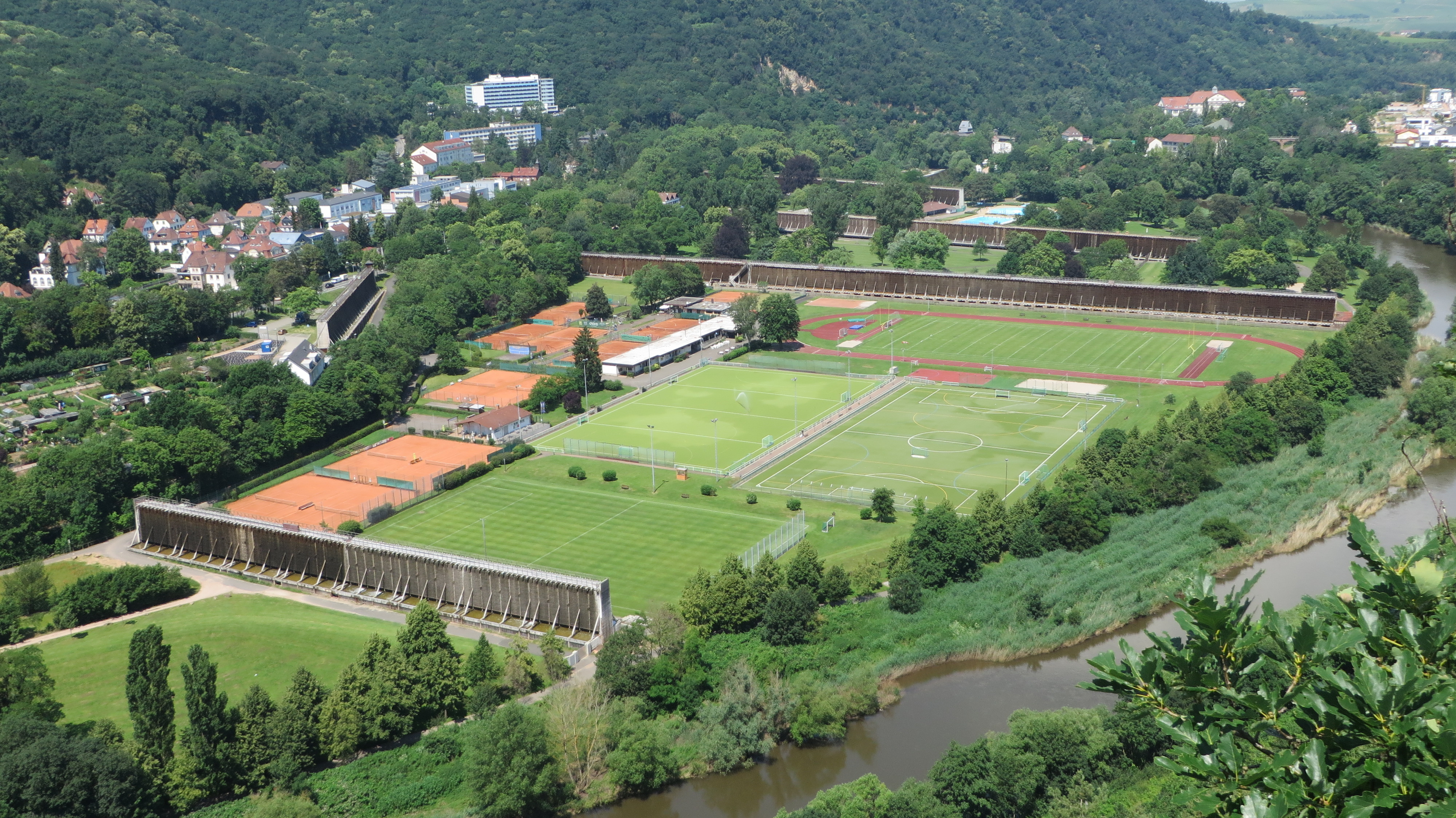
Graduation towers in Bad Kreuznach

== Partial list of towns and cities with graduation towers ==
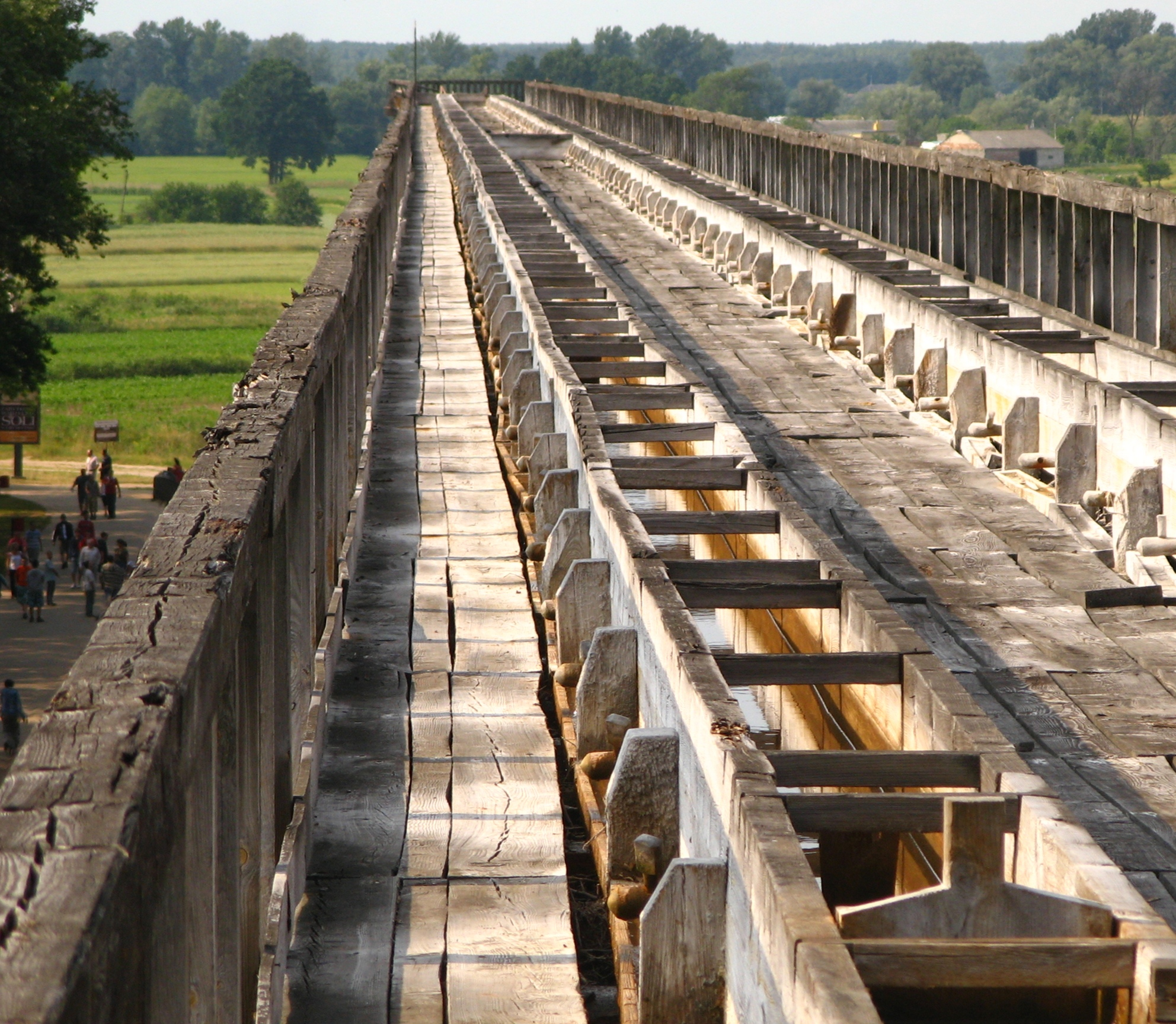
View from the top of the tower at Ciechocinek, Poland

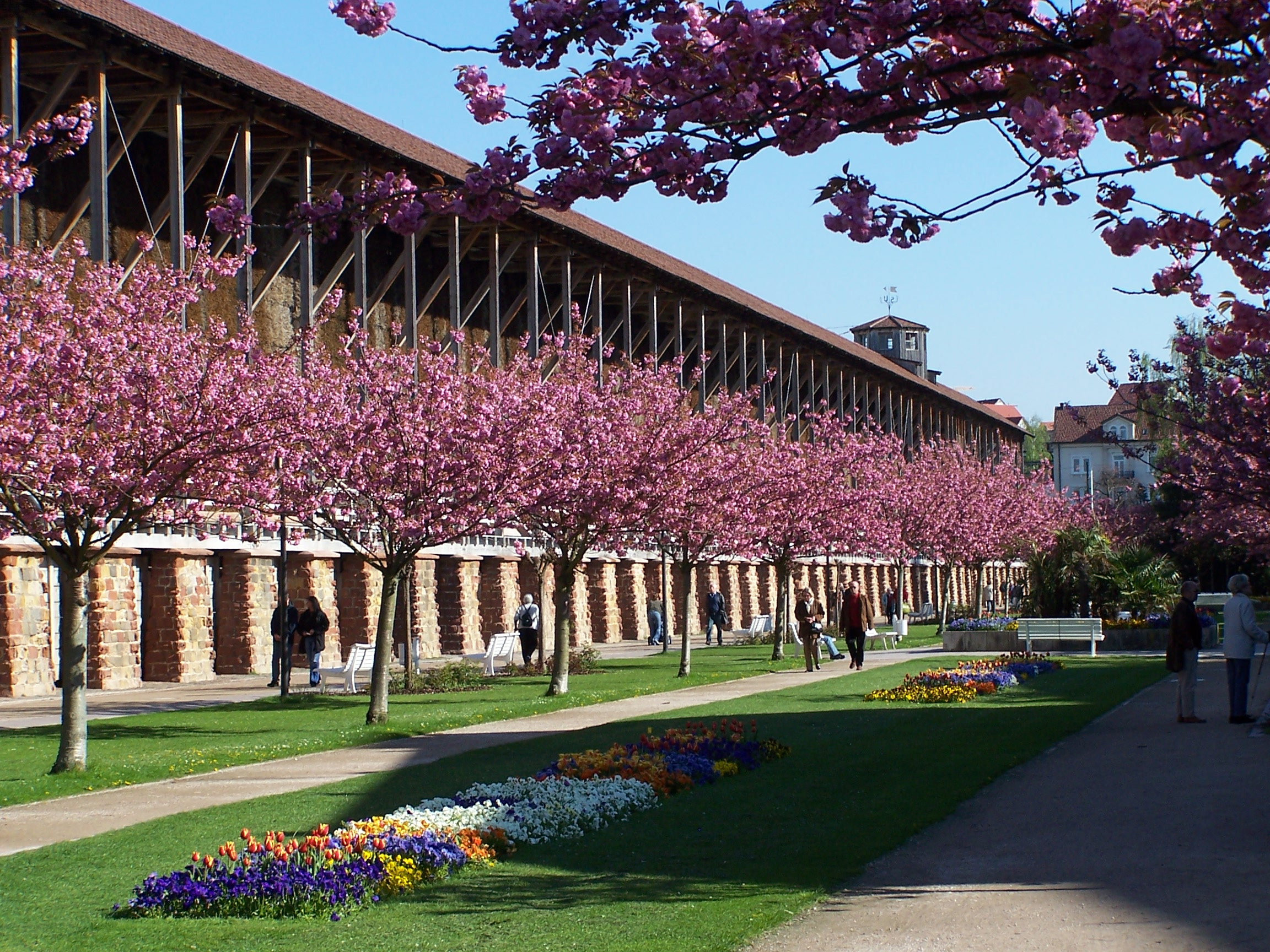
Bad Dürkheim

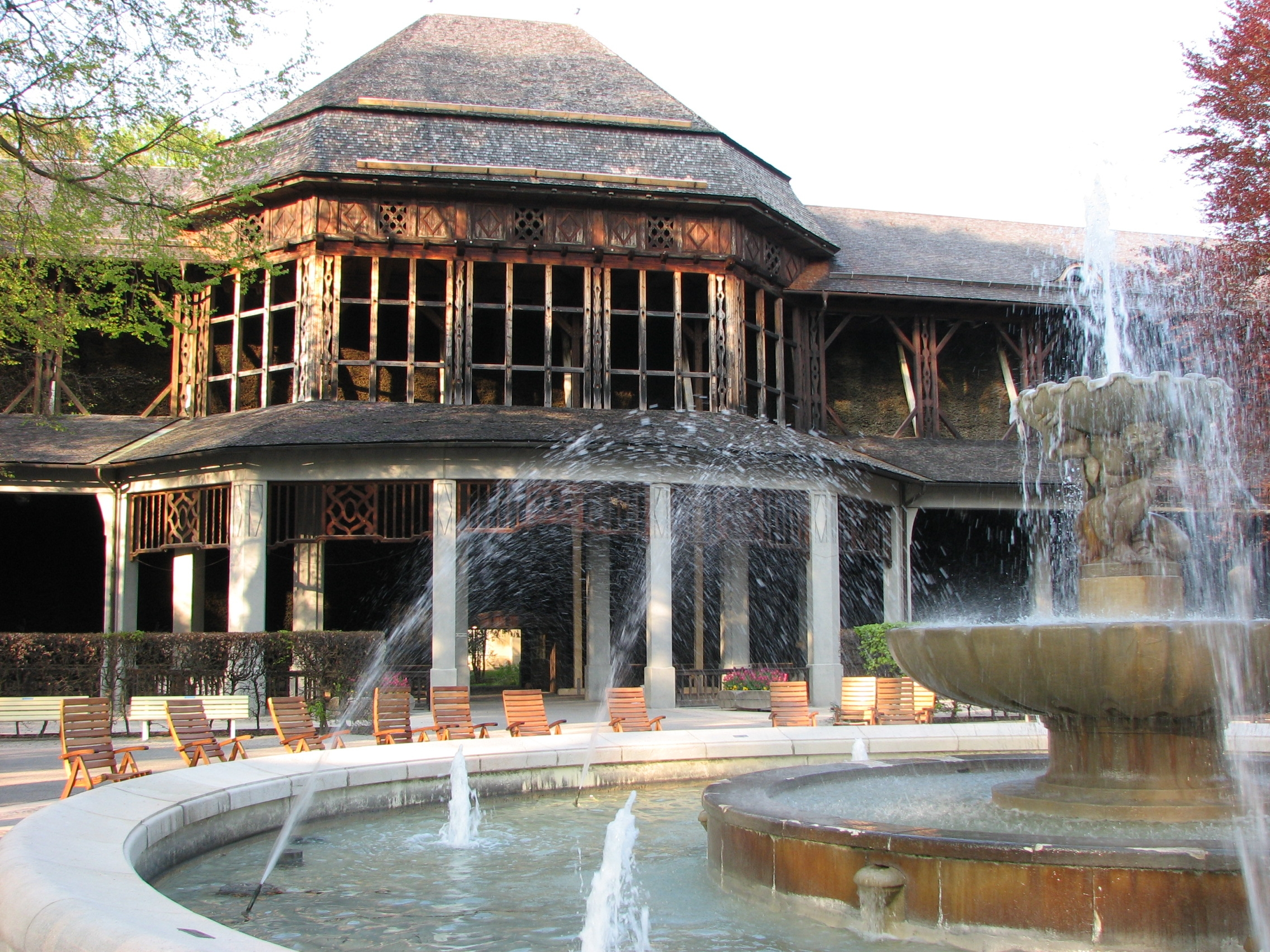
Bad Reichenhall

With years of initial construction where available. Does not include modern indoor facilities found in some spas.

France

- Saulnot (16th century)
- Arc-et-Senans (1775)

Germany

- Bad Dürkheim (1736)
- Bad Dürrenberg
- Bad Essen
- Bad Karlshafen (1986)
- Bad Kissingen (16th century)
- Bad Kreuznach (1732)
- Bad Kösen
- Bad Münster am Stein (1729)
- Bad Nauheim
- Bad Oeynhausen
- Bad Orb (1806)
- Bad Rappenau (2008)
- Bad Reichenhall (1911)
- Bad Rothenfelde (1777)
- Bad Salzdetfurth
- Bad Salzelmen (part of Schönebeck, 1756)
- Bad Salzhausen (around 1600)
- Bad Salzuflen (18th century)
- Bad Salzungen (1590)
- Bad Sassendorf
- Bad Soden (part of Bad Soden-Salmünster, 2006)
- Bad Sooden-Allendorf
- Bad Staffelstein
- Eibach (part of Dillenburg, 2004)
- Hamm (2008)
- Lüneburg (1907)
- Rheine (Saline Gottesgabe)
- Salzgitter-Bad (2009)
- Salzkotten

Poland

- Busko-Zdrój (since 2022)
- Ciechocinek (three towers: 1824 to 1859)
- Chorzów
- Gliwice
- Głuchołazy (since 2018)
- Gołdap (since 2014)
- Grudziądz (since 2006)
- Inowrocław (since 2001)
- Katowice (since 2018)
- Konstancin-Jeziorna (since 1978)
- Kraków (two towers: in Nowa Huta and Bagry districts, since 2021)
- Miłomłyn (since 2022)
- Latoszyn
- Lublin (Tężnia Solankowa "Sławinek") ul.Generała Józefa Zajączka
- Opole (since 2023)
- Radlin (since 2014)
- Radomsko (since 2022)
- Rabka-Zdrój
- Rymanów-Zdrój
- Świnoujście (since June 2021)
- Tarnów
- Ustka (since July 2020)
- Wieliczka (since 2014)
- Wysowa-Zdrój
- Żory (since 2023)
- Ząbki (since 2022)

Romania

- Baile Figa (2020)

United Kingdom

- Ayr (2019)
