= List of Lycée Louis-le-Grand people =

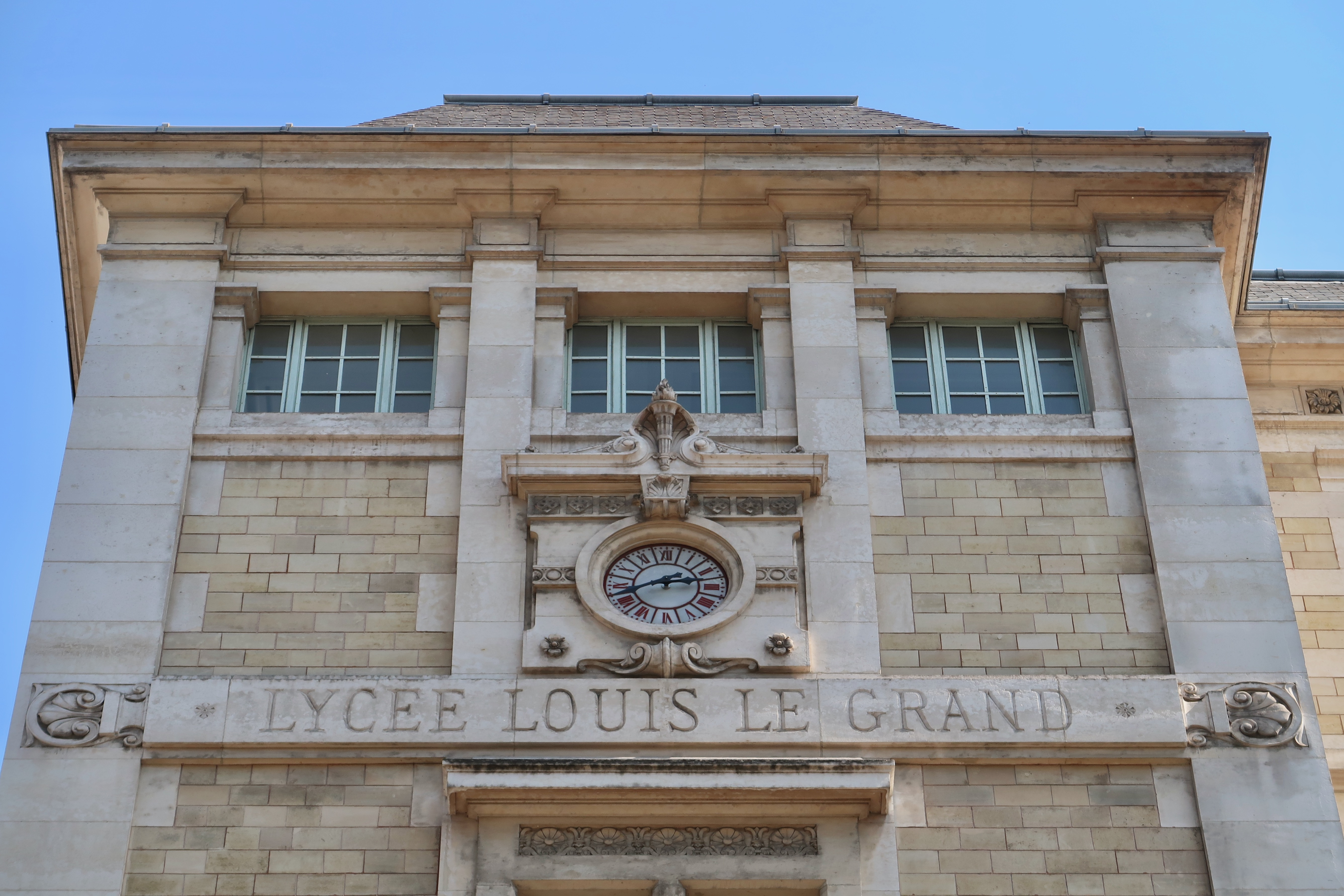
Lycée Louis-le-Grand in Paris

This page lists members of Lycée Louis-le-Grand, under the institution's successive identities including as Collège de Clermont from 1563 to 1682. It includes alumni, faculty, and administrators. Where available, it indicates the period when the individual was active at Louis-le-Grand. In each section, individuals are listed by chronological order of birthdate, which largely correlates with chronological order of presence at Louis-le-Grand.

The list does not include individuals who studied or taught in other educational institutions that later merged into Louis-le-Grand or into whose former premises Louis-le-Grand expanded. Such cases include names that are occasionally but questionably referred to as Louis-le-Grand alumni, e.g. Cyrano de Bergerac, Racine, Boileau, Charles Perrault and Rousseau at the Collège de Beauvais, or Turgot and Lafayette at the Collège du Plessis.

== Alumni ==
=== Writers, philosophers and social scientists ===
Writers and poets

- Charles de Saint-Évremond (1613–1703) in the 1620s
- Bussy-Rabutin (1618–1693) in the early 1630s
- Jean de Santeul (1630–1697) in the 1640s
- Pierre-Robert de Cideville (1693–1776) around 1710
- Jean-Jacques Lefranc de Pompignan (1709–1784) in the 1720s
- Marquis de Sade (1740–1814) in 1750–1754
- Victor Hugo (1802–1885) in 1816–1818
- Théophile Gautier (1811–1872) in 1820
- Charles Baudelaire (1821–1867) in 1836–1839
- Octave Feuillet (1821–1890) in the 1830s
- Paul Bourget (1852–1935) ca. late 1860s
- Romain Rolland (1866–1944) in the mid-1880s; Nobel Prize for Literature in 1915
- Léon Daudet (1867–1942) in the early 1880s
- Paul Claudel (1868–1955) in 1882–1885
- Paul Fort (1872–1960) in the 1880s
- Charles Péguy (1873–1914) part-time in 1891–1894
- Valery Larbaud (1881–1957) in the 1890s
- Alain-Fournier (1886–1914) in 1906–1907
- Jean Guéhenno (1890–1978) in 1910–1911
- Joseph Kessel (1898–1979) in the 1910s
- Jacques Rigaut (1898–1929) in the mid-1910s
- Pierre-Henri Simon (1903–1972) ca. 1921–1923
- Léopold Sédar Senghor (1906–2001) in the late 1920s
- Maurice Bardèche (1907–1998) in 1922–1928
- Phạm Duy Khiêm (1908–1974) ca. 1929–1931
- Robert Merle (1908–2004) ca. late 1920ssist
- René Étiemble (1909–2002) ca. 1927–1929
- Robert Brasillach (1909–1945) in 1925–1928
- Henri Queffélec (1910–1992) in the late 1920s
- Paul Guth (1910–1997) ca. late 1920s
- Aimé Césaire (1913–2008) in 1931–1935
- Roland Barthes (1915–1980) ca. 1931–1934
- Maurice Druon (1918–2009) in the late 1930s
- Michel Butor (1926–2016) in the 1940s
- Claude Esteban (1935–2006) ca. mid-1950s
- Jean-Loup Dabadie (1938–2020) in the 1950s
- Régis Debray (1940) in the late 1950s
- Olivier Rolin (1947) ca. mid-1960s
- Bernard-Henri Lévy (1948) in 1966–1968
- Frédéric Beigbeder (1965) in the early 1980s

Philosophers

- Voltaire (1694–1778) in 1704–1711
- Denis Diderot (1713–1784) around 1729–1732
- Julien Benda (1867–1956) in the early 1880s
- Jean Wahl (1888–1974) ca. 1906–1907
- Jean Guitton (1901–1999) in 1919–1920
- Jean Cavaillès (1903–1944) in 1920–1923
- Jean-Paul Sartre (1905–1980) in 1922–1924; Nobel Prize for Literature in 1964
- Maurice de Gandillac (1906–2006) ca. 1922–1924
- Maurice Merleau-Ponty (1908–1961) in the 1920s
- Jean-François Lyotard (1924–1998) ca. early 1940s
- Bertrand Poirot-Delpech (1929–2006) in the 1940s
- Jacques Derrida (1930–2004) in 1949–1952
- Alain Badiou (1937) in the mid-1950s
- Alain de Benoist (1943) ca. early 1960s
- Georges Chapouthier (1945) ca. early 1960s
- Philippe-Joseph Salazar (1955) 1973–1975
- Souleymane Bachir Diagne (1955) in the mid-1970s

Linguists, historians, anthropologists, sociologists, economists

- Émile Littré (1801–1881) in the 1810s
- Eugène Burnouf (1801–1852) in the 1810s
- Jean-Barthélemy Hauréau (1812–1896) in the 1820s
- Frédéric Passy (1822–1912) ca. 1833–1835; Nobel Peace Prize in 1901
- Charles Barbier de Meynard (1826–1908) ca. mid-1840s
- Gaston Maspero (1846–1916) in the early 1860s
- Auguste Angellier (1848–1911) ca. 1865–1866
- Ferdinand Brunetière (1849–1906) in the late 1860s
- Émile Durkheim (1858–1917) in the late 1870s
- Georges Goyau (1869–1939) in the late 1870s
- André Lichtenberger (1870–1940) in the 1880s
- Joseph Vendryes (1875–1960) around 1890
- Marc Bloch (1886–1944) ca. 1900–1904
- Émile-Guillaume Léonard (1891–1961) ca. 1908–1911
- Georges Dumézil (1898–1986) ca. 1914–1916
- Henri Laoust (1905–1983) in the early 1920s
- Maurice Allais (1911–2010) in 1930–1931; Nobel Memorial Prize in Economic Sciences in 1988
- Jacqueline de Romilly (1913–2010) ca. 1931–1933
- Jean-Henri Azéma (1913–2000) in the mid-1930s
- Jean-Pierre Vernant (1914–2007) in the early 1930s
- Jacques Le Goff (1924–2014) in the early 1940s
- Lucien Bianco (1930) ca. 1951–1952
- Pierre Bourdieu (1930–2002) in 1948–1951
- Claude Hagège (1936) in 1953–1955
- Alexandre Adler (1950) in the late 1960s
- Thomas Piketty (1971) ca. 1987–1989

=== Artists ===
Playwrights, actors and filmmakers

- Molière (1622–1673) possibly in the early 1640s
- Georges Méliès (1861–1938) in the late 1870s
- René Clair (1898–1981) in the mid-1910s
- Michel Cournot (1922–2007) in the late 1930s
- Jean-Paul Belmondo (1933–2021) in the early 1950s
- Patrice Chéreau (1944–2013) in the early 1960s
- André Weinfeld (1947) ca. mid-1960s
- Jérôme Deschamps (1947) in the 1960s

Visual artists

- Théodore Géricault (1791–1824) in 1806–1810
- Eugène Delacroix (1798–1863) in 1806–1815
- Edgar Degas (1834–1917) in 1845–1853
- Frédéric Auguste Bartholdi (1834–1904) in 1843–1851
- Gustave Caillebotte (1848–1894) in the late 1850s (in Vanves)
- François Flameng (1856–1923) ca. early 1870s
- Lucien Simon (1861–1945) in the 1870s
- Pierre Bonnard (1867–1947) in the 1880s
- François Tuefferd (1912–1996) around 1920

Composers

- Fabien Lévy (1968) in the 1980s

=== Scientists ===
- René Castel (1758–1832) in the 1770s
- Jean-Baptiste Biot (1774–1862) ca. 1780–1791
- Michel Chasles (1793–1880) in 1809–1812
- Gabriel Lamé (1795–1870) ca. 1810–1814
- Hippolyte Morestin (1869–1919) ca, 1883
- Arthur Morin (1795–1880) ca. 1810–1813
- Irénée-Jules Bienaymé (1796–1878) ca. 1812–1815
- Évariste Galois (1811–1832) in 1823–1829
- Paul-Quentin Desains (1817–1885) ca. 1830–1835
- Charles Hermite (1822–1901) in 1840–1842
- Étienne-Émile Desvaux (1830–1854) ca. 1843–1847
- Alphonse Laveran (1845–1922) ca. 1860–1863; Nobel Prize in Medicine in 1907
- Eugène Goblet d'Alviella (1846–1925) ca. 1862–1865
- Henri Becquerel (1852–1908) ca. 1868–1872; Nobel Prize in Physics in 1870
- Alfred Binet (1857–1911) ca. mid-1870s
- Jacques Hadamard (1865–1963) in the late 1870s and early 1880s
- Félix d'Hérelle (1873–1949) around 1890
- Jean Becquerel (1878–1953) in the 1890s
- Louis Leprince-Ringuet (1901–2000) in the 1910s
- Étienne Wolff (1904–1996) in the early 1920s
- Jean Bernard (1907–2006) in the early 1920s
- Laurent Schwartz (1915–2002) in 1932–1934; Fields Medal 1950
- Yves Colin de Verdière (1933) ca. early 1960s
- Serge Haroche (1944) ca. 1960–1963; Nobel Prize in Physics in 2012
- Olivier Faugeras (1949) ca. 1969–1971
- Gilles Pisier (1950) in 1967–1969
- Pierre-Louis Lions (1956) in 1973–1975; Fields Medal 1994
- Jean-Christophe Yoccoz (1957–2016) ca. 1971–1975; Fields Medal 1994
- Laurent Lafforgue (1966) in the mid-1980s; Fields Medal 2002
- Cédric Villani (1973) in 1990–1992; Fields Medal 2010

=== Statesmen and politicians ===
French heads of state and/or government

- Cardinal de Fleury (1653–1743), de facto first minister 1726–1743, at LLG ca. 1659–1665
- René Nicolas de Maupeou (1714–1792), chief minister 1770–1774, around 1730
- Maximilien de Robespierre (1758–1794), leader of the revolutionary government 1793–1794, in 1769–1781
- Paul Deschanel (1855–1922), President of the Republic in 1920, ca. 1865–1871
- Alexandre Millerand (1859–1943), President of the Republic 1920–1924, ca. 1875
- Raymond Poincaré (1860–1934), President of the Republic 1913–1920, ca. late 1870s
- Paul Painlevé (1863–1933), Prime Minister in 1917 and 1925, in 1877–1883
- Pierre Mendès France (1907–1982), President of the Council 1954–1955, ca. 1923
- Maurice Couve de Murville (1907–1999), Prime Minister 1968–1969, ca. early 1920s
- Alain Poher (1909–1996), acting President of the Republic in 1969 and 1974, ca. late 1920s
- Georges Pompidou (1911–1974), President of the Republic 1969–1974, ca. 1929–1931
- Michel Debré (1912–1996), Prime Minister 1959–1962, around 1930
- Pierre Messmer (1916–2007), Prime Minister 1972–1974, ca. early 1930s
- Valéry Giscard d'Estaing (1926–2020), President of the Republic 1974–1981, ca. 1940–1946
- Michel Rocard (1930–2016), Prime Minister 1988–1991, ca. mid-1940s
- Jacques Chirac (1932–2019), President of the Republic 1995–2002, ca. 1949–1951
- Alain Juppé (1945), Prime Minister 1995–1997, in 1962–1964
- Laurent Fabius (1946), Prime Minister 1984–1986, ca. 1964–1966

Heads of state and/or government in other countries

- Nicholas I of Montenegro (1841–1921), first and last King of Montenegro 1910–1918, at LLG ca. late 1850s
- Milan I of Serbia (1854–1901), King of Serbia 1882–1889, ca. 1861–1868
- Léopold Sédar Senghor (1906–2001), first President of Senegal 1960–1980, ca. 1929–1931
- Paul Biya (1933), President of Cameroon since 1982, in the 1950s

Other prominent politicians and public servants

- Armand de Bourbon, Prince of Conti (1629–1666), in the 1640s
- Étienne François, duc de Choiseul (1719–1785), secretary of state, at LLG ca. 1729-1730
- Cardinal de Bernis (1715–1794), diplomat and author, around 1730
- Charles Carroll of Carrollton (1737–1832), signatory of the United States Declaration of Independence, in the early 1750s
- Louis-Marie Stanislas Fréron (1754–1802), revolutionary leader, in the 1770s
- Camille Desmoulins (1760–1794), revolutionary leader, in the 1770s
- Victor Schœlcher (1804–1893), leading French abolitionist, in 1818–1819
- Édouard Drouyn de Lhuys (1805–1881), foreign affairs minister, in the 1820s
- Eugène Belgrand (1810–1878), public works leader, ca. 1828–1829
- Émile Beaussire (1824–1889), deputy and philosopher, ca. early 1840s
- Henry Adrian Churchill (1828–1886), British explorer and diplomat, in 1841–1846
- Paul d'Estournelles de Constant (1852–1924), diplomat, in 1862–1870; Nobel Peace Prize in 1909
- Jean Jaurès (1859–1914), founding president of the French Socialist Party, in the mid-1870s
- Maurice Papon (1910–2007), French minister, in the 1920s
- Edgard Pisani (1918–2016), French minister and European Commissioner, in 1939
- Jacques de Larosière (1929), central banker, in the late 1940s
- Jean Tiberi (1935), Mayor of Paris 1995–2001, in the early 1950s
- Aziz Mekouar (1950), Moroccan diplomat, around 1970
- Jean-Marie Le Guen (1953), junior minister, in the early 1970s
- Thierry Breton (1955), French minister and European Commissioner, in 1972–1975
- Ridha Grira (1955), Tunisian minister, ca. 1974–1976
- Božidar Đelić (1965), Serbian Finance Minister 2001–2003, in 1980–1984

=== Business leaders ===
- Louis Hachette (1800–1864), founder of Hachette (publisher), ca. 1815–1819
- Eugène Goüin (1818–1909), cofounder and later chairman of the Banque de Paris et des Pays-Bas, in the 1830s
- André Michelin (1853–1931), co-founder of Michelin, in the early 1870s
- André Citroën (1878–1935), founder of Citroën, ca. 1896–1898
- Michel Pébereau (1942), builder of BNP Paribas, around 1960
- Jean-Charles Naouri (1949), owner of Groupe Casino, ca. 1965–1967
- Jean-Sébastien Jacques (1971), CEO of Rio Tinto, ca. 1990–1994

=== Religious figures ===
- Saint Francis de Sales (1567–1622) in 1578–1588
- Pierre de Bérulle (1575–1629) ca. 1591–1595
- Jean François Paul de Gondi, Cardinal de Retz (1613–1679) in 1625–1631
- Claude Poullart des Places (1679–1709) in the early 1700s
- John Dubois (1764–1842) ca. 1773–1785
- Dalil Boubakeur (1940) ca. 1957–1959
- Philippe Jourdan (1960) ca. late 1970s

=== Military leaders and resistance fighters ===
- Charles François Dumouriez (1739–1823) in the 1750s
- Louis Vallin (1770–1854) ca. late 1780s / early 1790s
- Maxime Weygand (1867–1965) in the early 1880s
- Henri Honoré d'Estienne d'Orves (1901–1941) in 1919–1921
- Pierre Brossolette (1903–1944) ca. 1921–1922
- Jacques Lusseyran (1924–1971) in 1940–1943
- Thomas Elek (1924–1944) ca. 1940–1941

=== Other notable alumni ===
- Ernest Malinowski (1818–1899), Polish civil engineer, in 1832–1834
- Arthur Chassériau (1850–1934), art collector, ca. late 1860s / early 1870s
- Jacques Vergès (1926), lawyer, ca. 1936–1940
- Jacques Frémontier (1930–2020), journalist and television producer, ca. mid-1940s
- Gaston Juchet (1930–2007), engineer, ca. early 1950s
- Claude Ribbe (1954), activist and filmmaker, ca. early 1960s
- Philippe Boisse (1955), fencer, ca. early 1970s

== Faculty ==
- Juan Maldonado (1533–1583)
- Juan de Mariana (1536–1624)
- Francisco Suárez (1548–1617)
- Philippe Labbe (1607–1667)
- René Rapin (1621–1687)
- Ignace-Gaston Pardies (1636–1673)
- Marc-Antoine Charpentier (1643–1704)
- Charles de La Rue (1643–1725)
- René-Joseph de Tournemine (1661–1739)
- Claude Buffier (1661–1737)
- Jean-Baptiste Du Halde (1674–1743)
- Charles Porée (1675–1741)
- Pierre Brumoy (1688–1742)
- Charles Pierre Chapsal (1787–1858)
- Anatole Bailly (1833–1911)
- Henri Théophile Bocquillon (1834–1884)
- Jean Gaston Darboux (1842–1917)
- Auguste Burdeau (1851–1894)
- Jules Combarieu (1859–1916)
- Gustave Belot (1859–1929)
- Lucien Poincaré (1862–1920)
- Joseph Bédier (1864–1938)
- André Bellessort (1866–1942)
- Henri Abraham (1868–1943)
- Félicien Challaye (1875–1967)
- Étienne Weill-Raynal (1887–1982)
- Jean Guéhenno (1890–1978)
- Georges Bidault (1899–1983)
- Ferdinand Alquié (1906–1985)
- Charles Pellat (1914–1992)
- Robert Misrahi (1926–2023)
- Philippe Contamine (1932)
- André Warusfel (1936–2016)
- Donald Adamson (1939)
- Roger Chartier (1945)
- Gilles Deleuze (1925–1995)

== Administrators ==
=== Jesuit rectors ===
This list is mainly based on the monography published in 1845 by Gustave Émond.

- Ponce Cogordan (c.1563-1564)
- Edmund Hay (c.1564-1575)
- Pierre-Claude Mathieu (c.1575-1579)
- Odon Pigenat (c.1580-1581)
- Jean Sangenot (c.1582-1583)
- Alexandre Georges (c.1584-1593)
- Pierre Barny (1606)
- François Thyal (1607)
- Jean-Baptiste de Machault (c.1608-1613)
- Charles de la Tour (c.1613-1617)
- Jacques Sirmond (c.1617-1621)
- Jean Filleau (c.1622-1625 and 1630)
- Ignace Armand (c.1626-1629)
- Étienne Binet (c.1631-1633)
- Louis Malrat (c.1634)
- Jacques Dinet (c.1635-1638)
- Julien Hayneufve (c.1639-1646)
- Étienne Noël (c.1646-1649)
- Charles Lallemant (c.1649-1650 and 1660–1662)
- Jean-Baptiste Ragon (c.1651-1654)
- Philippe Shahu (c.1655-1657)
- Claude Boucher (c.1658-1659)
- Étienne Agard de Champs (c.1663-1667, 1682–1683, and 1687–1690)
- Jean de Turmenie (c.1668-1670)
- Pierre de Verthamon (c.1671-1673)
- Jean Pinette (c.1674-1677)
- Jacques Pallu (1678–1681)
- Jacques le Picart (c.1683-1686 and 1702–1704)
- Guillaume Ayrault (or Hurault) (c.1690-1693)
- Pierre Pommereau (c.1694-1697)
- Julien Baudran (c.1698-1699)
- Isaac Martineau (c.1700-1701)
- Michel Le Tellier (ca. 1705)
- Henri-Charles Forcet (c.1706-1708)
- Charles Dauchez (c.1709-1711)
- Louis-François Clavyer (c.1712-1714)
- Louis Labbe (c.1715-1717)
- Honoré Gaillard (c.1718-1720)
- Jacques-Philippe Lallemant (c.1720)
- François de Richebourg (c.1721-1723)
- François de Canappeville (c.1724-1726)
- Jean-Baptiste Bellingan (c.1727-1730)
- Jacques de Guenonville (c.1731-1733)
- Jean Lavant or Lavaux (c.1734-1737)
- Etienne Frogerais (c.1738-1740)
- Martin de Fontenelle (c.1741-1743)
- Joachim de la Grandville (c.1744-1748)
- Louis Le Gallic (c.1749-1751)
- Mathurin Germain Le Forestier (1752–1754)
- François de Saint-Jean (c.1754-1755)
- Mathieu-Jean-Joseph Allanic (c.1756-1759)
- Etienne de la Croix (c.1760)
- Henri Frelaut (c.1761-1762)

=== Principals ===
- Abbé Gardin du Mesnil (1764–1770)
- Abbé Poignard (1770–1778)
- Denis Bérardier (1778–1788)
- Jean-Louis Romet (1788–1791)
- Jean-François Champagne (1791–1808)

=== Provisors ===
- Jean-François Champagne (1808–1810)
- Louis-Joseph de Sermand (1810–1815)
- Louis Gabriel Taillefer (1815–1819).
- François Christophe Malleval (1819–1823)
- Nicolas Bertot or Berthot (1823–1824)
- Pierre-Laurent Laborie (1824–1830)
- Jules Amable Pierrot-Deseilligny (1830–1845)
- Jacques Rinn (1845–1853)
- Bernard Forneron (1853–1856)
- Jean-Baptiste Antoine Jullien (1856–1864)
- Frédéric Jules Edmond Didier (1864–1868)
- Julien Girard (1868–1878)
- Charles Gidel (1878–1892)
- Désiré Blanchet (1892–1895)
- Alexandre Gazeau (1895–1909)
- Georges Ferté (1909–1929)
- Émile Abry (1929–1931)
- Émile Berrod (1931–1938)
- Lucien Chattelun (1938–1941)
- Camille Gibelin (1941–1955)
- Mr Boyé (1942–1944, acting)
- Raymond Schiltz (1955–1968)
- Albert Praud (1968–1969)
- Paul Deheuvels (1969–1991)
- Yves de Saint-Do (1991–1997)
- Joël Vallat (1997–2012)
- Michel Bouchaud (2012–2015)
- Jean Bastianelli (2015–2020)
- Joël Bianco (since 2020)

== See also ==
- Lycée Louis-le-Grand
- List of alumni of Jesuit educational institutions
