= Jacques Bloch =

French resistant (1924–2023)

- Born: 7 July 1924; Paris, France
- Died: 28 January 2023 (aged 98)
- Occupation: Resistance fighter

Jacques Bloch (7 July 1924 – 28 January 2023) was a French resistance fighter.

== Biography ==
Born in Paris on 7 July 1924, Bloch was the son of a mother from Lorraine and a father who was a teacher of philosophy of Jewish origin from Alsace. He was 15 years old at the onset of World War II. Like other Jews in France, his family faced oppression under the regime of Vichy France. His father mobilized in summer 1941 and learned he had been dismissed from his teaching position upon his return. Two days later, the family home was seized by the Germans, forcing them to first move to Touraine and next to Creuse, where they found Bloch's cousin Marc Bloch and learned of their imminent arrest.

After asking his cousin for contacts within the French Resistance, Bloch joined the Maquis in Bourganeuf on 19 February 1944 and took the pseudonym "Jacques Binet". During the liberation of Guéret on 7 June 1944, he was wounded in battle against the 2nd SS Panzer Division Das Reich and taken to a hospital, where a surgeon amputated his arm. Upon his release, he was discovered by a soldier of the Milice and handed over to the Gestapo. Escaping immediate execution, he was sent to Montluçon.

After his internment in Montluçon, Bloch was sent to Moulins where he was imprisoned alongside other resistance fighters of the Castle of the dukes of Bourbon. After that, he was sent to Buchenwald and bore the registration number 85235. Despite his injury, he was considered to be a strong young man and was made responsible for transporting wood to kitchens. At the camp, he met the likes of Maurice Halbwachs and Jacques Lusseyran.

When Buchenwald was evacuated in April 1945, Bloch escaped with other prisoners and met the Americans at Eisenberg, Thuringia. After the war, he studied law and became an administrator of the Senate.

Jacques Bloch died on 28 January 2023, at the age of 98.

== Distinctions ==
- Resistance Medal (1946)
