= Nicolas Mary =

Nicolas Mary, sieur Desfontaines also called Desfontaines, born c. 1610 in Rouen – died 4 February 1652 in Angers, was a 17th-century French playwright, novelist and actor.

A prolific author, Desfontaines composed 13 theatre plays including L’Illustre Comédien ou Le Martyre de Saint Genest (1645) (which was revived by Rotrou the following year), Eurymédon ou l’Illustre Pirate, (1637), Orphise ou la Beauté persécutée (1638), Hermogène (1638), Bélisaire (1641), Les Galantes vertueuses (1642), Le Martyre de Saint Eustache (1644), Saint Alexis ou l’Illustre Olympie (1644), Alcidiane ou Les Quatre Rivaux (1645), Belissante ou l’Infidélité reconnue (1647) and La Véritable Sémiramis (1647).

An enthusiastic admirer of Corneille, Desfontaines also left a sequel to his tragedy Le Cid entitled la Vraie Suite du Cid as well as a follow-up to the tragedy Ibrahim Bassa by Georges de Scudéry.

Desfontaines gave three novels, les Heureuses Infortunes de Céliante et Marilinde, Veuves-Pucelles (1638), l’Illustre Amazonthe (1645) and l’Inceste innocent (1658).

Desfontaines also wrote about some religious subjects and was a translator from Italian.

== Works ==
- Tragédies hagiographiques, texts edited and presented by Claude Bourqui and Simone de Reyff, Paris, Société des textes français modernes, ISBN 2865032736

== Sources ==
- Louis-Henri Baratte, Poètes normands, Paris, Lacrampe, 1845
- Théodore-Éloi Lebreton, Biographie rouennaise, Rouen, Le Brument, 1865
- Joseph-François Michaud, Louis Gabriel Michaud, Biographie universelle, ancienne et moderne, Paris, Michaud, 1813
