= Lycée Louis-le-Grand =

Secondary school in Paris

- Former name: Collège de Clermont (1563–1682)
- Type: Local public Institution (EPLE)
- Established: 1 October 1563; 463 years ago
- Headmaster: Mireille Basso
- Students: 1,818 students in 2009
- Location: 123 rue Saint-Jacques, Paris, France; 48.848056°N 2.344528°E
- Medium of instruction: French
- Website: www.louislegrand.fr

The Lycée Louis-le-Grand (French pronunciation: [lise lwi lə gʁɑ̃]), also referred to simply as Louis-le-Grand or by its acronym LLG, is a public lycée (French secondary school, also known as sixth form college) located on rue Saint-Jacques in central Paris.

It was founded in the early 1560s by the Jesuits as the Collège de Clermont, was renamed in 1682 after King Louis XIV ("Louis the Great"), and has remained at the apex of France's secondary education system despite its disruption in 1762 following the suppression of the Society of Jesus. It offers both a high school curriculum and a classes préparatoires post-secondary-level curriculum in the sciences, business and humanities.

== Location ==
Louis-le-Grand is located in the heart of the Quartier Latin, the centuries-old student district of Paris. It is surrounded by other storied educational institutions: the Sorbonne to its west, across rue Saint-Jacques; the Collège de France to its north, across rue du Cimetière-Saint-Benoist; the Panthéon campus of Paris 2 Panthéon-Assas University to its south, across rue Cujas; the former Collège Sainte-Barbe to its east, across impasse Chartière; and the Sainte-Geneviève Library to its southeast.

== History ==
=== Jesuit college (1560–1762) ===
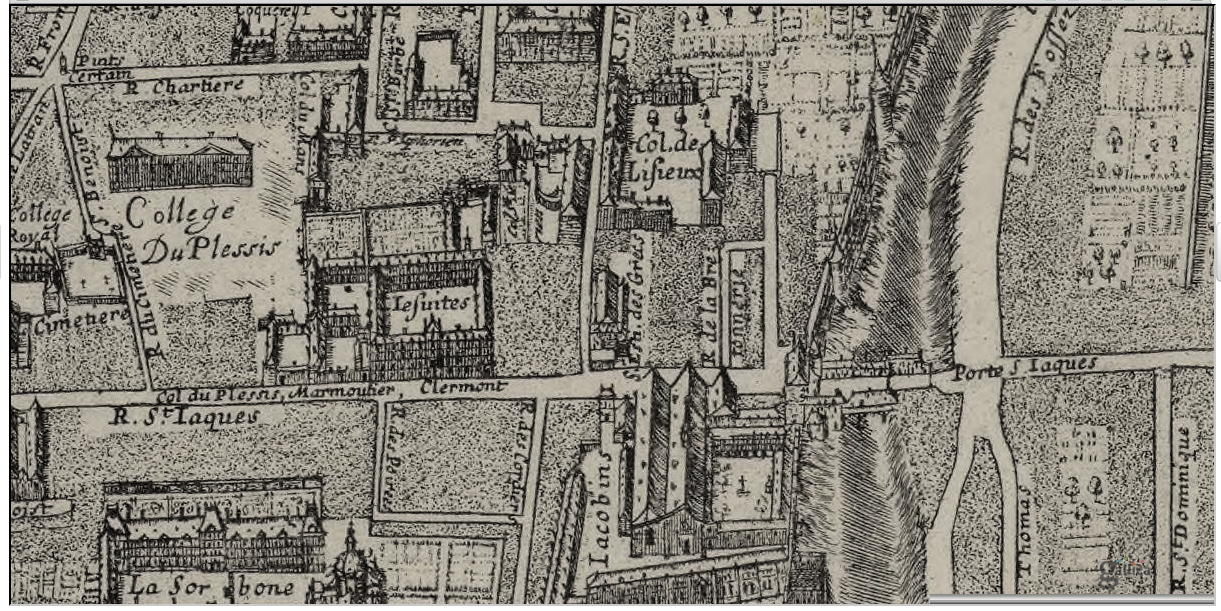
Collège de Clermont ("Iesuites") on the 1652 Plan de Gomboust, with the Collège de Marmoutiers to the left, the Collège du Mans above left, the Collège des Cholets above right, and the Collège du Plessis further left

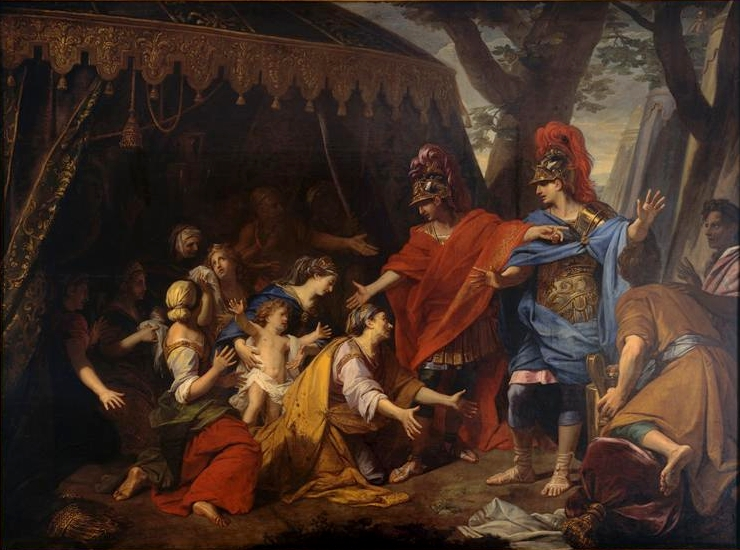
Alexandre et la famille de Darius, painting by Jean Jouvenet donated in 1674 by Louis XIV

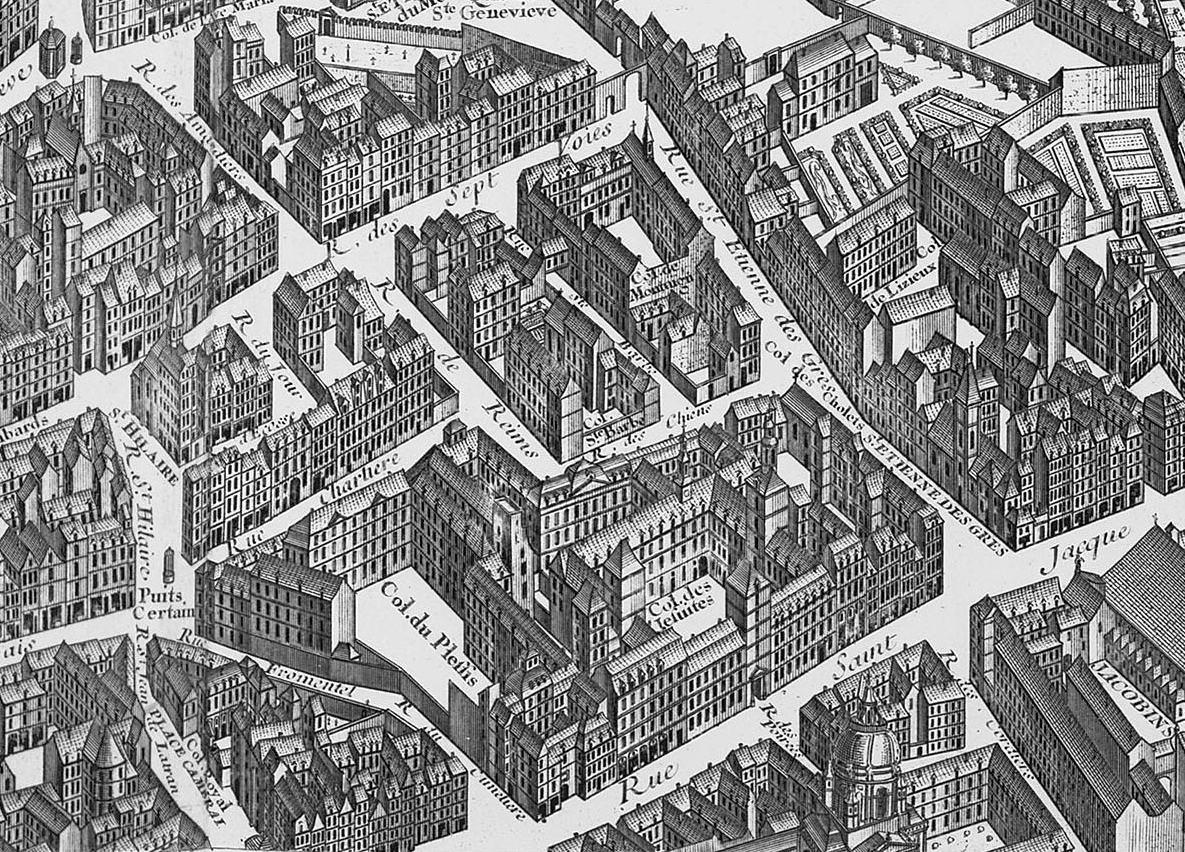
Louis-le-Grand ("Col. des Jesuites", bottom center) on the 1739 Turgot map of Paris

Jesuit students, mostly from Spain and Italy, were present in Paris immediately after the Society of Jesus's foundation, first in 1540 at the Collège du Trésorier and from 1541 at the Collège des Lombards. From 1550 on, Guillaume Duprat, the bishop of Clermont, who in the previous decade had met early Jesuit leaders Claude Le Jay and Diego Laynez and corresponded with Ignatius of Loyola, invited Jesuit students to stay in his mansion, the Hôtel de Clermont on rue de la Harpe. The Hôtel de Clermont thus became the Jesuit order's first permanent home in Paris. It no longer exists following its annexation in the 17th century by the nearby Collège d'Harcourt, and stood on a location that is now part of the Lycée Saint-Louis.

Upon his death on 23 October 1560, Duprat bequested an endowment for a new Jesuit college in Paris, as well as funds for two other colleges in the vicinity of Clermont, at Billom and Mauriac. The Parisian project was eagerly supported by Laynez, by then the Jesuits' Superior General, who wanted it to become "the most celebrated college of the Society". It was delayed, however, by dilatory initiatives by the Parlement of Paris, University of Paris, and local clergy, all of which opposed the Jesuits' establishment. In July 1563, the Jesuits were finally able to purchase the former Parisian estate of the bishop of Langres on rue Saint-Jacques, where its current cour d'honneur now stands, and started teaching there in late 1563 (Old Style). The new institution was named Collège de Clermont, in recognition of Duprat's support but also because one of the conditions that the Jesuits accepted to overcome local opposition was not to formally name the college after the Society of Jesus as they did elsewhere.

The college soon met considerable success, as it was both free and of high quality, disrupting the antiquated business models and longstanding conventions of the University of Paris. In particular, its theology course, led from the 1564 inception by Juan Maldonado, was so popular that the college's buildings were too small to contain the audience. Other prominent early faculty included Pierre Perpinien, Juan de Mariana, and Francisco Suárez.

The University of Paris had been hostile to the Jesuits from the start, in line with its general rejection of novel initiatives and long before that hostility took doctrinal undertones in the 17th and 18th centuries as the Jesuits became a key adversary for Jansenists. In 1554, the university's College of Sorbonne had already issued a negative opinion regarding the opening of a college in Paris. That opposition was temporarily overcome at the monarchy's initiative during the Colloquy of Poissy on 15 September 1561, but the university kept debating the matter after the college started teaching in 1564. On 16 February 1565, it refused to recognize it and thereby nullified the prior favorable decision of Poissy. The multiple cases brought by the university before the court of the Parlement of Paris, and counter-cases from the Jesuits, resulted in a stalemate that lasted over the next three decades: the Collège de Clermont was not readmitted into the university system, but the Jesuits were able to continue and expand their activities, even though Maldonado was removed from Paris in 1575 following accusations of heresy by Sorbonne theologians. While the courses were free of charge, boarding costs for the resident students, who typically came from elite families, were covered by gifts and scholarships, and the corresponding accounts were kept separate until the Jesuits' departure in 1762. In the 1580s, the college's students numbered in the thousands, of which several hundreds were resident (pensionnaires and boursiers). The faculty included several dozen Jesuit priests.

Unlike most colleges of the university, the Jesuit college remained open during the Siege of Paris in 1590, albeit with reduced activity, and inevitably colluded with the Catholic League, as did the university too. On 27 December 1594, an alumnus of the college, Jean Châtel, attempted to assassinate King Henry IV. As a reaction, the king took the side of the Jesuits' longstanding accusers such as Parlement lawyer Antoine Arnauld, and expelled the Jesuits from France, including those in Paris. In 1595, the bibliothèque du roi was relocated into the college's premises and stayed there until 1603. That year, Henry allowed the Jesuits to return to France on the conditions that they be French nationals. They were allowed to retake the college building in 1606, and to fully restart their teaching in 1610. On 22 December 1611, however, upon a new case brought by the university and in the changed political context resulting from Henry IV's assassination in May 1610 by François Ravaillac, the Parlement of Paris forbade the Jesuits from teaching in Paris. That ruling, in turn, was reversed by a decision of Louis XIII on 15 February 1618, allowing the Jesuits to resume teaching for good.

Despite its near-continuous interruption between 1595 and 1618, the College de Clermont almost immediately recovered and reached an equivalent level of activity to its heyday of the 1570s and 1580s. Its adversaries made sure that it would still not obtain admission into the university, but otherwise their attempts to undermine it met with decreasing success, given the continuing support the Jesuits were able to secure from the monarchy and high nobility. The college was regularly bolstered by royal visits, including by Louis XIII in 1625 and Louis XIV in 1674. On the latter occasion, the king donated a painting by Jean Jouvenet, Alexander and the family of Darius, which remains to this day in the office of Louis-le-Grand's principal.

Several notable scholars were resident in the college, including mathematician Pierre Bourdin (1595–1653), historian Philippe Labbe (1607–1667), or Latinist Charles de la Rue (1643–1725). Other faculty included author René Rapin (1621–1687), scientist Ignace-Gaston Pardies (1636–1673), historian Claude Buffier (1661–1737), theologian René-Joseph de Tournemine (1661–1739), sinologist Jean-Baptiste Du Halde (1674–1743), rhetorician Charles Porée (1675–1741), and humanist Pierre Brumoy (1688–1742). Composer Marc-Antoine Charpentier, who may have studied at the college, was its music master (maître de musique) between 1688 and 1698. The college library had about 40,000 volumes as of 1718, and included unique manuscripts such as the Chronicle of Fredegar (occasionally known for that reason as Codex Claromontanus) or Anonymus Valesianus. As in other Jesuit colleges, theatrical representations became increasingly prominent during the 17th century. Also as in other colleges, in 1660 the Jesuits opened an observatory, and in 1679 they created the elaborate sundials, augmented in the 18th century, that survive to this day on the northern side of the cour d'honneur thanks to preservation campaigns in 1842 and 1988.

The college undertook a rebuilding campaign in 1628, on a design attributed to Paris municipal architect Augustin Guillain. It expanded by acquiring more buildings, to its northeast from the recently closed Collège de Marmoutiers in 1641, and to its south from the Collège des Cholets in 1656 and 1660. In 1682, the college was able to expand further by acquiring the buildings of the Collège du Mans to its east, after a century of attempts, as that college's activities were relocated elsewhere in Paris.

Also in 1682, Louis XIV formally authorized the college to change its name to Collegium Ludovici Magni (French: Collège Louis-le-Grand). That act confirmed its royal patronage, despite the near-simultaneous Declaration of the Clergy of France and the kingdom's ongoing conflicts with the Papacy, to which the Jesuits were directly tied by their vows. Already in 1674, during his visit, Louis was said to have remarked "c'est mon collège" ("this is my college"). A black marble slab with the inscription COLLEGIVM LVDOVICI MAGNI (College of Louis the Great) was promptly placed on the façade, in substitution to the earlier text COLLEGIVM CLAROMONTANVM SOCIETATIS IESV, which triggered controversy. (The anecdote was narrated by Gérard de Nerval in his short story Histoire de l’Abbé de Bucquoy, published in 1852 in the collection titled Les Illuminés.) The new inscription survived later turmoil, and was relocated on the eastern side of the cour d'honneur during the late-19th-century rebuilding.

In 1700, Louis-le-Grand took over the École des Jeunes de langues, founded in 1669 by Jean-Baptiste Colbert, in line with the Jesuits' leadership in studying foreign languages and foreign cultures, reinforced since 1685 with the permanent mission in China initiated by six Jesuits from Louis-le-Grand. Antoine Galland, the first Western European translator of One Thousand and One Nights, had studied in this section and taught Arabic there from 1709. In 1742 the college had five Chinese students: Paul Liu, Maur Cao, Thomas Liu, Philippe-Stanislas Kang, and Ignace-Xavier Lan, who had come from China via Macau together with Jesuit Father Foureau.

=== After 1762-1804 ===
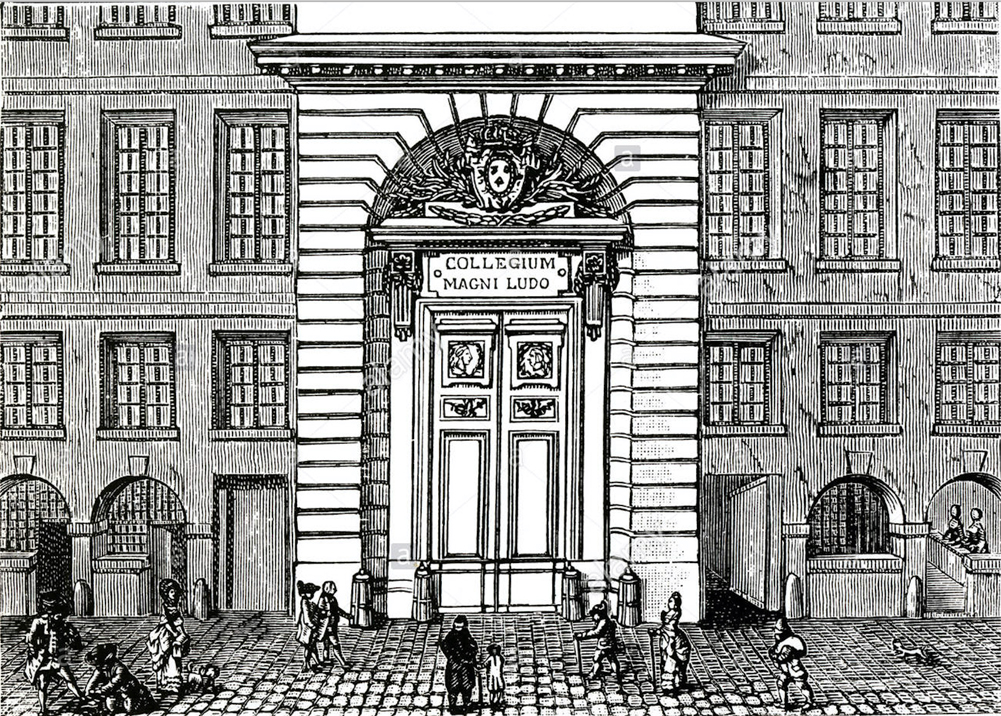
Entrance of the college in 1789, engraving by François-Nicolas Martinet

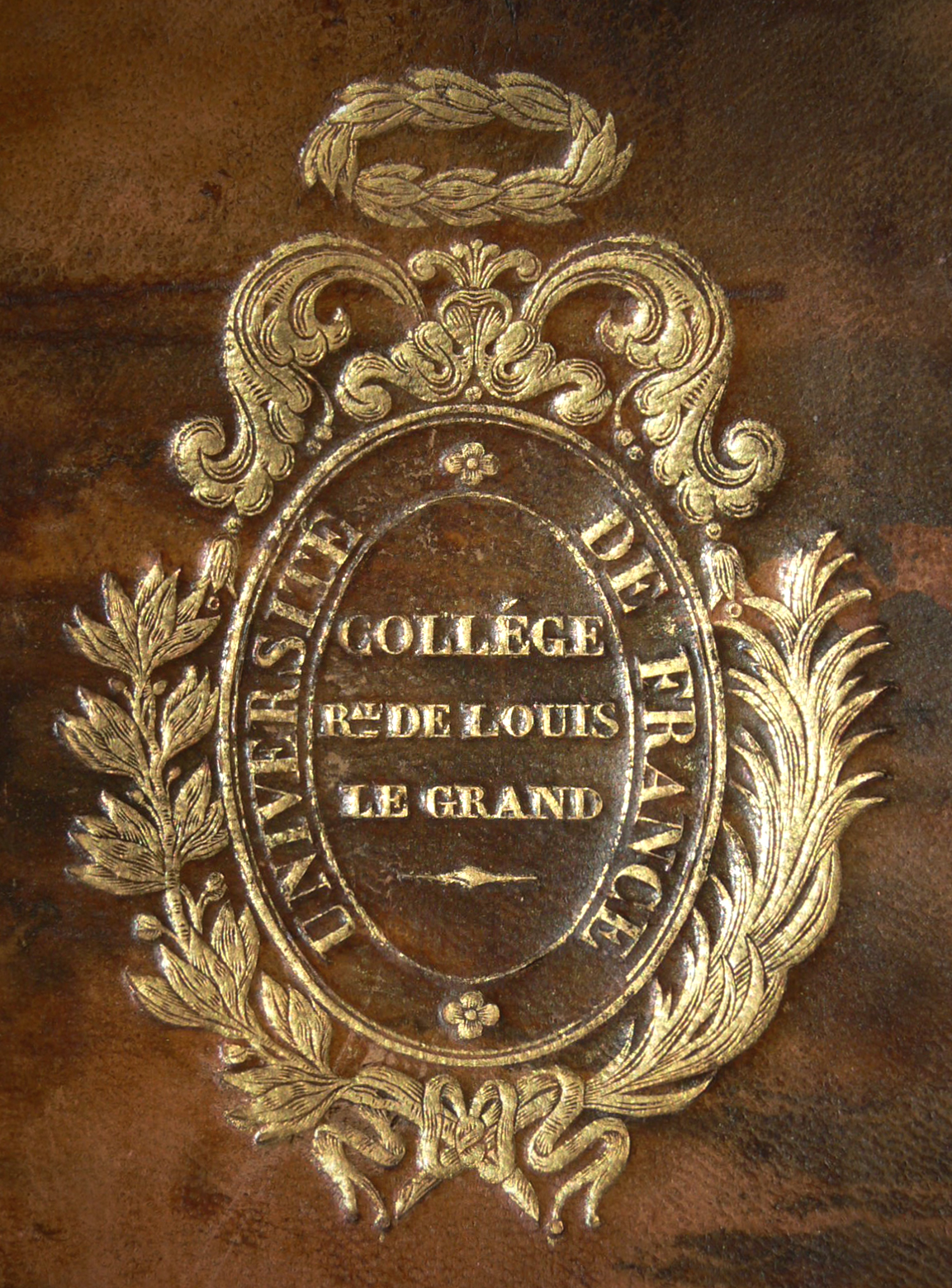
Arms of Louis-le-Grand on a book binding highlighting its affiliation with the university during the July Monarchy

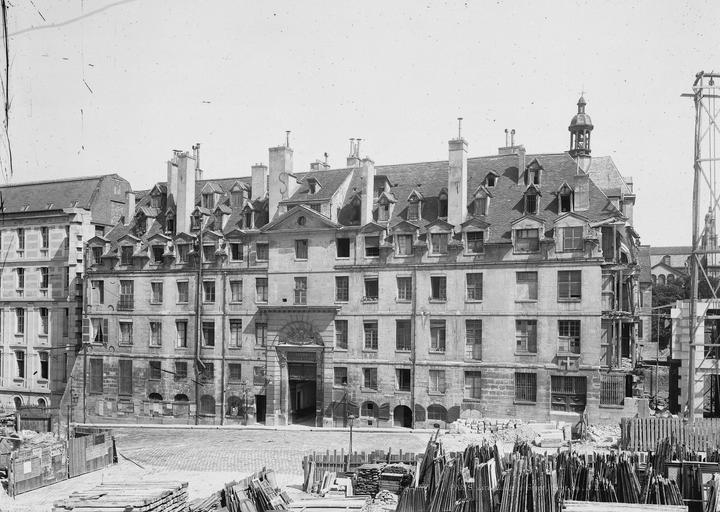
17th-century façade on rue Saint-Jacques shortly before demolition, early 1890s; the already finished northern section of the new façade is visible on the left

With the suppression of the Society of Jesus in France, the Jesuits were ordered to cease their teaching and leave the college on 3 May 1762. The establishment was immediately nationalized and renamed Collège royal Louis-le-Grand. Teachers from the nearby Collège de Lisieux replaced the Jesuit fathers as faculty. This change triggered a broader reform of the University of Paris. The scholarship students (French: boursiers) of twenty-six smaller colleges of the University of Paris, known as the petits collèges, were invited to follow classes at Louis-le-Grand. By 1764, these students also boarded at Louis-le-Grand. By then, the petits collèges effectively ceased autonomous activity, after which their property were gradually sold. Louis-le-Grand thus became the center of the university, even though ten other grands collèges survived until 1792. The nearby buildings of the Collège des Cholets, one of the petits collèges, were purchased by the monarchy in 1770 and repurposed as headquarters (French: chef-lieu) of the University of Paris. Meanwhile, by 1764 the former faculty of the Collège de Beauvais took over teaching at Louis-le-Grand from those of the Collège de Lisieux. Between then and the French Revolution, there were about 190 boursiers every year at Louis-le-Grand, and a smaller number of pensionnaires whose families paid for their boarding.

As a broader consequence of the Jesuits' termination, the French state in 1766 initiated the Aggregation examination to raise the standards of teaching in secondary education. Louis-le-Grand aspired to a leading position in supplying future agrégés. Its ambitions failed to materialize, however, as only nine of its boursiers succeeded in the Agrégation exams between 1766 and 1792, out of a total of 206 successful candidates during that period.

During and after the French Revolution, the college was renamed several times in response to France's changing politics: Collège Égalité in January 1793, Institut central des boursiers in 1797, Prytanée français in July 1798, Lycée de Paris in 1803, Lycée impérial in 1805, Lycée Louis-le-Grand in 1814, Collège royal de Louis le Grand again in 1815, modified to Collège royal Louis-le-Grand in 1831, Lycée Descartes in 1848, Lycée Louis-le-Grand once again in 1849, Lycée impérial Louis-le-Grand in 1853, again Lycée Descartes in 1870, and finally again Lycée Louis-le-Grand in 1873. It has kept that name ever since.

Throughout the troubled 1790s, it was the only Parisian educational institution that remained continuously open, as it had been during the 1590s siege of Paris. Part of its premises, however, were used as barracks for soldiers, then as political prison and workshops. In 1796, three more écoles centrales opened in Paris, respectively in the former Abbey of Saint Genevieve (école centrale du Panthéon, later Lycée Henri-IV), the Professed House of the Jesuits (école centrale de la rue Saint-Antoine, later Lycée Charlemagne), and the Collège des Quatre-Nations (école centrale des Quatre-Nations).

=== 1804-1900 ===
The latter building, however, was repurposed in 1801 for artistic training, and its secondary school was relocated to the Collège du Plessis adjacent to Louis-le-Grand then known as the Prytanée (école centrale du Plessis), then merged into it in 1804. In 1803, Napoleon created the Lycée Condorcet in the former couvent des Capucins de la Chaussée d’Antin, and in 1820, another new lycée took the premises of the former Collège d'Harcourt, now the Lycée Saint-Louis. Louis-le-Grand was thus one of only five public lycées in Paris for most of the 19th century, until Jules Ferry's reforms greatly expanded secondary education in the 1880s.

Bordering Louis-le-Grand to the north, some of the buildings of the former Collège du Plessis were partly used by the École normale from 1810 to 1814 and again from 1826 to 1847, after which it moved to its present campus designed by architect Alphonse de Gisors on rue d'Ulm. Others parts of the Plessis complex were temporarily awarded to the Paris University's Faculty of Letters and a section of the Faculty of Law, but were demolished in 1833 as they had become derelict. During the early Second Republic, an école d'Administration opened in July 1848 on the École Normale's former location, promoted by politician Hippolyte Carnot, but it met overwhelming opposition and ceased operating after about six months. Louis-le-Grand eventually acquired the remaining Plessis buildings in May 1849 and tore them down in 1864. Meanwhile, in 1822, Louis-le-Grand had expanded southwards by taking over the former Collège des Cholets from the university. Louis-le-Grand's main buildings themselves were in an increasingly dilapidated state, implying danger for the students. From the 1840s onwards multiple attempts were made to start their reconstructions, but faltered for several decades. In the mid-1860s, Georges-Eugène Haussmann promoted a project to move Louis-le-Grand to the premises of the hôpital des incurables on rue de Sèvres, but that initiative was short-lived and the complex on rue de Sèvres was instead repurposed a decade later as Hôpital Laennec.

Four days after the anarchist 9 March 1883 demonstration, the Lycée Louis-le-Grand revolted, and the high school students barricaded themselves inside the building at the instigation of their 'anarchist morals', according to the press of the time. The army intervened in the high school to 'restore order', and hundreds of students were expelled.

Eventually, Louis-le-Grand was almost entirely reconstructed between 1885 and 1898 on a design by architect Charles Le Cœur, on a complex schedule so that teaching activities could continue during the works, and at a record high cost. Le Coeur's design only preserved the northern and southern sides of the inner court (now cour d'honneur) from the earlier college facilities. He created two vast courtyards to the north (Cour Molière) and south (Cour Victor-Hugo) of that central space, with multiple levels of classrooms connected by airy arcaded corridors. That rebuilding project took place the context of broader urban remodeling of the neighborhood around rue Saint-Jacques, also including the rebuilding of the Sorbonne (1884–1901, architect Henri Paul Nénot) and the extension of what is now the Panthéon campus of Paris 2 Panthéon-Assas University (1891–1897, architect Ernest Lheureux).

=== 20th and 21st centuries ===
During World War I, the neighborhood was hit by Paris Gun shells, known to Parisians as la grosse Bertha. One shell tore through the ceiling of the main entrance hall on 24 March 1918, and another left a large hole in the pavement of rue Saint-Jacques in front of the lycée's entrance on 27 May 1918. During World War II, Jacques Lusseyran founded the resistance group Volontaires de la Liberté, in which a number of his fellow Louis-le-Grand students participated.

The last significant new building project was a new auditorium (French: salle des fêtes), located in the southeastern corner of the premises and completed in the late 1950s.

Louis-le-Grand had its share of May 68 turmoil and subsequent violence between far-left and far-right student factions. On 18 May 1968, it hosted the general assembly of the high-school students' action committees (Comité d'action lycéen) which called for a general strike. On 23 April 1969 Jean Tiberi, a gaullist member of parliament who would later become the mayor of Paris, was assaulted during a visit of the lycée. A hand grenade exploded inside its premises in early May 1969.

A collection of the school's old scientific instruments was curated from 1972 and is now managed autonomously as the Musée Scientifique du lycée Louis-le-Grand.

== Operations ==
Louis-le-Grand has about 1,800 students, nearly a tenth of which are non-French from more than 40 countries. About half of these are enrolled in high school, and the other half in the classes préparatoires. Its boarding capacity is of 340 inside the building.

Together with its longstanding rival the Lycée Henri-IV, Louis-le-Grand has long been the only French lycée that is exempted from the scheme of location-based enrollment known as the Carte scolaire, even after the introduction in 2008 of the nationwide application known as Affelnet. This exemption has been criticized as a breach of territorial equality and a device for the self-perpetuation of French elites. It was decided to reform it in 2022.

== Notable alumni ==
Louis-le-Grand has long been considered to play an important role in the education of French elites. In 1762, just before the college's nationalization, scholar Jean-Baptiste-Jacques Élie de Beaumont wrote: "The Jesuit College of Paris has for a long time been a state nursery, the most fertile in great men." Many of its former students have become influential statesmen, diplomats, prelates, writers, artists, intellectuals and scientists.

It counts seven Nobel Prize laureates as alumni, second only to the Bronx High School of Science in New York City, one Nobel Memorial Prize in Economic Sciences and six Fields Medal winners. The Louis-le-Grand alumni laureates are, by chronological order of prize-winning: Frédéric Passy (Peace, 1901); Henri Becquerel (Physics, 1903); Charles Louis Alphonse Laveran (Medicine, 1907); Paul d'Estournelles de Constant (Peace, 1909); Romain Rolland (Literature, 1915); Jean-Paul Sartre (Literature, 1964); Maurice Allais (Memorial Prize in Economic Sciences, 1988); and Serge Haroche (Physics, 2012).

Other notable alumni include:

- statesmen the Cardinal de Fleury, the Duc de Choiseul, the Cardinal de Bernis, the Chancelier de Maupeou, Charles Carroll of Carrollton, Maximilien Robespierre, Camille Desmoulins, Victor Schœlcher, Jean Jaurès, Édouard Herriot, Edgard Pisani, Léopold Sédar Senghor, Jacques de Larosière, Paul Biya; seven French presidents (Raymond Poincaré, Paul Deschanel, Alexandre Millerand, Alain Poher acting, Georges Pompidou, Valéry Giscard d'Estaing and Jacques Chirac); and eight Prime Ministers (Paul Painlevé, Pierre Mendès France, Michel Debré, Maurice Couve de Murville, Pierre Messmer, Laurent Fabius, Michel Rocard, Alain Juppé)
- scientists Évariste Galois, Charles Hermite, Henri Poincaré, Jacques Hadamard, Benoit Mandelbrot, Laurent Schwartz, Laurent Lafforgue, Cédric Villani, Hugo Duminil-Copin
- writers Molière, Bussy-Rabutin, the Marquis de Sade, Victor Hugo, Théophile Gautier, Charles Baudelaire, Paul Claudel, Joseph Kessel, Roland Barthes, Aimé Césaire
- philosophers and social scientists Voltaire, Denis Diderot, Emile Durkheim, Gaston Maspero, Marc Bloch, Julien Benda, Georges Dumézil, Jacques Derrida, Jacques Le Goff, Régis Debray, Thomas Piketty
- artists Eugène Delacroix, Théodore Géricault, Frédéric Auguste Bartholdi, Gustave Caillebotte (at the Petit Collège in Vanves), Edgar Degas, Pierre Bonnard, Georges Méliès, Jean-Paul Belmondo
- business leaders André Citroën, André Michelin, Michel Pébereau, Jean-Charles Naouri, Frédéric Arnault
- military leaders Maxime Weygand, Henri Honoré d'Estienne d'Orves
- religious figures Francis de Sales, Pierre de Bérulle, the Cardinal de Retz, Dalil Boubakeur

== Offshoots ==
=== Gentilly estate (1638–1770) ===
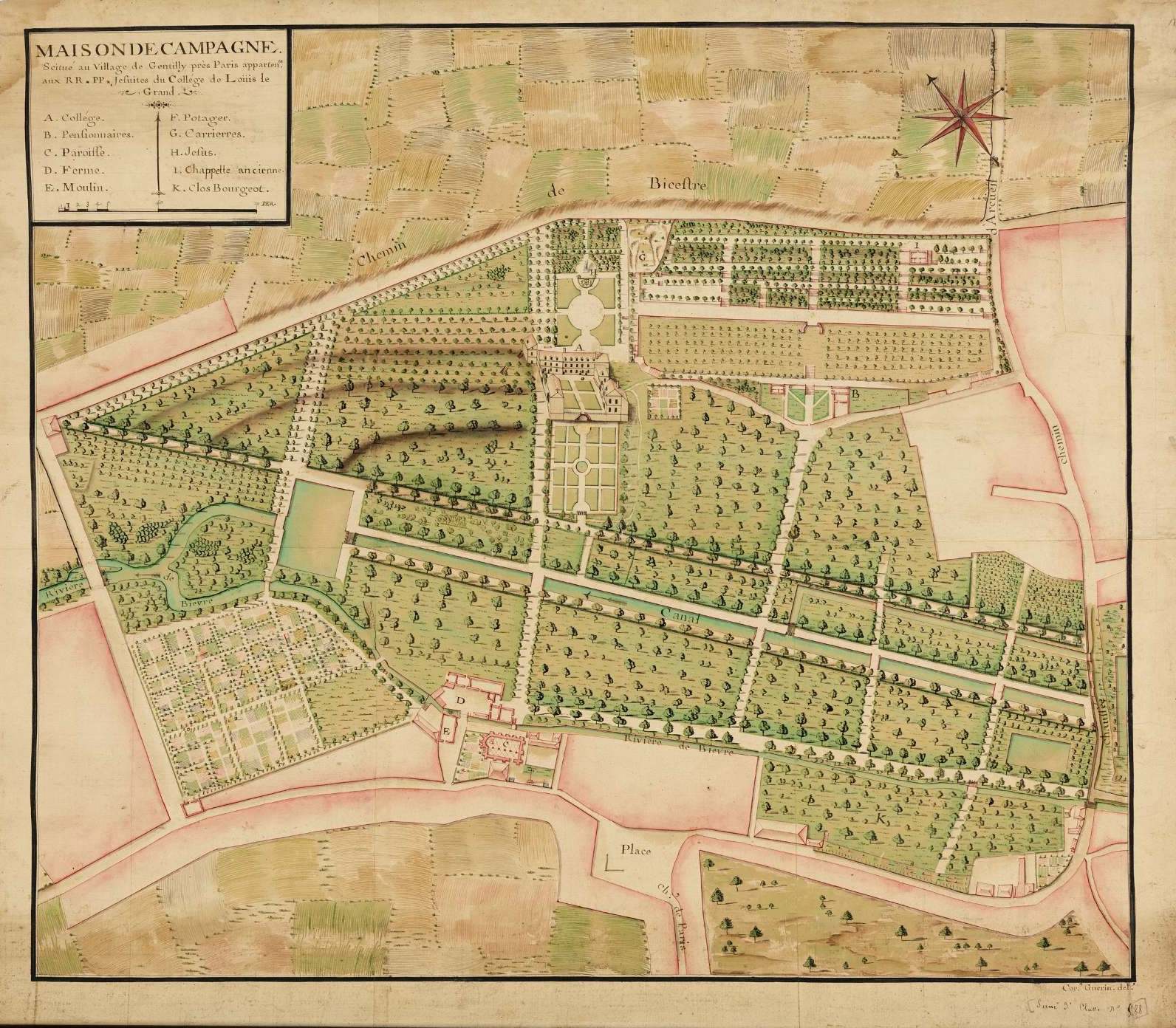
Map of the Jesuits' estate or maison de campagne in Gentilly, 18th century

The Collège de Clermont made a series of purchases in Gentilly to establish a rural retreat there, in 1632, 1638, 1640 and 1659, thus forming a major property that was eventually sold after the order's suppression in the early 1770s. One of its buildings survives and has been repurposed in the 1990s as the Maison de la photographie Robert Doisneau.

=== Petit collège in Vanves (1853–1864) ===
In 1798, Louis-le-Grand (then known as Prytanée) acquired the former grounds of the Château de Vanves. In the 1840s it initiated the project of establishing there an annex, known as the petit collège. In 1853 this became the sole location of its petites classes or middle school. The facilities were expanded in 1858–1860 on a design by Joseph-Louis Duc. It became an independent establishment by imperial decree in August 1864, known since 1888 as the Lycée Michelet.

=== Petit lycée on the Jardin du Luxembourg (1885–1891) ===
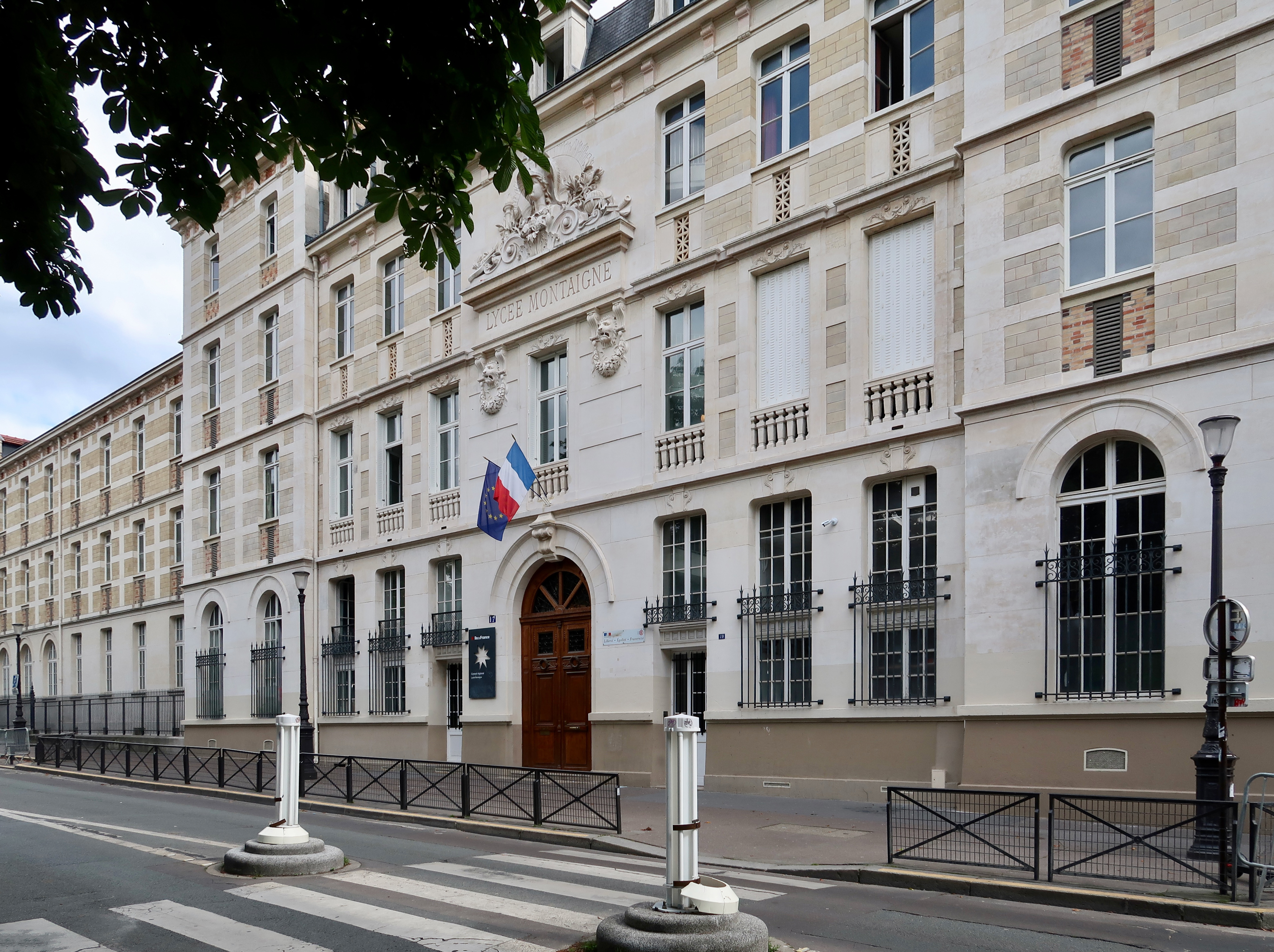
Former petit lycée Louis-le-Grand, now Lycée Montaigne

In 1882, a law awarded a former tree nursery ground of the Jardin du Luxembourg to Louis-le-Grand for the creation of new classrooms, in anticipation of the main building's reconstruction. The new petit lycée, also designed by Charles Le Cœur, opened in 1885 and became independent in August 1891 as the Lycée Montaigne.

=== Abu Dhabi Section (2008–2017) ===
In September 2008, Louis-le-Grand and the Abu Dhabi Education Council launched the Advanced Math and Science Pilot Class, with one class of 20 girls and another of 20 boys. Classes were taught in English in Abu Dhabi, by professors sent from France. The students who made up the Advanced Math and Science Pilot Class graduated at the end of the 12th grade and were awarded a certificate of academic recognition by Louis-le-Grand. The final cohort of the program graduated in 2017, marking the end of the program.

== Gallery ==
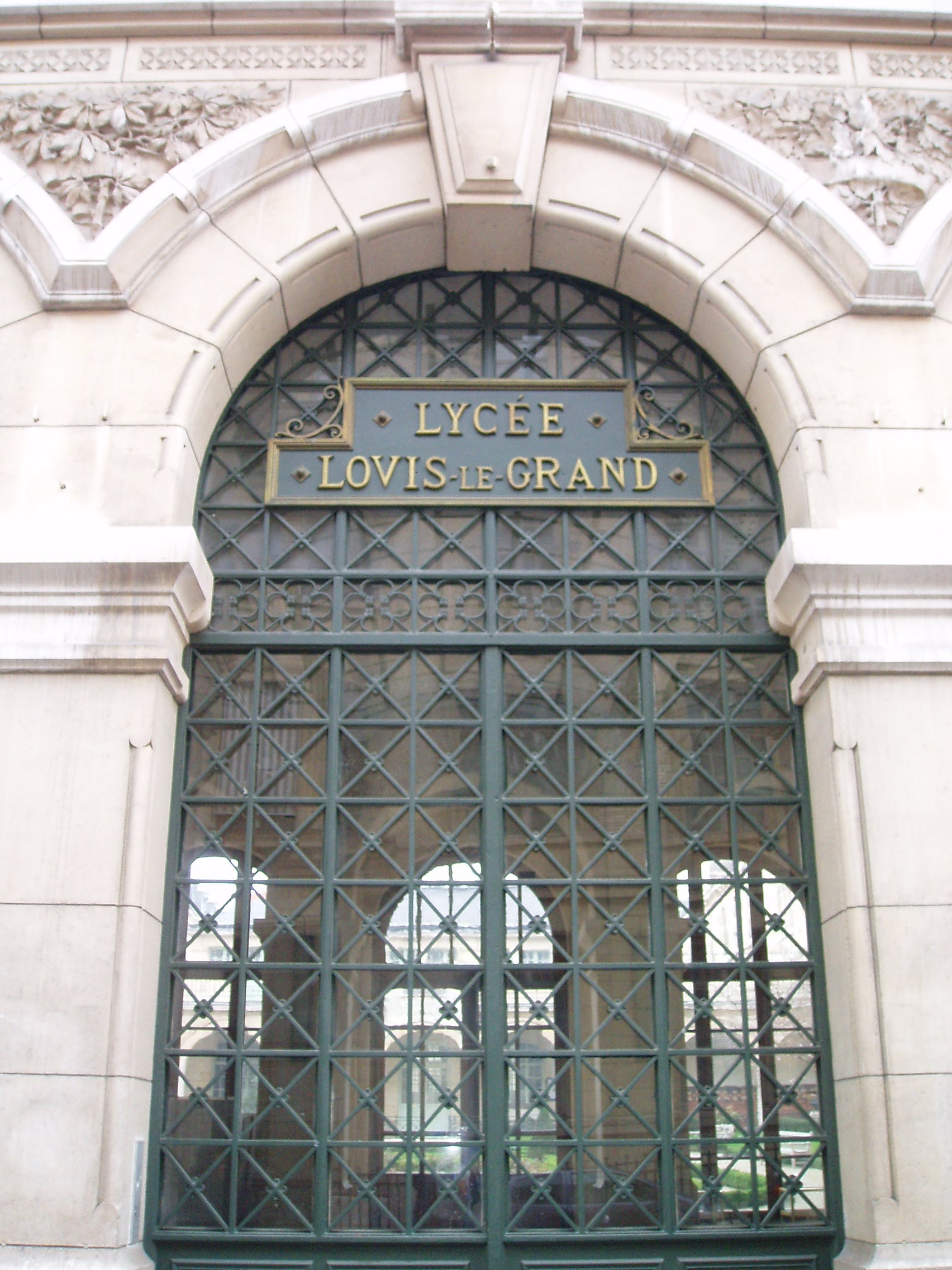
Front side on rue Saint-Jacques

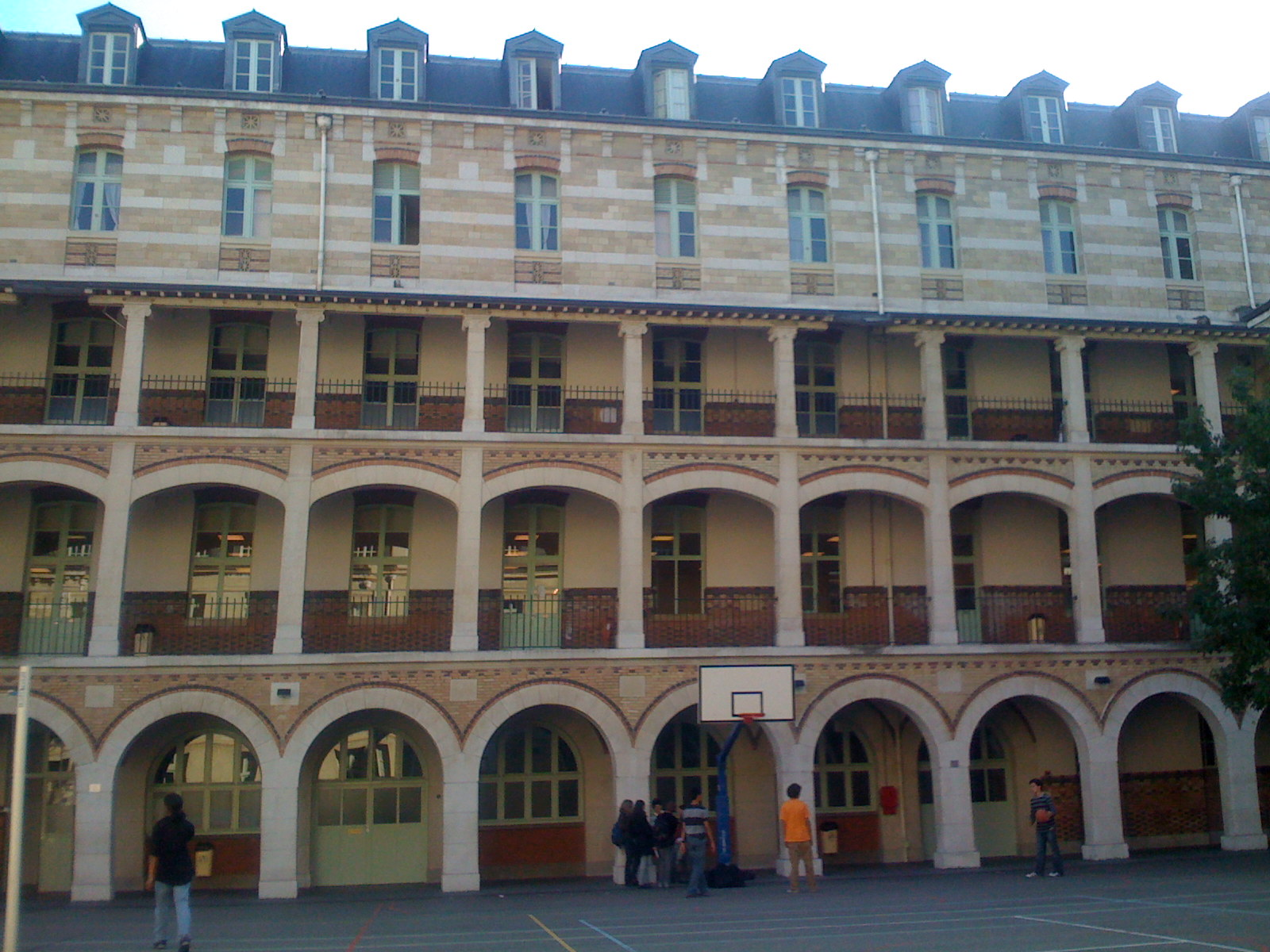
Cour Victor Hugo

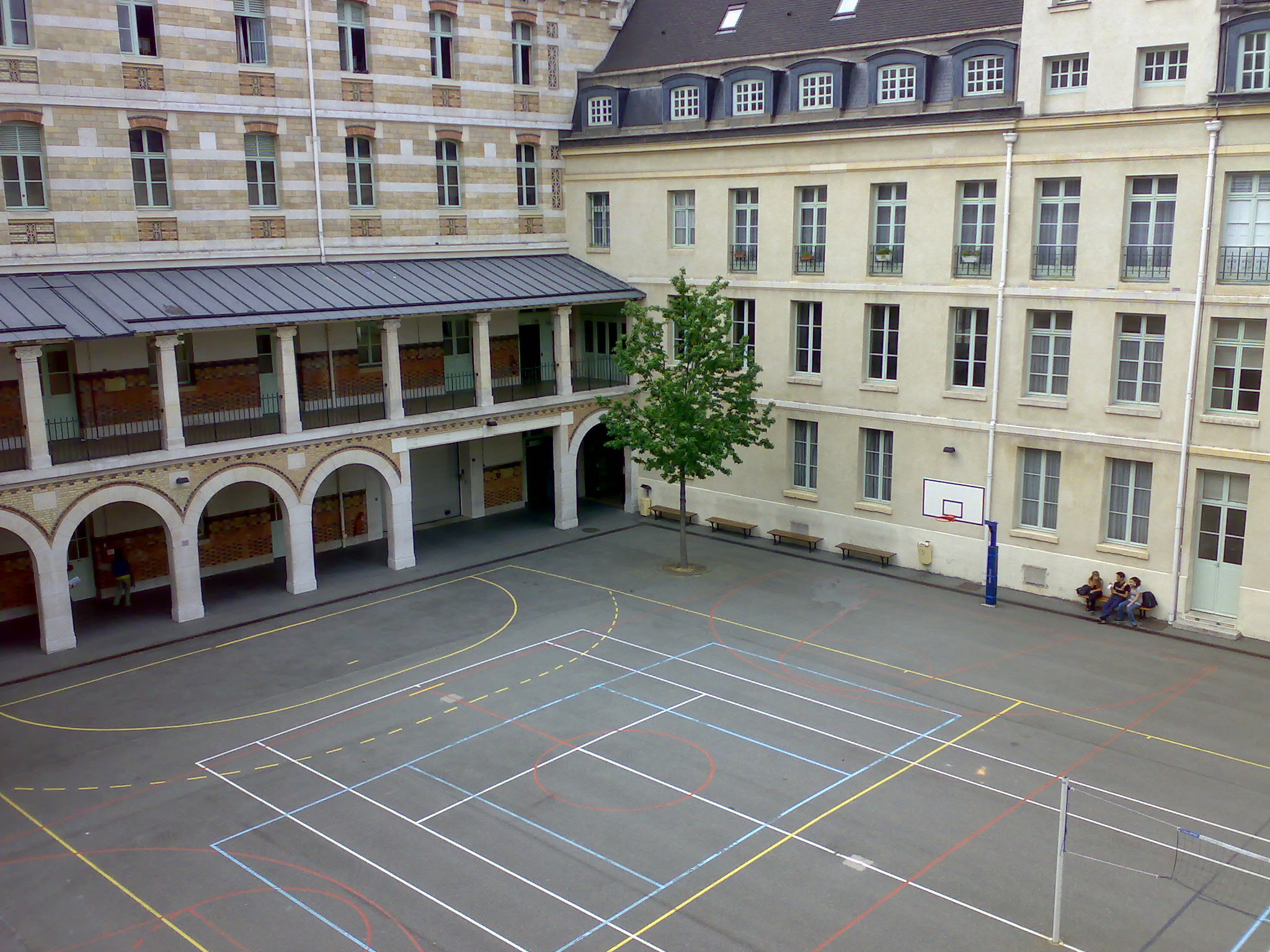
Cour Victor Hugo

Cour Molière

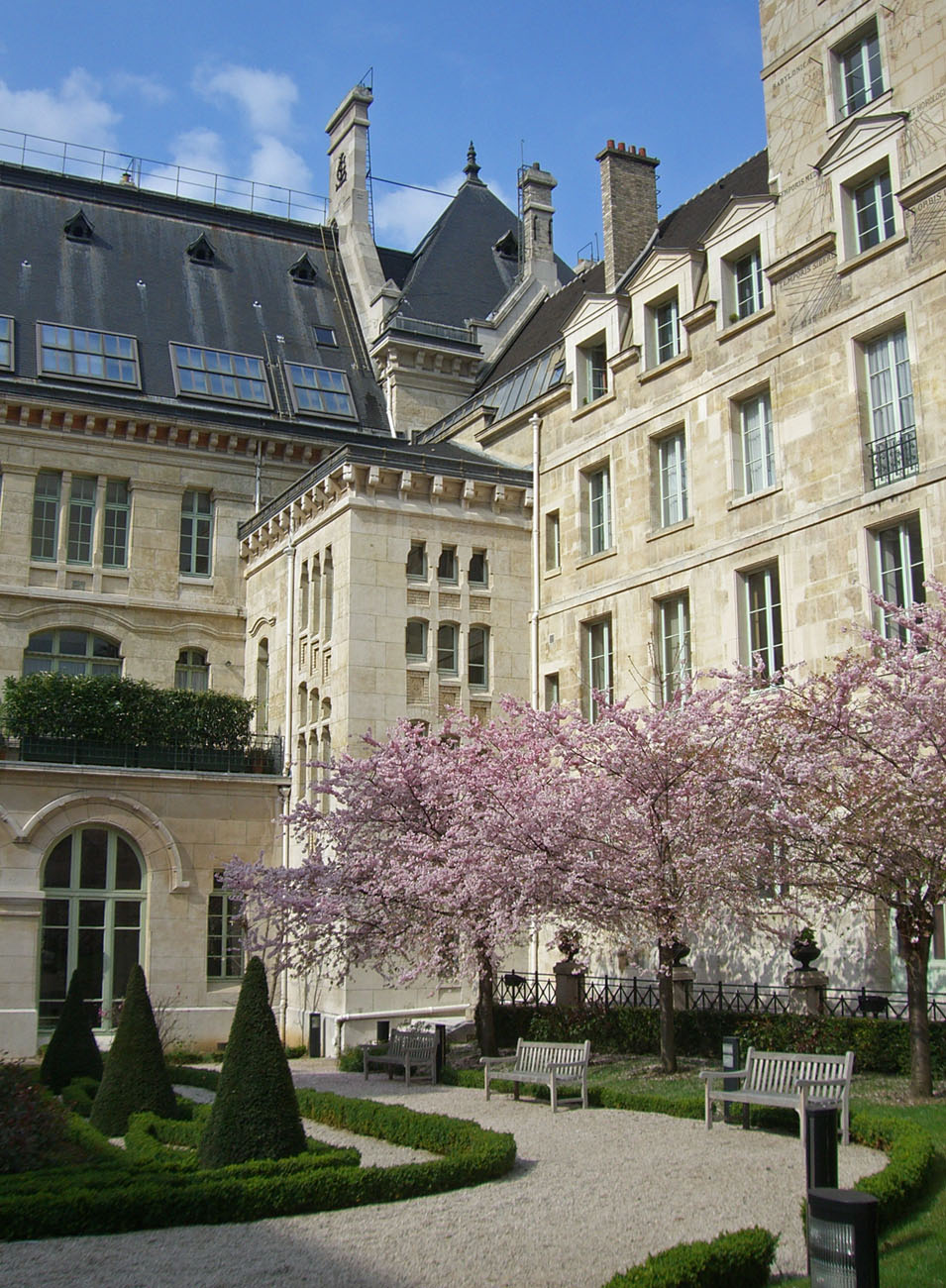
Cour d'Honneur

== See also ==
- List of Lycée Louis-le-Grand people
- List of Jesuit sites
- College of Navarre
- Lycée Henri-IV
- Secondary education in France
- List of schools in France
