= Jean-François Champagne =

French scholar (1751–1813)

Jean-François Champagne (1 July 1751 – 14 September 1813) was a French scholar.

He spent most of his life within the walls of the same academic institution, "Lycée Louis-le-Grand" in the heart of Paris, as pupil when a teenager, then as simple teacher, and grew to be its first Head Teacher, while in parallel that establishment evolved from a medley of various private and mostly religious educational foundations under the reigns of Louis XV and Louis XVI into the prototype model of highest level colleges in the French educational system, that emerged in the turmoil of the Revolution years from the educational dreams of the new ruling middle class and took its fundamental properties in the early Empire days ("Lycée").

Through the difficult years of the French Revolution, he contrived in keeping open the Lycée Louis-le-Grand, a unique case for institutions of that type.

Also notable for some academic work as Hellenist, acknowledged translator of ancient Greek writings, and distinguished as member of the Académie des inscriptions et belles-lettres, he was closely linked to a transient personality of the Revolution years, Pierre Henri Hélène Marie Lebrun-Tondu, as of his real name TONDU, also known as LEBRUN or TONDU-LEBRUN, who grew to be Minister of Foreign Affairs for one year (August 1792–June 1793) and ultimately fell a victim to the Terror period instated by Robespierre and his friends.

== Biography ==
=== Youth and training for educational career ===
Born in 1751 in the small city of Semur-en-Auxois in Burgundy, he got there his early terms of education, certainly with some brilliancy, as he was selected by local powers-that-be to pursue them from his very early teens on at "Louis-le-Grand", already then a famous educational compound in the center of Paris that was at that time, under the reigns of Louis XV and Louis XVI, organized as a medley of various private and mostly religious educational foundations, where pupils were funded by powers-that-be of high noble rank or of religious standing (such as abbeys or bishops), for example the "collège Dainville" (also designated sometimes as the "collège d'Inville"), that was patronized by the Chapter of the Cathedral of Noyon (61 Oise, France).

The "collège Louis-le-Grand" happened in the three decades preceding the French Revolution to be the mold of education of will-be prime players in that world-changing period: universally-known Maximilien Robespierre and Camille Desmoulins, but also Pierre Henri Hélène Marie Lebrun-Tondu (later known as Minister of Foreign Affairs of the First French Republic, from August 1792 till June 1793, under the name of LEBRUN or of LEBRUN-TONDU), all born, like Jean-François Champagne, in the 1750s and early 1760s decade, underwent there most of their education, but as well many promising students with high hopes and perspectives in the sciences, who for example later on joined the Observatoire de Paris, that entertained several research departments of various types (including Mathematics), under the lead of the successive Cassinis, for the which careers "Louis-le-Grand" was a kind of antechamber.

Beneficiary of a scholarship grant from his home town, he stayed at Louis-le-Grand as a pupil from 1767 till 1778, then followed up as a simple teacher, then Head teacher for the 6th grade class and probably in succession higher grades. He took up a statute as religious ("Louis–le-Grand" was then under the supervision of the Company of Jesus), and became a deacon, a natural path for those who considered teaching careers in those days (Lebrun-Tondu, three years younger than Champagne, followed pretty much the same path until his mid twenties; they were closely linked as events would reveal in 1794).

All those steps prepared what should have been a regular, stolid and uneventful educational career. However the great tide of the French Revolution was to change that, as for many others. Around mid 1791, collateral effects of the French Revolution then in full gear-up up bearing on the religious communities that steered the college brought about Champagne’s nomination as Head of the College. He steered it in a uniquely successful way throughout the ensuing 20 years.

=== Steering "Louis-le-Grand" through the Revolution years ===
He had been a teacher about ten years when the Revolution came (1789); in the ensuing two years, senior colleagues, most of whom with a religious grade of some sort, resigned and quit their positions, but Champagne remained and thus became Head Teacher on 3 May 1791.

A circumstantial Head Teacher, he revealed himself a providential guide for the Lycée Louis-Le-Grand through the French Revolution turmoil. Keeping a firm hand on what remained of the initial College, he steered it through the changes and hazards of that extraordinary period.

First of all, playing on all his links with the new and rapidly changing powers (he became an active member of the Comité révolutionnaire, section Panthéon-Français), he contrived to remain constantly confirmed in his role as Head of the institution, while it underwent a succession of names and organizational changes: "Collège Égalité" (1793), "Institut des Boursiers Égalité" (1796), "Prytanée Français" (1798), "Collège de Paris" (1800), "Lycée de Paris" (1803) and finally "Lycée Impérial" (1804).

The originally privately funded institution was deprived of all its properties and own sources of revenues; no allocation was attributed it for quite some time, and he was barely able to feed his pupils. The site was requisitioned at several occasions and for diverse purposes, even serving as a jail for part of its premises in 1793; notwithstanding all hazards and all enmities and attempts at appropriation, Champagne succeeded in keeping the school open for a remainder of students (the older ones having been sent to join the Revolutionary Army from 1792 on, even as late as 1796) throughout the times, a unique "tour de force" without any equivalent from any institution of that type during that period in France.

In January 1794, he definitely abandoned his cleric status to marry the widow of his co-disciple and friend Pierre Hélène Tondu, executed in late December 1793 under orders of Robespierre, this latter himself onetime pupil at Louis-le-Grand like Tondu and Champagne, and who execrated Tondu. Together with the widow, he took on the charge of the six children of Tondu, who had entrusted them unto his care in a letter written a few hours before being sent to the guillotine, all boys to be educated in that same Louis-le-Grand where they took their abode with their father-in-law.

=== Head Teacher of the prototype best-in-class "Lycée Impérial" ===
The advent of the Napoleon years brought a total reversal to these hardships. Tuition and education became again a priority of the State; Louis-le-Grand became the model of all high school levels institutions according to the new concepts introduced under the Consulate and Empire early years, and was designated as "le Prytanée Français"; former pupils became teachers and heads of like establishments that arose in all large cities, the “lycées impériaux”.

For 15 years, Champagne served as the exemplary Head Teacher of Louis-le-Grand. Widely recognized, he moved from survival mode to model firmness, order and method, and ruled undisputed for an additional 10 years over the revamped Louis-le-Grand, where discipline and application to work were master words. From 1801 on, the private confinement “cells” of the school, where rebellious or insufficiently motivated pupils were detained on bread and water only, were booked 100% on a permanent basis, to the point that in 1803, Champagne requested an extension of their numbers to meet a 1% ratio of the pupils’ population.

In parallel, Champagne at last has some enough spare time and energy to pursue some personal accomplishments, especially in ancient Greece literature and academics. He entered the "Institut de France, classe des Sciences morales et politiques" in 1795, and even dabbled with politics, getting elected to the Conseil des Cinq-Cents, although it seems he never actually sat.

By 1810, ailing health led to his more or less voluntary retirement from the position and premises that had been his scope for 50 years. He died three years later on September 14, 1813, in Paris.

== Distinctions ==
- Member of Académie des inscriptions et belles-lettres (1797)
- Member of Légion d'honneur

== Main published works ==
- La Politique d'Aristote, ou la science des gouvernements : ouvrage traduit du grec, avec des notes historiques et critiques, par le citoyen Champagne, 2 volumes, 1797
- Vues sur l'organisation de l'instruction publique dans les écoles destinées à l'enseignement de la jeunesse, par le citoyen Champagne, 1799–1800
- Sur l'Éducation. Notions générales qui peuvent et doivent être adaptées à tous les degrés d'instruction, 1802
- La Mer libre, la Mer fermée, ou Exposition et analyse du traité de Grotius intitulé la Mer libre et de la réplique de Selden intitulée la Mer fermée, 1803

== Notes and references ==
- Pierre Henri Hélène Marie Lebrun-Tondu
- Robespierre
- Camille Desmoulins

== Sources ==
- Louis Gabriel Michaud, Biographie universelle, ancienne et moderne, p. 392-395
- Web Site of "Lycée Louis-le-Grand"
