= Criquetot-l'Esneval =

- Commune
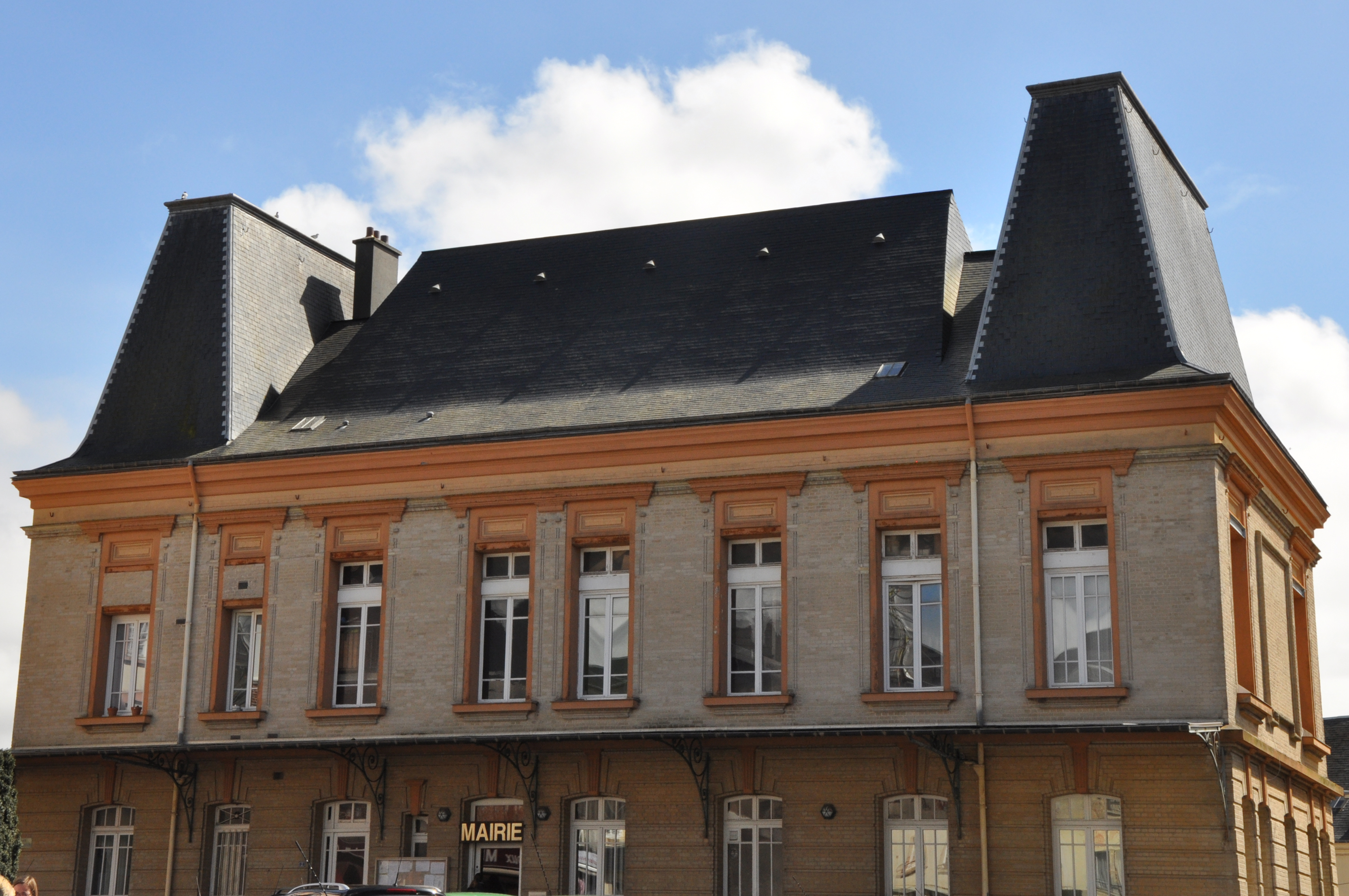
- Town hall
- Location of Criquetot-l'Esneval
- Location within France Location within Normandy
- Coordinates: 49°38′40″N 0°16′01″E
- Country: France
- Region: Normandy
- Department: Seine-Maritime
- Arrondissement: Le Havre
- Canton: Octeville-sur-Mer
- Intercommunality: Le Havre Seine Métropole

Government
  - Mayor (2020–2026): Alain Fleuret
- Area^{1}: 13.47 km^{2} (5.20 sq mi)
- Elevation: 122 m (400 ft)
- Highest elevation: 136 m (446 ft)
- Lowest elevation: 94 m (308 ft)
- Population (2023): 2,668
  - Density: 198.1/km^{2} (513.0/sq mi)
- Time zone: UTC+01:00 (CET)
  - Summer (DST): UTC+02:00 (CEST)
- INSEE/Postal code: 76196 /76280
- ^{1} French Land Register data, which excludes lakes, ponds, glaciers > 1 km^{2} (0.386 sq mi or 247 acres) and river estuaries.

Criquetot-l'Esneval (French pronunciation: [kʁikto lɛnval]) is a commune in the Seine-Maritime department in the Normandy region in northern France. The physician and erudite Louis-Henri Baratte was born in Criquetot-l'Esneval in 1803.

== Geography ==
A small farming town situated in the Pays de Caux, some 15 miles (24 km) northeast of Le Havre, at the junction of the D139, D239 and D79 roads.

== Population ==
Historical population
Year	Pop.	±% p.a.
1968	1,253	—
1975	1,386	+1.45%
1982	1,663	+2.64%
1990	1,979	+2.20%
1999	2,149	+0.92%
2007	2,249	+0.57%
2012	2,367	+1.03%
2017	2,567	+1.64%
2023	2,668	+0.65%
Source: INSEE

== Places of interest ==
- The two 16th century manorhouses.
- The church of Notre-Dame, dating from the eleventh century.

== See also ==
- Communes of the Seine-Maritime department
