= Volontaires de la Liberté =

The Volontaires de la Liberté was a French resistance group founded in May 1941. Consisting of school boys and led by Jacques Lusseyran, the group's activities consisted initially of propaganda; it published a bulletin that agitated against the Nazi occupation and the regime of Vichy France. After the Service du travail obligatoire, the Compulsory Work Service, was installed by the Nazis in February 1943 the group's size increased and it dispersed, in part due to ideological differences, many members joining the larger, militant Défense de la France to engage in armed combat. Others continued under the Volontaires name and aided other resistance organizations by sheltering downed Allied pilots.

== History ==
The group consisted of school boys (from the Lycée Louis-le-Grand and the Lycée Henri-IV) and university students from Paris. Its main founder was the blind student Jacques Lusseyran, and by the end of May 1941 the group had formed a central committee of eight students: Jean Besniée, Jean-Louis Bruch, Pierre Cochery, Jean-Claude Comert, Georges Guillemin, Jacques Lusseyran, Jacques Oudin and Jean Sennelier. Initially the group focused on ideology more than on armed combat, and published its first bulletin in October 1941. Between October 1941 and 1943, the bulletin was published 55 times, in circulations of between 50 and 1000 copies. (Note: One source lists 99 issues, all hectographed.) The bulletin contained news and theoretical articles, with essays on Nazism, democracy, and Marxism; its goal was in the words of Lusseyran, "to understand events and explain them."

Initially isolated, by 1942 the group had made contact with other resistance groups, and with the help of Maurice Lacroix, a teacher at Louis-le-Grand. It aided in the distribution of the Résistance, the clandestine paper edited by Marcel Renet, but the group experienced internal dissent after that paper published a pro-Franco article. Lusseyran was aiming for higher circulation, but others wished to stay true to the group's original anti-Pétain direction. A compromise was found in the publication of a second paper, Le Tigre, dedicated to Georges Clemenceau, which appeared seven times (between 500 and 2000 copies) until October 1942.

=== Organizational split ===
When the Service du travail obligatoire (STO), the Compulsory Work Service, was installed by the Nazis in February 1943 the group's size increased and dispersed, many members joining the larger, militant Défense de la France to engage in armed combat.

In the meantime Lusseyran had formed an alliance with Philippe Viannay, leader of the Défense de la France. This alliance came to a head in February 1943 when he decided the Volontaires should join the larger group while maintaining organizational independence; he soon found the desire for autonomy counterproductive and incorporated the entire group under the Défense. Especially Pierre Cochery was dissatisfied and the Volontaires split, with a smaller group led by Cochery focusing on clandestine operations like sabotaging the STO through falsifying census data and sheltering deserters. The Volontaires were now led by Cochery, Jean-Louis Bruch, André Darrouzet (arrested in August 1943), and Pierre Bigand (replacing Darrouzet), Jean-Claude Comert, and Yves Allain. They published a single issue of another bulletin, Le Quatrième République. The group worked with Libération-Nord starting in mid-1943, and afterward with Franc-Tireur, and aided the efforts of the Bourgogne group, for example through sheltering allied pilots. Members were arrested and deported, with casualties including Jean Besniée, Jean Sennelier, Pierre Bizos and Jacques Oudin (http://jacques-oudin-resistant.fr). Other members included Léon Delarbre.

== See also ==
- List of networks and movements of the French Resistance
