= Parabola (magazine) =

American cultural magazine

- Woman Vol. V, No. 4
- Publisher and editor: Jeff Zaleski
- Categories: Religious and cultural traditions
- Frequency: Quarterly (discontinued)
- Publisher: Society for the Study of Myth and Tradition
- Founder: Dorothea M. Dooling
- Founded: 1976
- First issue: Winter 1976
- Final issue Number: Spring 2025 (April); 50:1
- Country: U.S.
- Based in: New York City
- Language: English
- Website: www.parabola.org (offline)
- ISSN: 0362-1596

Parabola, also known as Parabola: The Search for Meaning, was a Manhattan-based quarterly magazine on the subjects of mythology and the world's religious and cultural traditions. Founder and editor Dorothea M. Dooling began publishing in 1976. It was published by The Society for the Study of Myth and Tradition, a not-for-profit organization.

== Title etymology ==
The name of the magazine is explained by the editors as follows:

The parabola represents the epitome of a quest. It is the metaphorical journey to a particular point, and then back home, along a similar path perhaps, but in a different direction, after which the traveler is essentially, irrevocably changed.

== Subtitle changes ==
The magazine's subtitle has changed over the years. In its first years, it was Parabola: Myth and the Quest for Meaning, then Parabola: The Magazine of Myth and Tradition, later Parabola: Myth, Tradition, and the Search for Meaning, Parabola: Myth, Tradition, and the Search for Meaning, Parabola: Where Spiritual Traditions Meet, and its current title as of October 2019, Parabola: The Search for Meaning.

== Issues and subjects ==
Each issue focuses on a particular subject, with each article related to the main subject. The subjects of the first five years' issues included creation, relationships, death, magic and hero mythology.

== Featured authors ==
Authors contributing articles to Parabola are listed as contributing editors, and include Joseph Campbell, Ursula K. Le Guin, Mircea Eliade, Jacob Needleman, Thomas Moore, Christmas Humphries, William Irwin Thompson, Isaac Bashevis Singer, David Rosenberg, P. L. Travers, Jane Yolen, Robert Lawlor, Pablo Neruda, Keith Critchlow, Elaine Pagels, James Hillman, Robert Bly, Gary Snyder, David Abram, John Shirley, Howard Schwartz, Italo Calvino, David Rothenberg, John Anthony West, and many others in the fields of Jungian psychology, spirituality, ecology and the aforementioned subjects. The journal also publishes interviews with many of the same figures, as well as reviews of books in these fields.

== Closure ==
On April 4, 2025, the editors of Parabola announced that the journal was being discontinued, saying "The financial challenges posed by today’s publishing environment have proven insurmountable." Stephen Schiff, Chairman of the Board of the Society for the Study of Myth and Tradition, wrote "We are a casualty of the market forces to which so many other periodicals have succumbed." The website remained active until the end of April 2025 and subscribers were allowed to download an unlimited number of PDF back issues free of charge. The Society then closed the website, which has been taken over by Études Architectural Solutions.

== Related materials ==
In addition to the journal, Parabola at one time also produced books, recordings and videos, including And There Was Light, by Jacques Lusseyran; Sons of the Wind: the Sacred Stories of the Lakota; I Become Part of It: the Sacred Dimensions in Native American Life, edited by D. M. Dooling and Paul Jordan-Smith; The Bestiary of Christ by Louis Charbonneau-Lassay and D. M. Dooling; A Way of Working, edited by D. M. Dooling; as well as the extended video The Power of Myth, Bill Moyers's interview with Joseph Campbell.
