= Chems-Eddine Hafiz =

Franco-Algerian lawyer

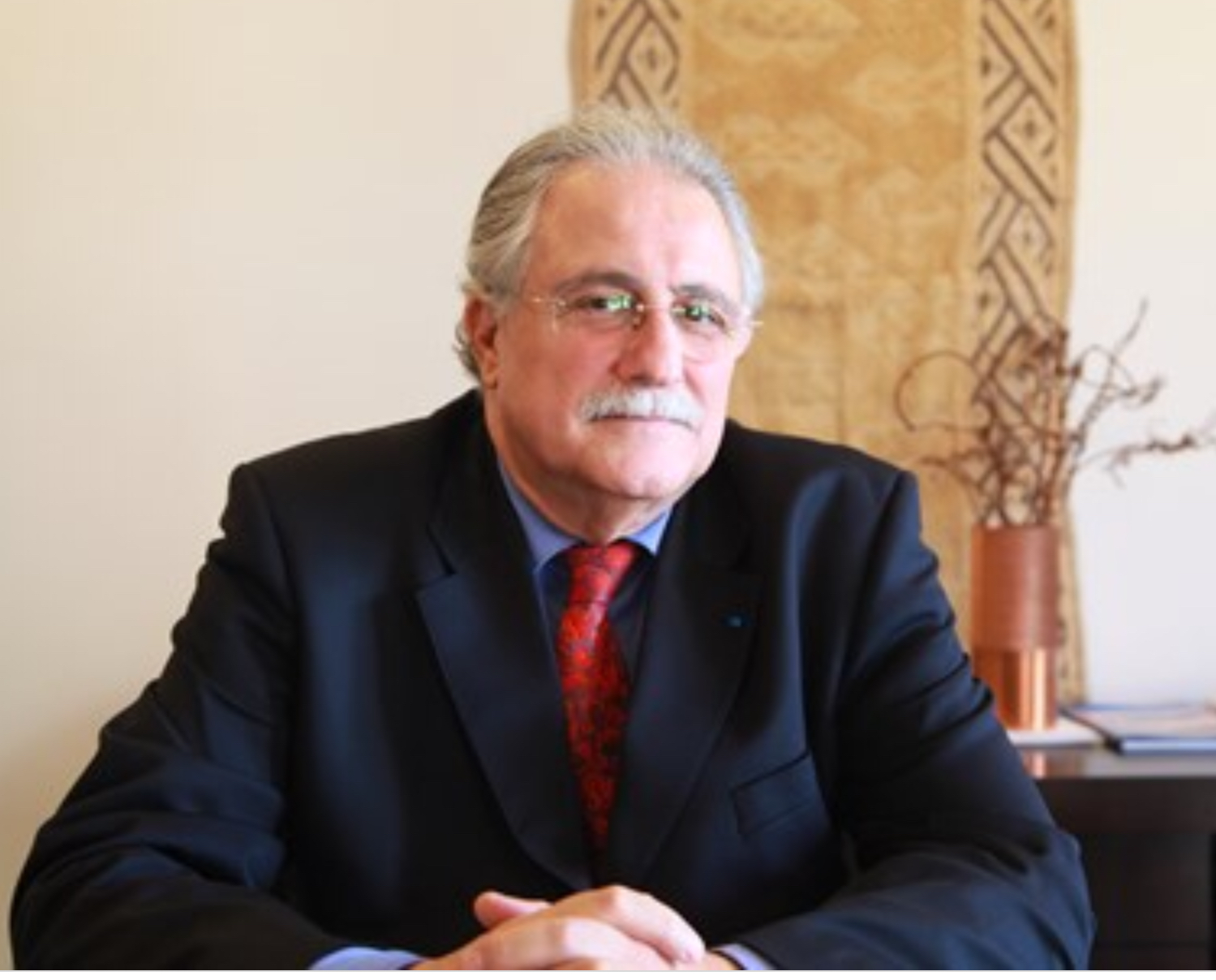
Chems-Eddine Hafiz

Chems-eddine Mohamed Hafiz (born 28 June 1954 in Algiers) is a Franco-Algerian lawyer. Since 11 January 2020, he has served as rector of the Grand Mosque of Paris.

He is a member of the Commission nationale consultative des droits de l'homme (CNCDH).

== Biography ==
On 17 March 1986, Chems-eddine Hafiz became a lawyer at the Court of Algiers, and participated in the creation of the Union of young lawyers of the bar of Algiers.

On 13 February 1991, he enrolled at the Paris bar and specialized in international business law, particularly between the Maghreb and Arab countries, as well as criminal law.

He pleaded at the assizes. First, the Khouas case, named after the young Mohamed Khouas, shot dead on May 5, 1996 by two brothers, Eric and Yann Beaufrère at the foot of his building, Cité des Chaillots, in Sens, in Yonne. He was 19 and had just obtained his baccalaureate. Then, the Sohane Benziane case, named after the young girl discovered inanimate on October 4, 2002, seriously burned, in a garbage room in the city of Balzac, in Vitry-sur-Seine in Val-de-Marne. She died in hospital aged just 17.

In 1998, he became advisor to the Grand Mosque of Paris, which he represented alongside Rector Dalil Boubakeur on the occasion of the "consultation" (Istichâra) launched by Minister of the Interior Jean-Pierre Chevènement.

== Community life ==
Chems-eddine Hafiz is president of the association Vivre l´islam, producer of a programm on the France channel 2, every Sunday morning, of the program Islam. In 2001, within the Paris bar, he created the Association of Algerian Lawyers in France, which brought together lawyers from Algeria. In 2008, he changed its name to the Euro-Maghreb Association of Business Lawyers (AEMADA). He has been its honorary president since 2013. He speaks regularly about the Algerian legal space through his blogs, dedicated to the Paris-Algiers commission of the Paris bar and the AEMADA. In 2013, he was appointed by the Bar of the Paris Court of Appeal responsible for the international Paris-Alger commission.

Following the November 2015 Paris attack, he created with lawyers from the Paris bar the Association the fraternity of the Paris bar, bringing together lawyers of various denominations. This association organized meetings at the Mosque of Paris, at the Synagogue de la Victoire, at Notre-Dame de Paris and at the Oratoire du Louvre.

In April 2020, he co-founded with Xavier Emmanuelli, the association Les Vendredis de la Connaissance, (knowledge Fridays), with the aim of organizing popular universities on issues of society and religion.

He chairs the association Les Bâtisseurs des mosques de France)Mosque builders(), which aims to pay tribute and make known the history of those who built the Muslim religious heritage of France.

== Muslim faith ==
From May 2003 to March 2021, Chems-eddine Hafiz was a member of the executive bureau of instance representing Muslims : French Council of the Muslim Faith (CFCM). He has been the vice-president from 2008 to 2021.

He is a member of the commission for legal reflection on the relations of Muslims with public powers, the day Machelon was appointed by Nicolas Sarkozy, Minister of State, and Minister of Interior.

He is a founding member of the Foundation for Works of Islam. He is also a member of the Conference of Religious Leaders in France (CRCF).

On January 11, 2020, he was elected president of the Society of Habous and Holy Places of Islam, of which he was vice-president since 2001. He became director of the Great Mosque of Paris, replacing Dalil Boubakeur who resigned from this post.

== Awards ==
- Officier de l'ordre national du Mérite. 2013
