= Pierre Ango =

French Catholic priest and scientist

Pierre Ango (20 April 1640 – 18 October 1694) was a French Catholic priest and scientist.

He was a professor at the College of La Flèche. In 1682, he published parts of Pardies' work on optics in his book Optique. In this work, Ango provided a construction for refraction which was not dissimilar that of Hooke.

== Works ==
- 1682 - L'Optique divisée en trois livres (Optics divided in three books)
