= Ignace-Gaston Pardies =

French Catholic Jesuit priest and scientist (1636–1673)

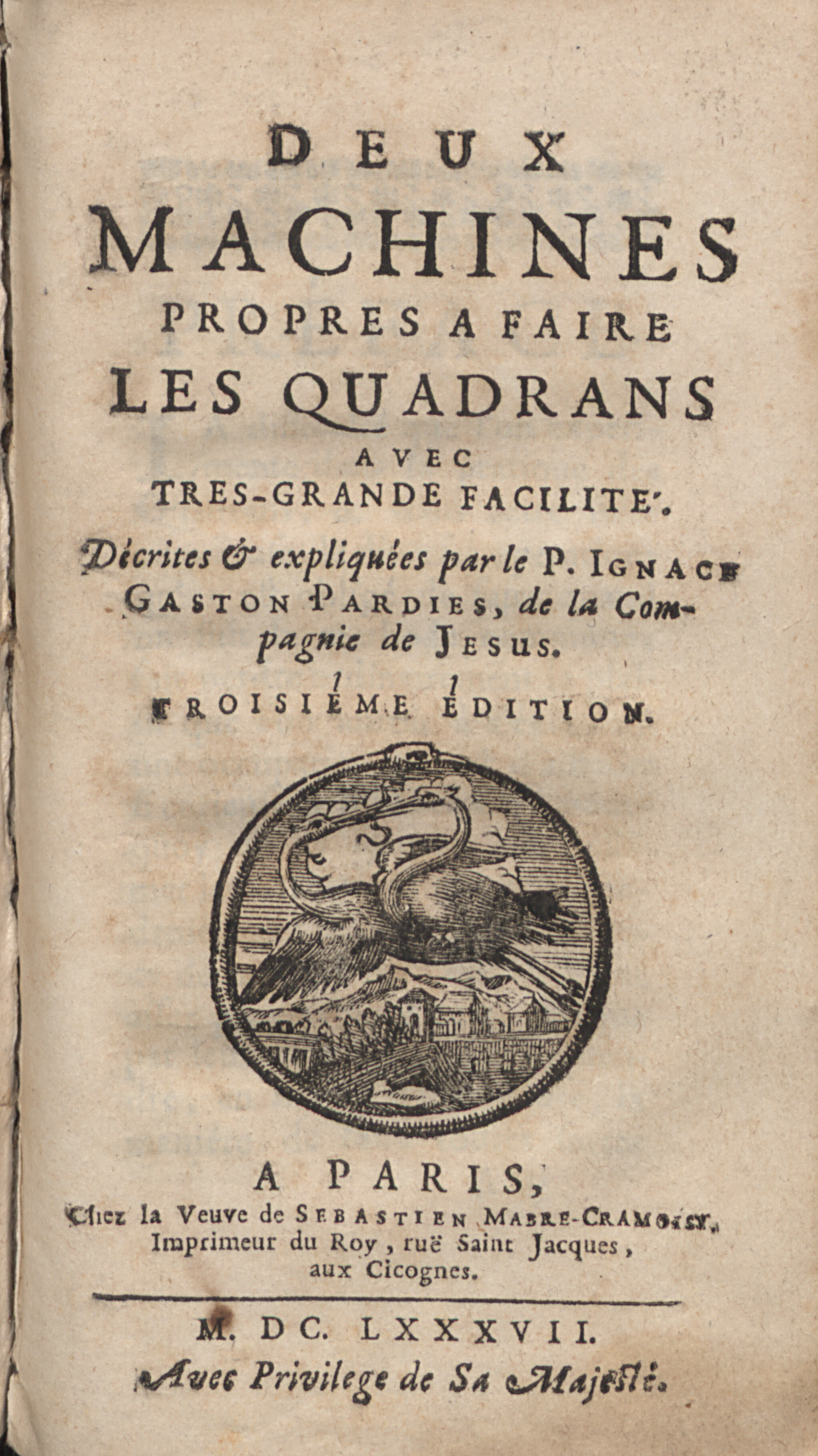
Deux machines propres à faire les quadrans, 1687

Ignace-Gaston Pardies (5 September 1636 – 21 April 1673) was a French Catholic Jesuit priest and scientist.

== Career ==
Pardies was born in Pau, France, the son of an advisor at the local assembly. He entered the Society of Jesus on 17 November 1652 and for a time taught classical literature; during this period he composed a number of short Latin works, in prose and verse. After his ordination, he taught philosophy and mathematics at the Collège de Clermont in Paris, which would eventually become the Lycée Louis-le-Grand. His earliest scientific work is the Horologium Thaumanticum Duplex (Paris, 1662), in which is described an instrument he had invented for constructing various kinds of sundials. Three years later appeared his Dissertatio de Motu et Natura Cometarum, published separately in Latin and in French (Bordeaux, 1665). His La Statique (Paris, 1673) argued that Galileo's theory was not exact. This, along with Discours du mouvement local (Paris, 1670), and the manuscript Traité complet d'Optique, in which he followed the undulatory theory of light (which identifies it as a harmonic vibration), form part of a general work on physics which he had planned. Traité complet d'Optique had been studied by Pierre Ango (1640–1694) a confrere of Pardies for his Book L`Optique which he published in 1682 after Pardies early death. The Manuscript has also been mentioned by Christiaan Huygens in his Treatise on Light. Huygens himself mentioned in 1668 that it has been Pardies' Theory that the speed of light is finite.

He initially opposed Isaac Newton's theory of refraction and his letters together with Newton's replies (which so satisfied Pardies that he withdrew his objections) are found in the Philosophical Transactions of the Royal Society for 1672 and 1673. A proponent of mechanism, his Discours de la Connaissance des Bestes (Paris, 1672) combated Descartes's views on animals, but did so very weakly, which led many to view it as a covert defence rather than a refutation, an impression which Pardies himself afterwards endeavoured to destroy. His Elémens de géométrie (Paris, 1671) was translated into Latin and English. He left in manuscript a work entitled Art de la Guerre and a celestial atlas comprising six charts, published after his death (Paris, 1673–74). His collected mathematical and physical works were published in French (The Hague, 1691) and in Latin (Amsterdam, 1694). He was a member of the academy of anatomist Pierre Michon Bourdelot.

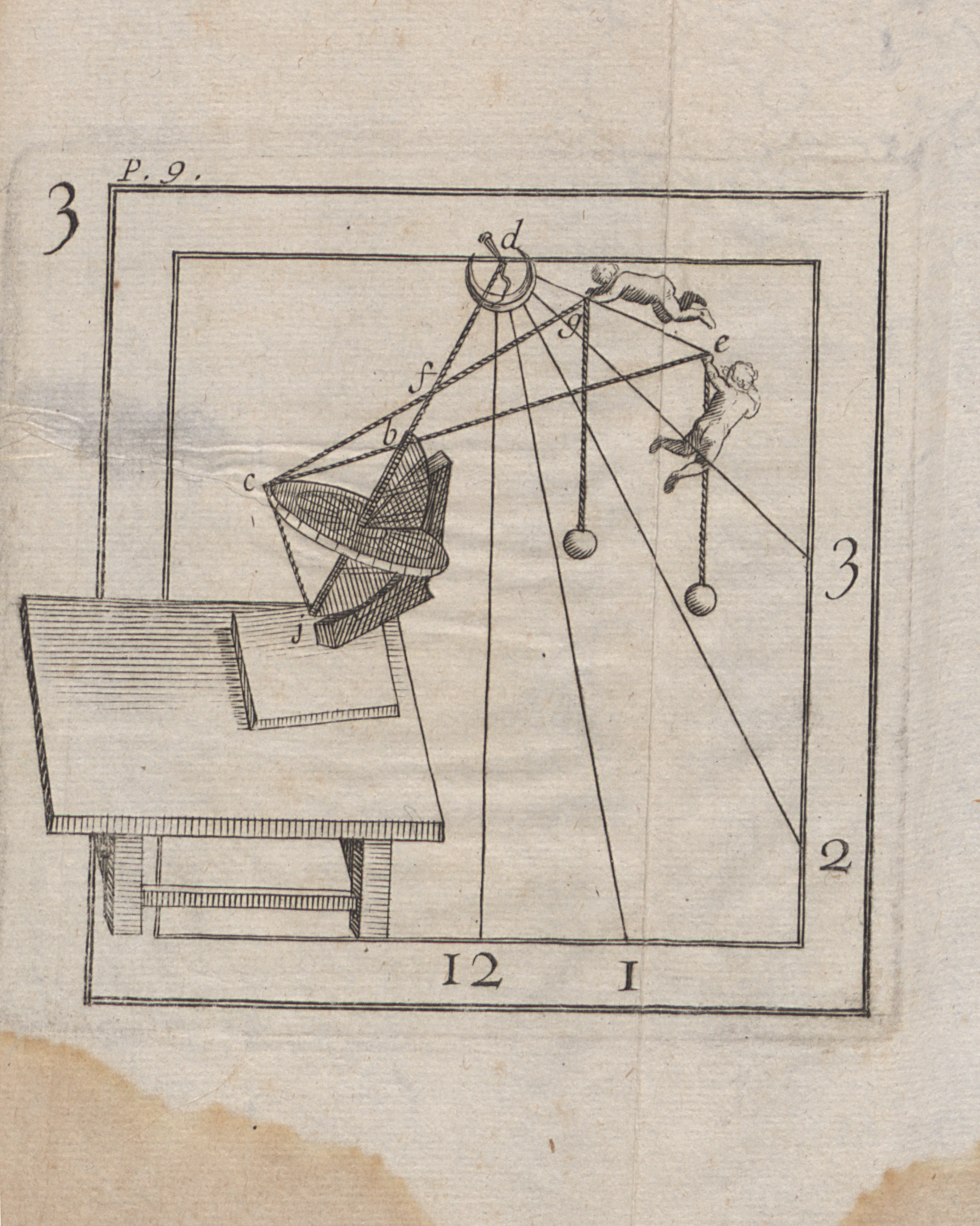
Deux machines propres à faire les quadrans (1687). Plate

In 1674, Pardies published the star atlas Globi coelestis in tabulas planas redacti descriptio in Paris. The atlas was partially based on the work of another French Jesuit scientist Thomas Gouye. The atlas was engraved by G. Vallet and dedicated to Johan Friedrich, Duke of Braunschweig-Luneburg. The constellation figures are drawn from Uranometria, but they were carefully reworked and adapted to a broader view of the sky. In 1693, a newer edition was published and in 1700 another edition appeared. They include new information, such as the paths of comets observed since 1674. The atlas uses gnomonic projection so that the plates make up a cube of the universe. The atlas served as a model for the star charts of William Rutter Dawes published in 1844. Pardies died of fever contracted whilst ministering to the prisoners of Bicêtre Hospital, near Paris.

In 1690, the Elémens was translated into Manchu for the Kangxi Emperor under the title Gi ho yuwan ben bithe.

== Works ==
- Elémens de géométrie (in French). Paris: Sébastien Mabre-Cramoisy. 1683.
- Deux machines propres à faire les quadrans (in French). Paris: Sébastien Mabre-Cramoisy. 1687.
- Statique (in French). Paris: Sébastien Mabre-Cramoisy. 1688.

== Images ==
Globi coelestis in tabulas planas redacti descriptio

Plate 1: northern circumpolar sky

Plate 2: equatorial region centred on right ascension 0^{h} (Pisces)

Plate 3: equatorial region centred on right ascension 6^{h} (Gemini)

Plate 4: equatorial region centred on right ascension 12^{h} (Virgo)

Plate 5: equatorial region centred on right ascension 18^{h} (Sagittarius)

Plate 6: southern circumpolar sky

== See also ==
- List of Roman Catholic scientist-clerics
