= Charles Porée =

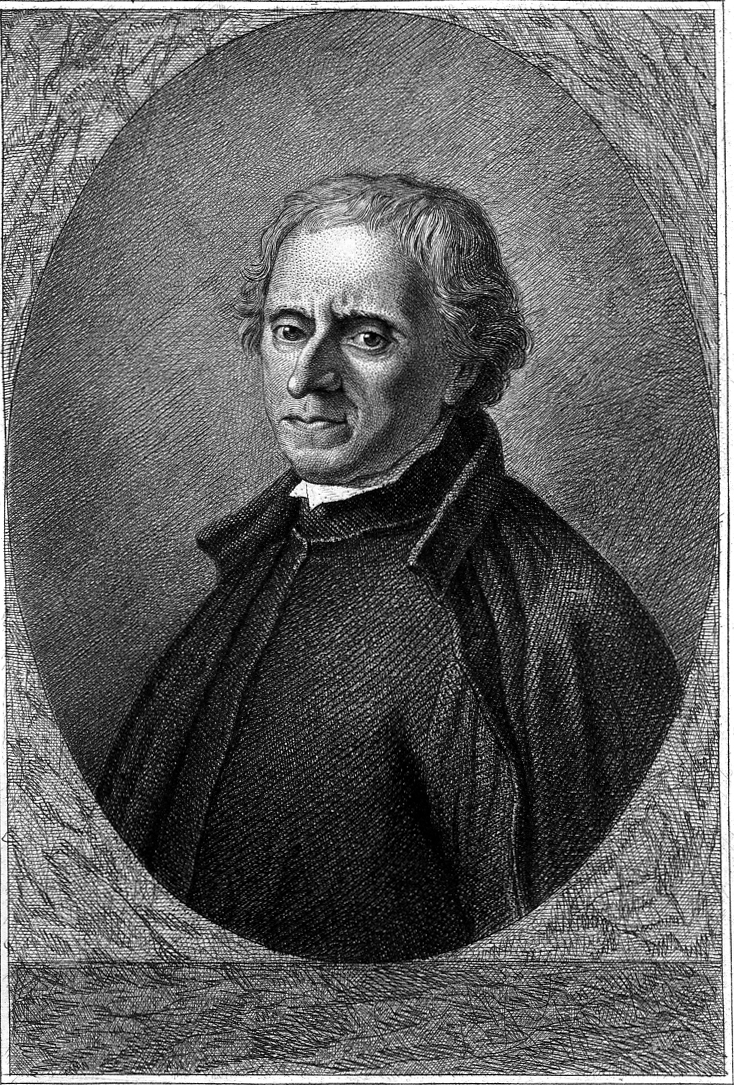
- Engraving of Charles Devrits
- Born: 4 September 1675; Vendes, France
- Died: 11 January 1741 (aged 65); Paris, France

Charles Porée (4 September 1675 – 11 January 1741) was a French priest, Jesuit, educator, orator, and poet.

He was the son of Thomas Porée and Madeleine Richer from la Ferté-Macé. His brother Charles-Gabriel Porée was also a writer.

== Selected works ==
- De Libris qui vulgo dicuntur romanenses, Discours prononcé le 25 février 1736 au collège Louis-le-Grand, Paris : Bordelet
- La Mandarinade, ou, Histoire comique du mandarinat de M. l’abbé de Saint-Martin, marquis de Miskou, À Siam [i.e. Caen]; & se trouve à Caen, Chez Manoury fils, l’aîné, 1769
- Caecus Amor ou L’Amour aveugle
- Agapitus martyr
- Mauritius imperator
- Regulus
- Brutus primus Romanorum consul
- Discours sur la satire
- De theatro, Discours sur les spectacles, 1733
- De criticis oratio
- L’Homme instruit par le spectacle, ou le Théâtre changé en école de vertu

=== Modern editions ===
- Théâtre jésuite néo-latin et Antiquité : sur le Brutus de Charles Porée (1708), éd. Édith Flamarion, Rome, École française de Rome, 2002, 530 p. ISBN 9782728306008
- Discours sur la satire, éd. Luís dos Santos, Paris, Éditions Honoré Champion, 2005. ISBN 9782745309938
- Discours sur les spectacles, éd. Édith Flamarion, Pierre Brumoy, Toulouse, Société de Littératures Classiques, 2000. ISBN 9782908728200

== Bibliography ==
- Joseph de La Servière, Un professeur d'Ancien Régime : Le père Charles Porée, S. J., 1676–1741, Oudin, 1899
- Georges Mancel, « Notice sur Charles Porée », Poètes normands, Éd. Louis-Henri Baratte, Paris, Amédée Bedelet, Martinon, Dutertre et Pilout, 1846
- M.Alleaume, Notice biographique & littéraire sur les deux Porée, page 87, in Académie nationale des sciences, arts et belles-lettres de Caen, 1852
