= Dalil Boubakeur =

French Algerian mufti (born 1940)

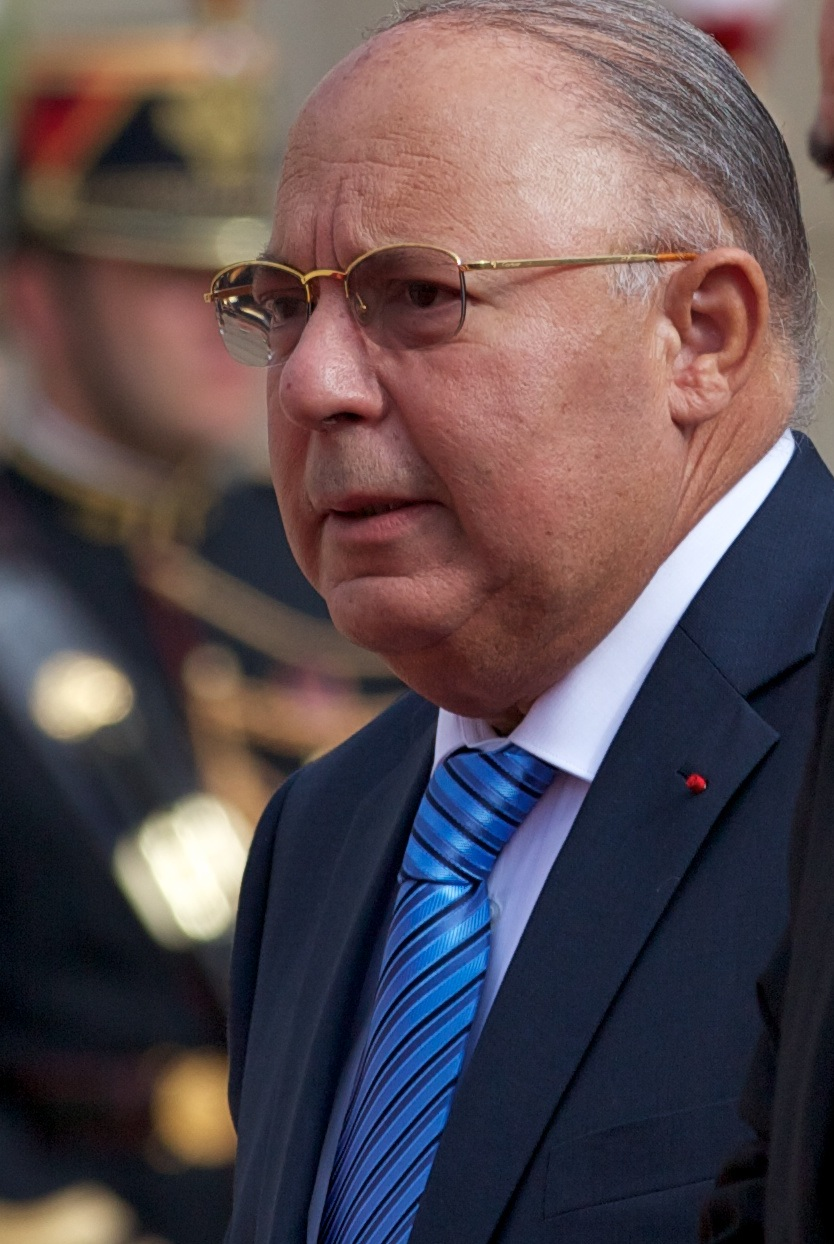
- Born: 2 November 1940 (age 85); Skikda, French Algeria
- Occupations: Mufti; President of the French Council of the Muslim Faith
- Honors: Officer of the Legion of Honour; Officer of the National Order of Merit

Dalil Boubakeur (born 2 November 1940) is a physician, mufti, and former rector of the Great Mosque of Paris. He is also the president of the French Council of the Muslim Faith. He was born on 2 November 1940 in the Algerian city of Skikda, to Hamza Boubakeur and Zoubida Kiouane. He studied at Lycée Bugeaud in Algiers, before moving to France and studying at Lycée Louis-le-Grand. He graduated from the Faculty of Sciences and Medicine of Paris and holds degrees in Quranic studies, theology and Muslim civilization. Boubakeur was succeeded in his role as rector of the Great Mosque of Paris by Chems-Eddine Hafiz in 2020.
