= Claude Buffier =

French philosopher, historian and teacher

Claude Buffier (25 May 1661 – 17 May 1737), French philosopher, historian and teacher, was born in Poland of French parents, who returned to France and settled in Rouen, then in the Province of Normandy, soon after his birth.

He was educated at the Jesuit college there, and he was received into the Order at the age of nineteen. A dispute with the archbishop compelled him to leave Rouen. After a short stay in Rome, he returned to Paris to the college of the Jesuits, where he spent the rest of his life. He seems to have been a good teacher and lucid expositor.

== Works ==
His goal in the Traité des premières vérités (Paris: 1724), his best-known work, was to discover the ultimate principle of knowledge. This he found in the sense we have of our own existence and of what we feel within ourselves. He thus took substantially the same ground as Descartes, but he rejected the a priori method. In order to know what exists distinct from the self, common sense is necessary. Common sense he defined as that disposition which nature has placed in all or most men, in order to enable them, when they have arrived at the age and use of reason, to form a common and uniform judgment with respect to objects different from the internal sentiment of their own perception, which judgment is not the consequence of any anterior judgment.

The truths which this disposition of nature obliges us to accept can be neither proved nor disproved; they are practically followed even by those who reject them speculatively. But Buffier did not claim for these truths of common sense the absolute certainty which characterizes the knowledge we have of our own existence or the logical deductions we make from our thoughts; they possess merely the highest probability, and the man who rejects them is to be considered a fool, though he is not guilty of a contradiction.

Buffier's aversion to scholastic refinements gives to his writings an appearance of shallowness and want of metaphysical insight, and unquestionably he failed entirely even to indicate the nature of that universality and necessity which he ascribed to his common verities; he was, however, one of the earliest to recognize the psychological as distinguished from the metaphysical side of Descartes's principle, and to use it, with no inconsiderable skill, as the basis of an analysis of the human mind, similar to that enjoined by Locke. In this he has anticipated Thomas Reid and the Scottish school. Voltaire described him as the only Jesuit who has given a reasonable system of philosophy.

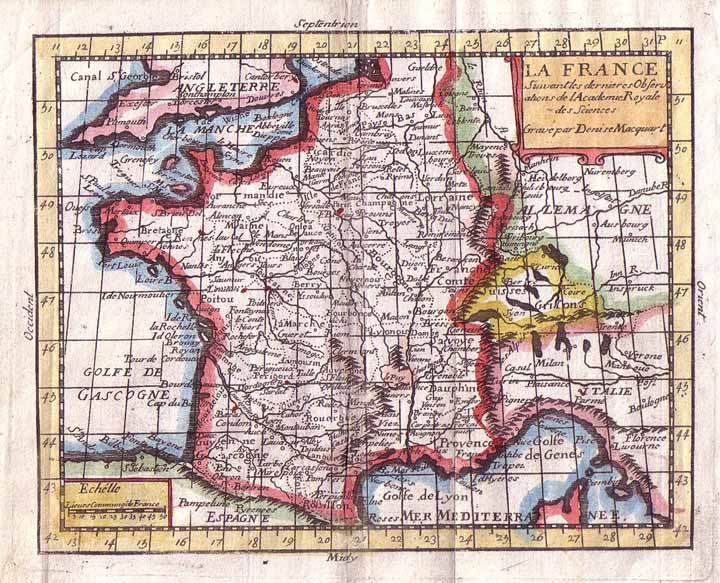
Claude Buffier, map of France.

He also wrote Elémens de métaphysique (1725), Suite de la Grammaire française sur un plan nouveau (1709) ["Sequel to A New Method of French Grammar"], and a number of historical essays. Most of his works appeared in a collected form in 1732, and an English translation of the Traité was published in 1780.
