= Jacques Lusseyran =

French author, resistance fighter

- Born: September 19, 1924; Paris, France
- Died: July 27, 1971 (aged 46); Saint-Géréon
- Occupations: Author, Political activist
- Notable work: And There Was Light

Jacques Lusseyran (19 September 1924 – 27 July 1971) was a French author and political activist. Blinded at the age of 7, at 17 Lusseyran became a leader in the French Resistance against Nazi Germany's occupation of France in 1941. He was eventually sent to Buchenwald concentration camp because of his involvement, and was one of 990 of his group of 2000 inmates to survive. He wrote about his life, including his experience during the war, in his autobiography And There Was Light.

== Life ==
Lusseyran was born in Paris, France. He became totally blind in a school accident at the age of 7. He soon learned to adapt to being blind and maintained many close friendships, particularly with one boy named Jean Besniée. At a young age he became alarmed at the rise of Adolf Hitler in Germany and decided to learn the German language so that he could listen to German radio broadcasts. By 1938, when Nazi Germany annexed Austria, he had accomplished this task.

Germany invaded France in 1940. In the spring of 1941, at the age of 17, Lusseyran formed a Resistance group called the Volunteers of Liberty with other students from the Lycée Louis-le-Grand and the Lycée Henri-IV. He was put in charge of recruitment. The group later merged with another Resistance group called Défense de la France. In July 1943 he participated in a campaign to drop pro-resistance leaflets on trains: forty squads of ten members each passed out seventy thousand leaflets. The squads carried tear gas pens to stop people from interfering, though these were never used, and there were no arrests.

On July 20, 1943, Lusseyran was arrested by the Gestapo, betrayed by a member of his resistance group named Elio. His knowledge of German helped him understand more of the situation than most French prisoners. He spent six months at Fresnes prison before being moved to Buchenwald concentration camp with 2000 other French citizens, where, because he was blind, he did not have to participate in forced labor as most other prisoners did. Soon most of his childhood friends and fellow resistance operatives were arrested, and he met some of them in the concentration camp. Lusseyran helped to motivate a spirit of resistance within the camp, particularly within the French and German prisoners.

In April 1945, he was liberated; 990 of his group of 2000 inmates survived. After the war, Lusseyran taught French literature in the United States and wrote books, including the autobiographical And There Was Light, which chronicles the first 20 years of his life. He died together with his third wife Marie in a car accident in France on July 27, 1971.

== Awards ==
- Prix Louis Barthou 1954 of the Académie Française
- Chevalier de la Légion d'honneur
- Médaille de la Résistance avec rosette

== Writings ==
- Against the Pollution of the I: Selected Writings of Jacques Lusseyran. New York, NY: Parabola Books, 1999. ISBN 0-930407-46-6.
- And There Was Light: Autobiography of Jacques Lusseyran, Blind Hero of the French Resistance. New York, NY: Parabola Books, 1998. ISBN 0-930407-40-7.
