= Louis-Henri Baratte =

Louis-Henri Baratte (né Louis-Henry Aglaé Baratte; 20 April 1805 – 7 June 1872) was a French medical doctor and writer born in Criquetot-l'Esneval, Normandy.

== Biography ==
A doctor of medicine, Baratte undertook to publish a collection of portraits of the famous Normans composed of at least 2,000 portraits engraved in copperplate. This collection, which was acquired in 1847 by the library of Rouen, received the collaboration of many other Norman men of letters, such as J.-F. Destigny from Caen, J. Mortent, Édouard Neveu, Georges Mancel, Alphonse Le Flaguais, J. Charma, Théodore-Éloi Lebreton. A. Delavigne, R. Deslandes and G. Lhéry, and also Pierre-François Tissot and Jules Janin. In 1840, he married Joséphine Eléonore Anne Constance De Garcias in Paris.

== Publications ==
- Poètes normands, Paris, Lacrampe, 1845.
- Essai de littérature médicale; choix des meilleurs morceaux en prose et en vers, extraits des auteurs les plus célèbres qui ont traité de la médecine et de son application, Paris, Baillière, 1846

== Sources ==
- Société havraise d’études diverses, Bio-bibliographie des écrivains de l'arrondissement du Havre, éd. Auguste Lechevalier, Le Havre, H. Micaux, 1903.
