= Nahe (wine region) =

Wine region in Germany

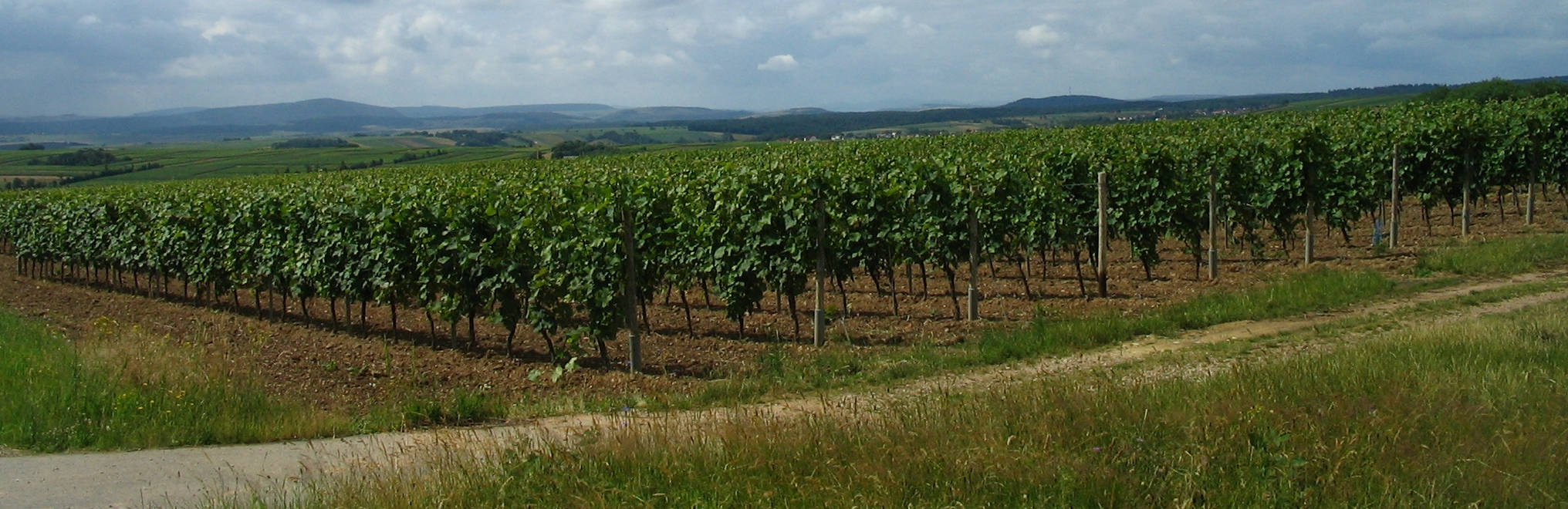
Vineyards in the Nahe region

Nahe (German pronunciation: [ˈnaːə]) is a region (Anbaugebiet) for quality wine in Germany, along the River Nahe in the state of Rhineland-Palatinate. On the region's 4,155 hectares (10,270 acres) of vineyards in 2008, white wine grapes dominate with 75% and Riesling is the most common variety with 27.2%. A characteristic of the Nahe region is that the soils are very varied owing to the region's volcanic origins.

Although the region was populated already in Roman times, and the village of Monzingen was mentioned as a wine village as early as 778, the Nahe wine region was defined only with the 1971 German wine law. Before that, the wines were sold as plain "Rhine wine". In recent decades, several Nahe producers have made a name for themselves with Riesling wines that have been rated very highly by international wine critics, and have come to be seen as being on par with the best wines of Moselle and Rheingau wines.

== History ==
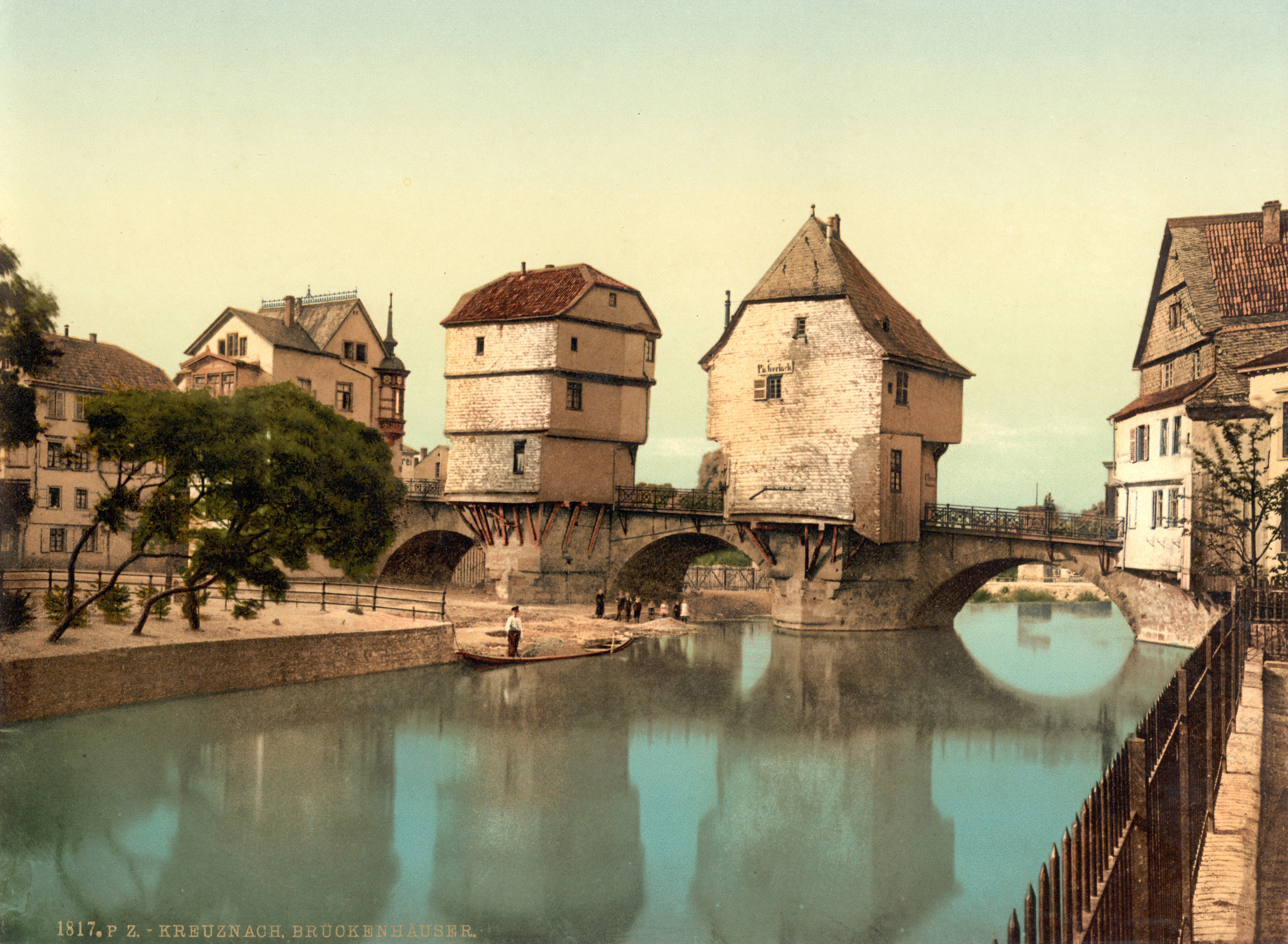
The Old Nahe Bridge in Bad Kreuznach, 1900

The Nahe was one of the last few German wine regions to develop significant plantings, being planted nearly six centuries after the Romans first cultivated the Mosel region. By the Middle Ages, viticulture was flourishing in the region under the care of Church-run vineyards. During the 19th century, the Nahe was considered one of Germany's finest wine regions and continued its prosperity till experiencing economic downturns following the world wars of the 20th century. While other German wine regions became more industrialized, the more rural Nahe fell behind and its presence on the world's wine market was dramatically reduced. Towards the end of the 20th century, reforms and renewed optimism among the Nahe winemakers would usher in a period of renaissance in the Nahe wine industry.

== Climate and geography ==
The Nahe wine region follows the path of the Nahe river in its northeasterly descent towards the Rhine. The river helps moderate the temperate climate of the region and the valleys of the Nahe's tributaries help foster diverse microclimates through the region. The Soonwald ranges to the northeast and rocky foothills to the east help retain heat and moderate the amount of rainfall that the region receives. Some south-facing vineyards have microclimates that are similar to a Mediterranean climate and are being experimented with for red wine grape cultivation. The Nahe flows parallel to the Moselle and lies 40 kilometers (25 mi) to the southeast of the Mosel wine region. The Mittelrhein and Rheingau wine regions lie to the north/northeast with the Rheinhessen forming the region's eastern border. Vineyards are located on steep slopes along the Nahe and its tributaries typically at elevations of 100–300 meters (330–980 ft).

== Subregions ==
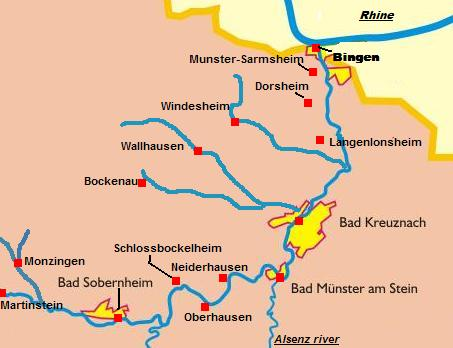
Nahe wine regions

The majority of the vineyards in the Nahe wine region are found along the banks of the Nahe from Martinstein, near the historic village of Monzingen and then downstream to its confluence with the Rhine at Bingen am Rhein. The region is broadly divided into three subregions, though there are quality wines that carry the "Nahe" designation that are produced outside of these. The main regions are the Upper Nahe, Bad Kreuznach and Lower Nahe. The wine-producing areas outside of these subregions includes the river Alsenz area that meets the Nahe at Bad Münster am Stein-Ebernburg and the villages of Bockenau, Roxheim, Sommerloch and Wallhausen several miles northwest of the Nahe.

The Nahe formally has only one overlapping district Bereich Nahetal that includes 7 Grosslagen (collective sites) and 328 Einzellagen (vineyards). The 7 Grosslagen are:

- Grosslage Burgweg-on the Upper Nahe, shares a name with Grosslagen in the Rheingau and Franconia. Most noted for its Riesling wine production.
- Grosslage Paradiesgarten-on the Upper Nahe, includes the historic village of Monzingen. Some producers here are noted for their Rieslings of cult wine status.
- Grosslage Kronenberg-in the Bad Kreuznach region, considered one of the best quality Grosslagen in the Nahe.
- Grosslage Pfarrgaten-northwest of Bad Kreuznach around the village of Wallhausen, one of the Nahe's smallest Grosslagen.
- Grosslage Rosengarten-northwest of Bad Kreuznach, shares a name with a Grosslage in the Rheingau; the region is widely planted with Müller-Thurgau and Silvaner.
- Grosslage Schlosskapelle-on the Lower Nahe, one of the Nahe's most promising Grosslagen for Pinot blanc and Pinot gris.
- Grosslage Sonnenborn-on the Lower Nahe and centered on the village of Langenlonsheim.

=== Upper Nahe ===
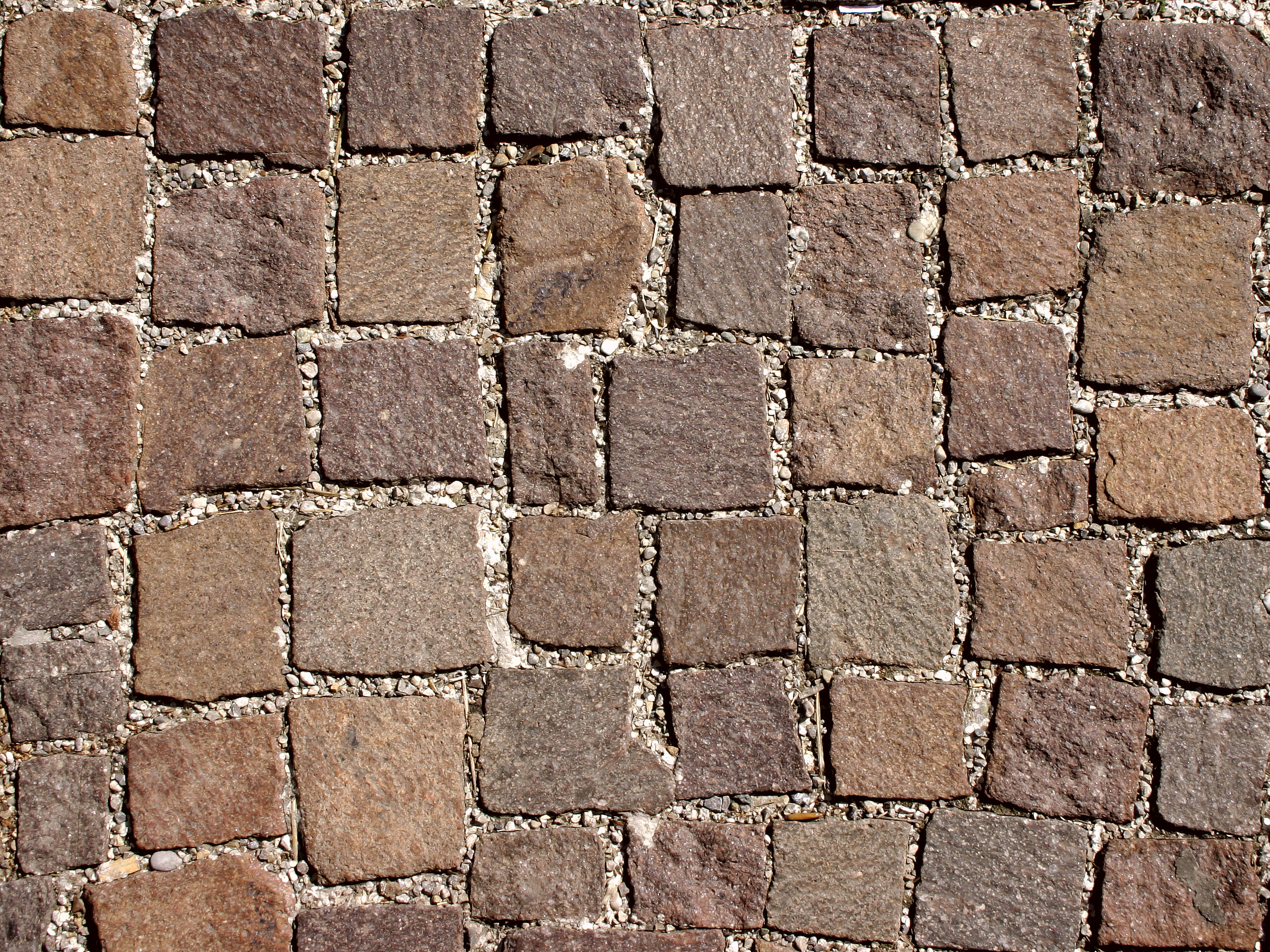
Porphyry cobblestones

The Upper Nahe region includes the westernmost and oldest vineyards on the Nahe. The region begins with the villages of Martinstein, Monzingen and follows the river to Bad Münster am Stein-Ebernburg where it meets the Alsenz. The area is noted for its vast diversity of vineyard soils, particularly in the area near Oberhausen where a single vineyard can include soils of sandstone, slate, melaphyre and porphyry. This region of the Nahe was modernized during the Flurbereinigung reforms of the late 20th century and is now characterized by steep, terraced vineyards along the banks of the Nahe planted mostly with Riesling. The climate of the region gets progressively warmer downstream with low amounts of annual rainfall that is favorable for the production of late harvest wines.

Wine villages of the Upper Nahe include-(moving downstream)

- Monzingen-including the Frühlingsplätzchen and Halenberg vineyards
- Meddersheim-including the Rheingrafenberg vineyard
- Schlossböckelheim-including the Felsenberg and Kupfergrube vineyards
- Oberhausen-including the Brücke vineyard
- Niederhausen-including the Hermannshöhle and Kerz vineyard. A 1901 classification of Nahe's vineyard carried out by the office of the Royal Prussian Surveyor listed the Hermannshöhle vineyard as the highest-ranking vineyard on the Nahe.
- Norheim-including the Dellchen and Kirschheck vineyards
- Traisen-including the Bastei and Rotenfels vineyards

=== Bad Kreuznach ===
The subregion of Bad Kreuznach includes the vineyards north of the town that are dominated with clay- and loess-based soils. The area has been traditionally led by large family-owned estates, such as those of the Anheuser family (of which the brewer Eberhard Anheuser was a part) and the Reichsgrafen von Plettenberg who are still producing wine today. These families were instrumental in the years after World War II in sustaining the reputation of Nahe wine but the Bad Kreuznach region, as a whole, has seen a steady decline since the end of the 20th century with very few vineyards participating in the Verband Deutscher Prädikatsweingüter (VDP) organization. The region still has some quality vineyards with the Kahlenberg and Krötenpfuhl being the most significant.

=== Lower Nahe ===
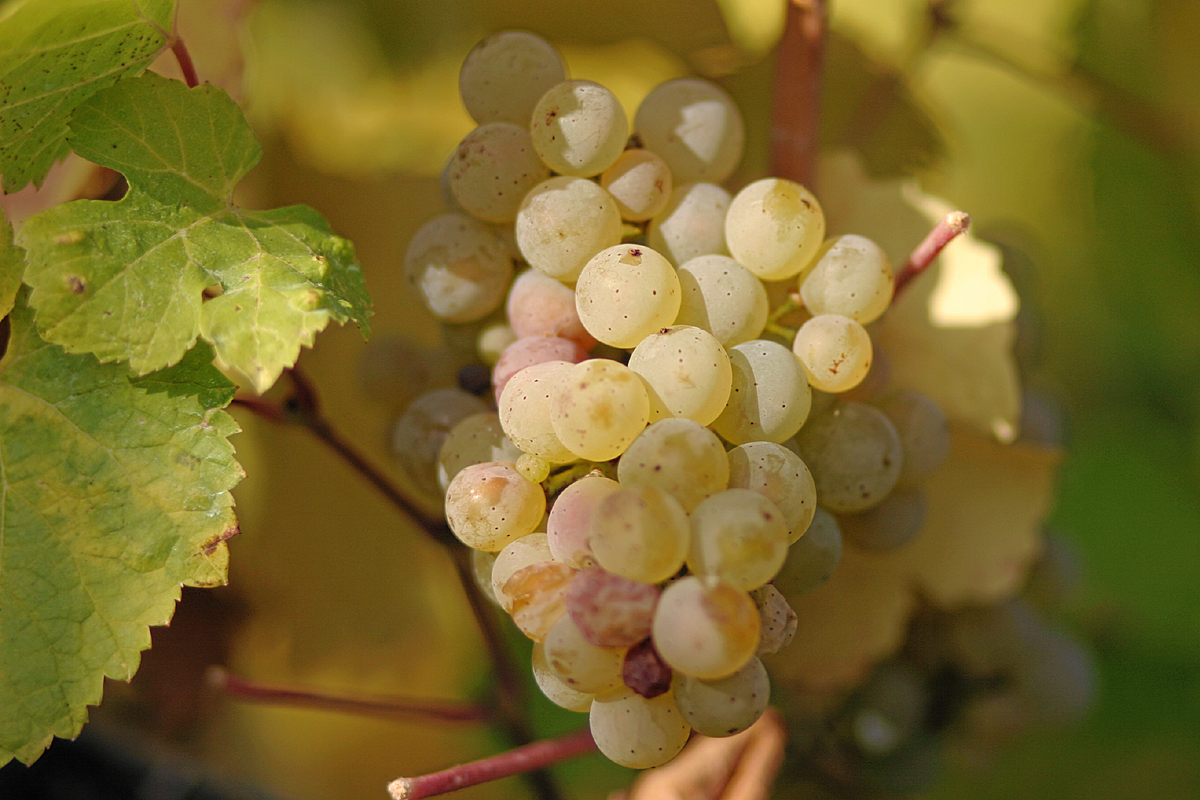
Riesling

The Lower Nahe subregion follows the Nahe past Bad Kreuznach north to the river's confluence with the Rhine at Bingen. Vineyards in the area tend to be quartzite and slate. In addition to Riesling, Scheurebe, Silvaner and Pinot blanc all have significant plantings in this area. The wines of the Lower Nahe tend to have more similarities to the wines of the Mittelrhein rather than the wines from other parts of the Nahe. This includes characteristic flavors of wet stones and minerals with citrus and stone fruit notes.

Wine villages of the Lower Nahe include-moving north

- Dorsheim-including the vineyards of Troll-Bach, Burgberg, Goldloch and Pittermännchen
- Münster-Sarmsheim-including the vineyards of Dautenflänzer and Pittersberg
- Laubenheim-including the vineyard of St. Remigiusberg
- Windesheim-including the vineyard of Rosenberg

== Grapes and wine ==
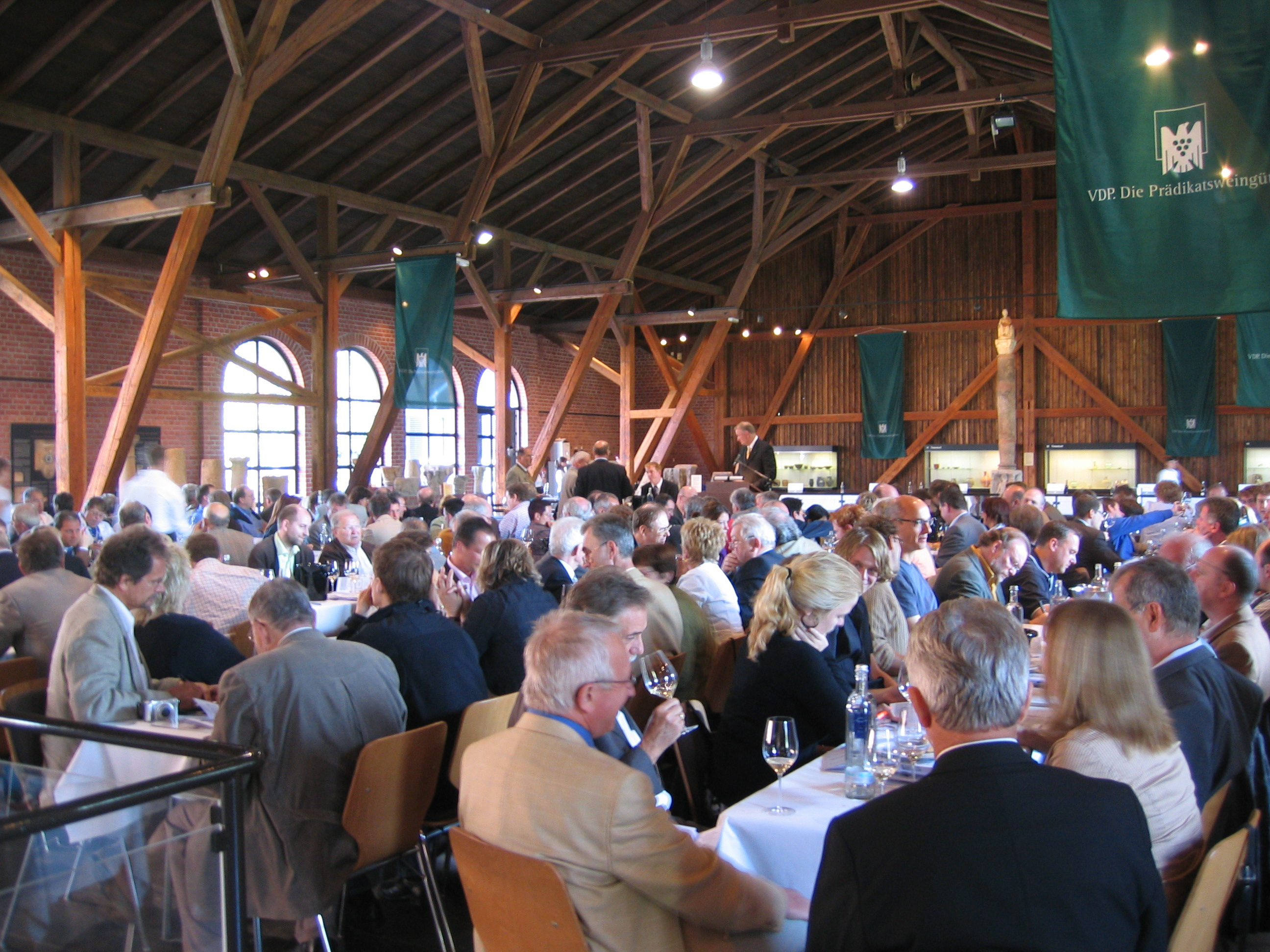
VDP auction of Nahe and Ahr wines at Bad Kreuznach

The Nahe is a predominantly white wine region with Riesling being the most significant planting. Riesling's prominence is due in part to the reforms of the Flurbereinigung and the decline of Müller-Thurgau which was once the Nahe's most widely planted variety but now accounts for around 16% of plantings. In the 1960s, Silvaner occupied more than half of all vineyards on the Nahe but fell in favor to plantings of Müller-Thurgau and Riesling such that it now accounts for a little less than 10%. Plantings of Pinot blanc, Pinot gris and the red Pinot noir have been increasing. Overall, red grape varieties account for around 23% of the Nahe's vineyards with Dornfelder, Blauer Portugieser and Pinot noir being the most popular plantings. Other varieties found in the Nahe include Bacchus, Faberrebe and Kerner.

For a large part of the Nahe's history, grapes from the region were blended with other German wine grapes and labeled as "Rhine wine". Today the majority of Nahe wine is consumed domestically with the nine member estates of the VDP having the largest export market of the region. Unlike other German wine regions, co-operatives have a smaller presence that pales in comparison to the influences of the large German supermarket chains that form a large sector of the Nahe wine market.

The most cultivated grape varieties, by area in 2008, were:

- Riesling, 1,125 ha (27.1%)
- Müller-Thurgau, 552 ha (13.3%)
- Dornfelder, 456 ha (11.0%)
- Silvaner, 277 ha (6.7%)
- Pinot noir, 248 ha (6.0%)
- Pinot blanc, 224 ha (5.4%)
- Pinot gris, 214 ha (5.2%)
- Kerner, 194 ha (4.7%)
- Bacchus, 153 ha (3.7%)
- Scheurebe, 131 ha (3.2%)
- Blauer Portugieser, 112 ha (2.7%)
- Regent, 101 ha (2.4%)
- Chardonnay, 39 ha (0.9%)
- Faberrebe, 30 ha (0.7%)
- Gewürztraminer, 25 ha (0.6%)
- Dunkelfelder, 23 ha (0.6%)
- Huxelrebe, 20 ha (0.5%)
