= Anheuser family =

German-American wine-making family

The Anheuser family is a family from the Nahe in the Rhineland-Palatinate. The American brewery family of Anheuser-Busch fame are descendants of Eberhard Anheuser who was born in Bad Kreuznach. The Anheuser family has been producing German wine in the Nahe since the 17th century and has continued producing wine for 13 generations under the name of Weingut Paul Anheuser.

== History ==
The earliest record of winemaking by the Anheusers dates to 1627 with an Anheuser operating a winery in Bad Kreuznach. In 1842, Eberhard Anheuser immigrated to St. Louis, Missouri while his nephew Rudolf Anheuser began purchasing more vineyards in the Nahe valley around the towns of Altenbamberg, Monzingen, Niederhausen, Norheim, Schloßböckelheim and Roxheim. In 1861, Eberhard Anheuser saw the marriage of both of his daughters to the sons of a German wine merchant from Mainz. He opened a brewery with one of his sons-in-law, Adolphus Busch.
