= Pierre Brumoy =

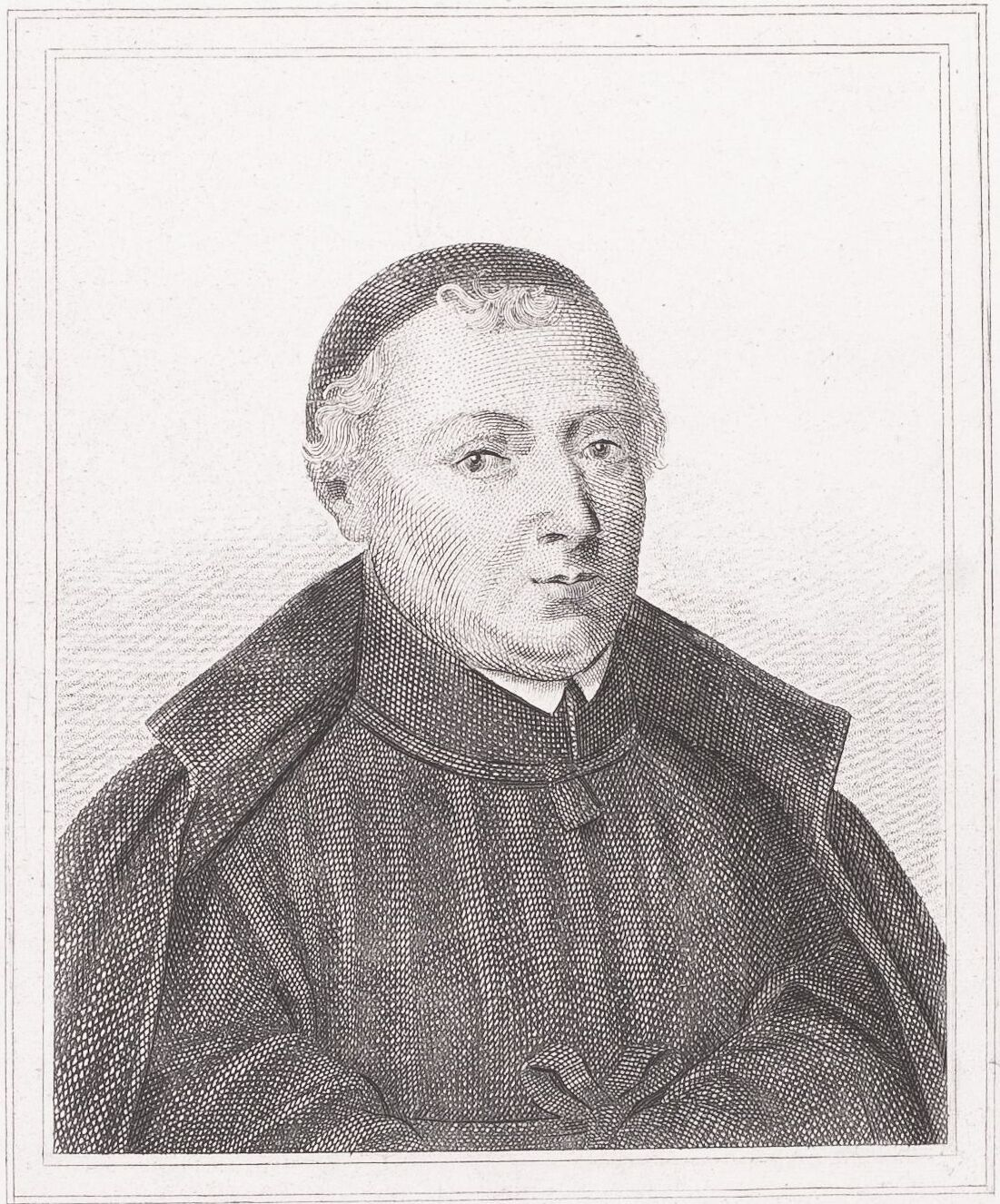
Pierre Brumoy

Pierre Brumoy (26 August 1688, in Rouen – 16 April 1742, in Paris) was an 18th-century French Jesuit, humanist and editor of the Journal de Trévoux.

Father Brumoy professed in colleges of his order. He provided articles to the Journal of Trevoux, published vol. XI of L'Histoire de l’église gallicane begun by Jacques Longueval and Pierre-Claude Fontenai that he had been instructed to continue.

The book that made his reputation, Théâtre des Grecs, contains translations of seven plays, other analysis, and begins with three discourses: Sur le théâtre grec; Sur l’origine de la tragédie; Sur le parallèle du théâtre ancien et du moderne. Despite translation infidelities and narrow views, this book gave the service to inform the public of authors who were only accessible to scholars and was republished.

From Brumoy we also have a Recueil de diverses pièces en prose et en vers; Œuvres diverses, (Paris, 1741, 4 vol. in-12°), containing discourses, three tragedies, two comedies in verse, played in colleges, and two esteemed Latin poems, one on Passions, the other on la Verrerie. He also participated to the Résolutions d’Espagne by father d’Orléans and to the Histoire de Rienzi by father Du Cerceau.

== Publications ==
- 1725: La Vie de l'Impératrice Éléonore. Paris : J. B. de Maudouis;
- 1730: Le Théâtre des Grecs, work containing translations and analysis of Greek tragedies, with remarks, 3 vol. in-4°, and 1747, 6 vol. in-8°; reprinted with corrections and additions, by MM. Guillaume Dubois de Rochefort and Gabriel de La Porte du Theil, Pierre Prévost and André-Charles Brottier, 1785–1789, 13 vol. in-8° and by Raoul Rochette, 1820–1825, vol. in-8°;
- 1743: La Boîte de Pandore, ou la Curiosité punie, comedy in 3 acts, The Hague, J. Neaulme, in-12°;
- 1743: Le Couronnement du jeune David, pastorale en 4 actes, The Hague, J. Neaulme, in-12°;
- 1743: Isac, tragedy in 5 acts, The Hague, J. Neaulme, in-12°.

== Sources ==
- Gustave Vapereau, Dictionnaire universel des littératures, Paris, Hachette, 1876, (p. 331).
