= Hüffelsheim =

- Municipality
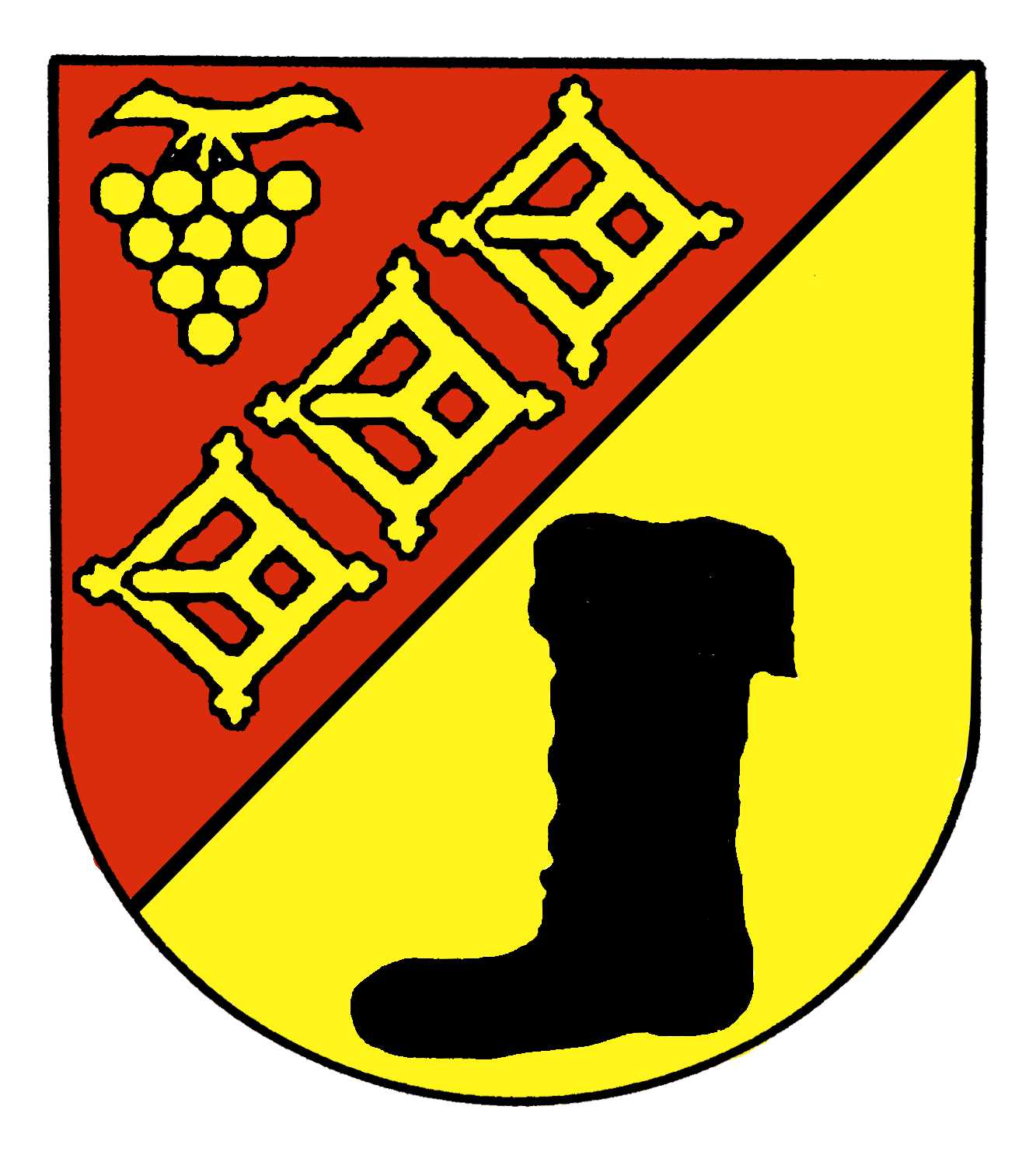
- Coat of arms

- Location of Hüffelsheim within Bad Kreuznach district
- Interactive map of Hüffelsheim
- Location within Germany Location within Rhineland-Palatinate
- Coordinates: 49°49′21″N 7°47′55″E
- Country: Germany
- State: Rhineland-Palatinate
- District: Bad Kreuznach
- Municipal assoc.: Rüdesheim

Government
  - Mayor (2019–24): Jochen Fiscus (SPD)

Area
  - Total: 6.55 km^{2} (2.53 sq mi)
- Elevation: 200 m (660 ft)

Population (2025-12-31)
  - Total: 1,281
  - Density: 196/km^{2} (507/sq mi)
- Time zone: UTC+01:00 (CET)
  - Summer (DST): UTC+02:00 (CEST)
- Postal codes: 55595
- Dialling codes: 0671
- Vehicle registration: KH
- Website: www.og-hueffelsheim.de

Hüffelsheim is an Ortsgemeinde – a municipality belonging to a Verbandsgemeinde, a kind of collective municipality – in the Bad Kreuznach district in Rhineland-Palatinate, Germany. It belongs to the Verbandsgemeinde of Rüdesheim, whose seat is in the municipality of Rüdesheim an der Nahe.

== Geography ==
=== Location ===
Hüffelsheim lies on a high plateau at an elevation of roughly 220 meters ("m") above sea level above the River Nahe at the Naturpark Soonwald-Nahe. Bad Kreuznach, the district seat, lies only a few kilometers away to the east-northeast. The municipal area measures 657 hectares ("ha"), of which 30ha is wooded and 20ha is planted with vineyards.

=== Neighbouring municipalities ===
Clockwise from the north, Hüffelsheim's neighbours are the municipality of Rüdesheim an der Nahe, the town of Bad Kreuznach and the municipalities of Traisen, Norheim, Niederhausen, Schloßböckelheim and Weinsheim, all of which likewise lie within the Bad Kreuznach district.

=== Constituent communities ===
Also belonging to Hüffelsheim are the outlying homesteads of Antoniushof, Marienhof and Wiesenhof.

== History ==
Hüffelsheim is believed to have grown out of a Roman country estate, which after the Frankish conquest under King Clovis about AD 500 would have been taken into ownership by the Frankish nobleman Hufileib (or Hufflilin) and, over time, expanded. About 766, the village had its first documentary mention. As long ago as 800, the first Christian church arose on noble property, which was consecrated to Saint Lambert of Maastricht. The counts of the Nahegau exercised sovereignty over the village. In the 10th century, it was the Archbishopric of Magdeburg that held both the land and the tithes, and later on it was Mainz. About 1200, the village belonged as an Imperial fief to the Rhinegrave of Stein, although he in turn enfeoffed various knightly families with his own landhold. Among these families were the Hundesrucke, the Lords of Sien and the Family von Sickingen-Ebernburg. The Hüffelsheim village lordship was also further granted in fief by the Waldgraves of Kyrburg and Dhaun to other fiefholders, such as Hermann von der Porten and the knights Boos von Waldeck (about 1359). According to legend, a knight Boos supposedly acquired the village of Hüffelsheim by drinking from a boot. Hüffelsheim's current coat of arms acknowledges this legend in one of its charges. On into the 18th century, the Families Boos von Waldeck and Sickingen exercised their rights in Hüffelsheim that had come down to them from the Middle Ages. The village church was converted and enlarged in Gothic times. About 1542, the Hüffelsheim town hall came into being, later acquiring a bakehouse addition in 1575. Next to this lay the lordly estate with the tithe barn. Arising here later was a Boos von Waldeck Amt winery. During the Thirty Years' War, the village was empty of people for some years. Begun thereafter was an ongoing development of community life that has persisted down to the present day. After the Peace of Augsburg, the Reformation was also introduced into Hüffelsheim (about 1557). A village school was established about 1660. The years after the Thirty Years' War, however, also brought hardship with French troops who showed up in the course of King Louis XIV's wars of conquest. The old village church was given a makeover about 1706-1708 as a Baroque hall church and for more than 180 years thereafter, it was shared with the then recently arrived Catholic inhabitants, until the Catholics built their own church in 1886. In the mid 18th century, the Sickingen landholds were sold to the Princes of Bretzenheim. When the French Revolutionary troops came about 1796, however, the time of nobles and lords, even the Barons Boos von Waldeck, came to an end. For two decades, Hüffelsheim, along with the rest of the German lands on the Rhine’s left bank, belonged to France (first the French First Republic), and then eventually Napoleonic France. After Napoleon’s defeat in the German campaign, the last and decisive phase of the War of the Sixth Coalition and indeed of the Napoleonic Wars, the Congress of Vienna grouped Hüffelsheim into the Kingdom of Prussia in 1815. The village remained in Prussia until the end of the Second World War. On 13 August 1913, Prussian King and Emperor of Germany Wilhelm II visited Hüffelsheim. Since 1949, the village has belonged to the then newly founded state of Rhineland-Palatinate.

=== The bell from Powunden ===
In the Second World War, the great bell from the Hüffelsheim church was seized by the authorities and met a more than usually unkind fate. It never did get melted down for wartime use. Instead, it was destroyed in a bombing at the storage yard – these places were called “bell graveyards” – in Hamburg. So, the Evangelical church community asked the bell office at the Evangelical Church in the Rhineland for a replacement. Instead, they were given a loaner in 1952. It was one of the two bells from the church at Powunden near Königsberg in East Prussia, although even by this time, as a result of shifts in borders in the wake of the war, this place was already known as Khrabrovo (and the nearby city as Kaliningrad). The formerly East Prussian bell still calls worshippers in Hüffelsheim to services even today. See also Town partnerships below.

=== Population development ===
Hüffelsheim's population development since Napoleonic times is shown in the table below. The figures for the years from 1871 to 1987 are drawn from census data:

Year	Inhabitants
1815	560
1835	726
1871	674
1905	701
1939	711

Year	Inhabitants
1950	748
1961	789
1970	966
1987	1,070
2005	1,318

== Religion ==
Hüffelsheim has two churches, one Protestant and one Catholic. As at 30 September 2013, there are 1,328 full-time residents in Hüffelsheim, and of those, 673 are Evangelical (50.678%), 412 are Catholic (31.024%), 24 (1.807%) belong to other religious groups and 219 (16.491%) either have no religion or will not reveal their religious affiliation.

== Politics ==
=== Municipal council ===
The council is made up of 16 council members, who were elected by proportional representation at the municipal election held on 7 June 2009, and the honorary mayor as chairman. The municipal election held on 7 June 2009 yielded the following results:

Year	SPD	CDU	FWG	Total
2009	11	4	1	16 seats
2004	11	4	1	16 seats

=== Mayor ===
Hüffelsheim's mayor is Jochen Fiscus, and his deputies are Uwe Weidmann and Ernst-Walter Thomas.

=== Coat of arms ===
The municipality's arms might be described thus: Per bend sinister gules in dexter chief a bunch of grapes below which three arming buckles flory in bend sinister, all Or and Or a boot sable.

In 1980, Hüffelsheim gave itself a new coat of arms. Hüffelsheim had had no arms of its own until that time. All that was known before these arms was an old court seal with Saint Lambert's image. In Prussian times, the Prussian Eagle graced the seal and the municipal stamps. The charges borne in the arms refer to Hüffelsheim's only local legend, the one that tells of the drink from the boot. The bunch of grapes also stands for the wine made in Hüffelsheim. The three buckles stand for the Family Boos von Waldeck, one of whose members figures in the legend. The boot, according to legend, was the drinking vessel used by a knight Boos to partake of wine – a fair amount, given that the legend says that he drank a whole bootful – and he thereby earned the right to acquire Hüffelsheim for himself and his family.

=== Town partnerships ===
Hüffelsheim fosters partnerships with the following places:

- Khrabrovo, Kaliningrad Oblast, Russia since 1985

Hüffelsheim's partner community lies in what was once East Prussia. Before the Potsdam Agreement went into effect, it was Powunden in the Königsberg district (or from 1939 to 1945, the Samland district), before as a result of the said agreement it found itself in the Soviet Union. See also The bell from Powunden above.

== Culture and sightseeing ==
=== Buildings ===
The following are listed buildings or sites in Rhineland-Palatinate’s Directory of Cultural Monuments:

- Evangelical parish church, Weinsheimer Straße – formerly Saint Lambert’s, west tower and nave walls Late Gothic, conversions in 1611 and 1706; old graveyard wall; warriors’ memorial 1914-1918, sandstone pillar with relief, 1920s; three pastors’ gravestones, 19th century
- katholische Kirche, Beinde 10 – Gründerzeit brick building, marked 1887, Master Builder Johann Pfeiffer
- Brunnenstraße – well, 18th or 19th century
- Brunnenstraße – wayside chapel, 19th century
- Near Fröschengasse 8 – Renaissance wellhouse/well, marked 1595
- Fröschengasse 8 – timber-frame house, partly solid, about 1600
- Fröschengasse 13 – house, about 1600
- Hauptstraße 7 – Baroque timber-frame house, 18th century
- Near Hauptstraße 8 – well, possibly from the latter half of the 18th or earlier half of the 19th century
- Hauptstraße 13 – town hall; timber-frame building with gateway, 1582–1595, stairway tower marked 1595, former bakehouse, 1608
- Hauptstraße 14 – Baroque timber-frame house, partly solid, 18th century, essentially possibly older
- Hauptstraße 16 – Baroque timber-frame house, partly solid, 18th century
- Hauptstraße 18 – building with half-hip roof, about 1800
- Hauptstraße 44 – Baroque timber-frame house of an estate complex, partly solid, possibly from the 17th century, gateway arch with pedestrian gate, marked 1717
- Kirchenstraße 2 – building with half-hip roof, about 1800
- Jewish graveyard, in the southwest at the edge of the “Heisterberg” forest (monumental zone) – opened in the early 19th century, gravestones up to 1928 (see also below)

=== More about the Jewish graveyard ===
The Jewish graveyard in Hüffelsheim was laid out about 1820. It was also the burying ground for Jewish inhabitants of Norheim. Its area is 2 014 m^{2}. Still preserved there are 30 graves with gravestones, although many of these stones are unreadable. The oldest datable stone is from 1837 (Breinele, daughter of Jizchak from Altenbamberg), while the newest is from 1928 (Selma Strauss née Grünewald, died on 23 October 1928). Without knowing the local environs or the country paths in depth, the graveyard is very hard to find. The way to the graveyard leads from Hüffelsheim some 2 km towards Niederhausen, then to the right at the edge of the woods and another kilometre up the mountainside. As seen from the entrance, the graveyard abuts the municipal limit with Niederhausen to the right. Alternatively, visitors can park at the Wiesenhof (between Hüffelsheim and Schloßböckelheim) and walk south to the edge of the woods, then keep right in the woods for the 300 m or so up to the graveyard. However one goes there, though, one is greeted by a sign on the gate (which itself is hard to spot from the path through all the bushes), which says Betreten verboten – Schlüssel beim Bürgermeister (“entry forbidden – key with the mayor”).

=== Clubs ===
Hüffelsheim distinguishes itself with its very active club life, as well as its harmonious sense of community. The following clubs are active in Hüffelsheim:

- CDU-Ortsverband Hüffelsheim — Christian Democratic Union of Germany local chapter
- Fastnachtsverein “Die Kuckuckseier” e.V. — Shrovetide Carnival (Fastnacht) club
- Förderverein “Freunde der Feuerwehr” — volunteer fire brigade promotional association
- Freiwillige Feuerwehr Hüffelsheim — volunteer fire brigade
- FWG Hüffelsheim e.V. — Free Voters local chapter
- Jugend- und Turnverein Hüffelsheim — youth and gymnastic club
- Männergesangverein Hüffelsheim — men's singing club
- Musikverein Hüffelsheim — music club
- SPD-Ortsverein Hüffelsheim — Social Democratic Party of Germany local chapter
- Sportgemeinde Hüffelsheim — sporting union
- Square Dance Club “Red-Rock-Hoppers”
- Sterbekasse Hüffelsheim 1881 — insurance club that pays for funerals
- Verein der Freunde und Förderer der SG 1946 Hüffelshein e.V. — sporting union promotional association
- Verkehrs- und Verschönerungsverein — transport and beautification club
- Volksbildungswerk Hüffelsheim — “people’s education”

=== Regular events ===
Hüffelsheim's sense of community also shows itself in the great number of festivals staged by clubs and the wealth of cultural events on offer. There is, for example, each year on the weekend of the last Sunday in July, a traditional kermis (church consecration festival), put on by various clubs. Since 2005, this has been enriched with the addition of a parade. Every other year in late August, the Ortsgemeinde administration stages a village community festival around the historic town hall, with a great village market. Other cultural events may include, among other things, theatrical productions, concerts and Carnival events. Other regular events include the following:

- SPD/CDU New Year's levée, second Sunday in January
- May Day celebration, 30 April, staged by the volunteer fire brigade
- Summer Festival, second weekend in June, staged by the youth and gymnastic club and the men's singing club
- Adventsblasen rund ums Rathaus, fourth day of Advent

== Economy and infrastructure ==
=== Economic structure ===
Today roughly 1,400 people make their homes in Hüffelsheim. The village has the infrastructure that one would usually associate with such a small place. Basic needs are supplied by resident shops such as bakeries, inns and a drink market. There is a kindergarten for young children, and local public transport links may be described as good.

=== Transport ===
Running through Hüffelsheim is Landesstraße 108, off which, right in the village centre, branches Kreisstraße 53, which leads a short way to Bundesstraße 41, which passes by the village just to the north. Serving nearby Norheim is a railway station on the Nahe Valley Railway (Bingen–Saarbrücken).

=== Education ===
Hüffelsheim's kindergarten is made up of three groups, each with 25 children. There are eight kindergarten teachers on staff. All together, 75 places are available for children aged from 2 to 6. Thirty-four of those places are all-day places.

== Famous people ==
=== Famous people associated with the municipality ===
- Norbert Becker (b. 1949 in Hüffelsheim), Biologist at the Heidelberg University and President of the World Mosquito Control Association
