= Tannay, Nièvre =

Tannay
- Commune
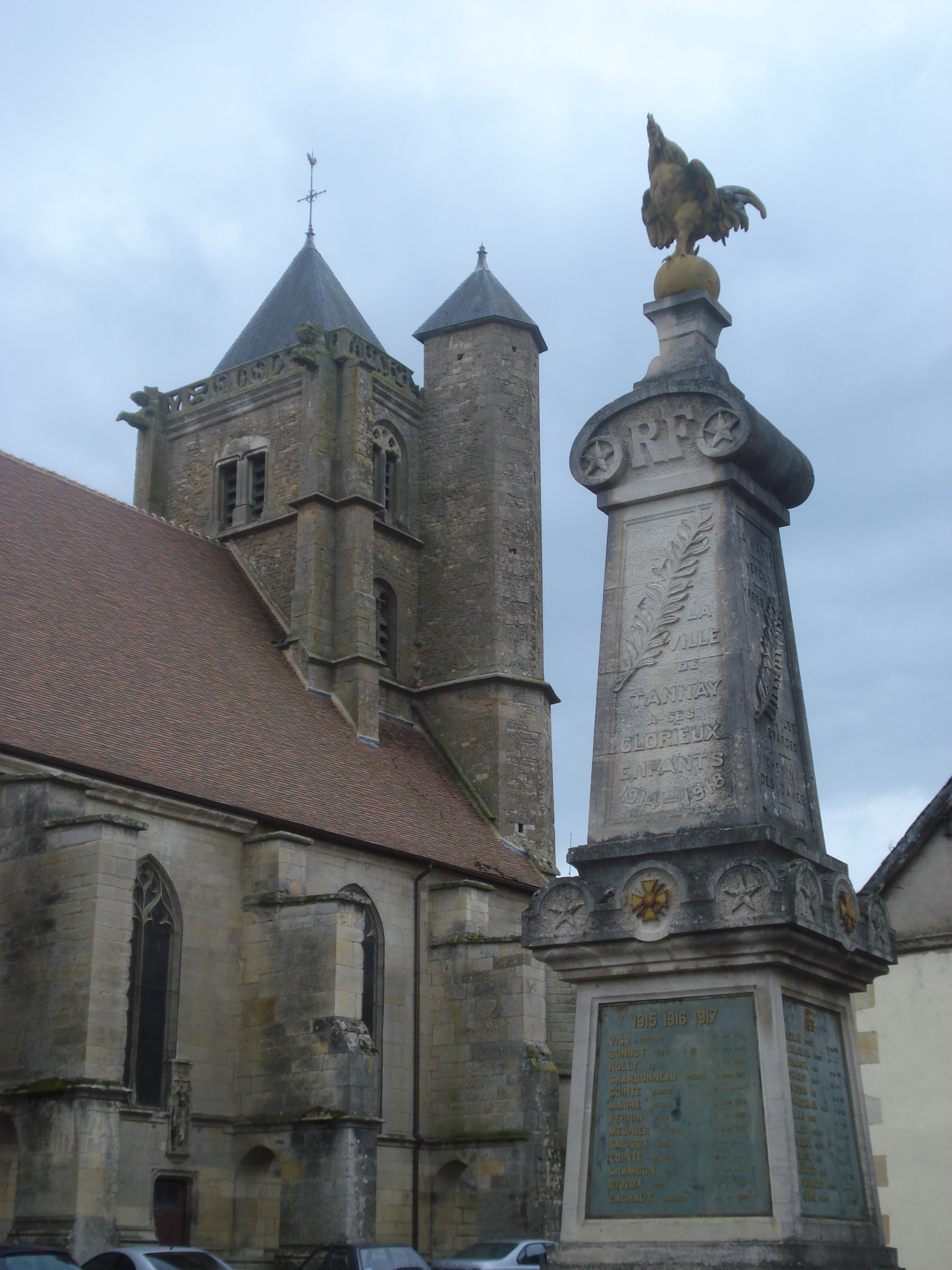
- The church in Tannay

- Coat of arms
- Location of Tannay
- Location within France Location within Bourgogne-Franche-Comté
- Coordinates: 47°22′07″N 3°35′33″E
- Country: France
- Region: Bourgogne-Franche-Comté
- Department: Nièvre
- Arrondissement: Clamecy
- Canton: Clamecy
- Intercommunality: Tannay-Brinon-Corbigny

Government
  - Mayor (2020–2026): Philippe Nolot
- Area^{1}: 15.36 km^{2} (5.93 sq mi)
- Highest elevation: 366 m (1,201 ft)
- Lowest elevation: 161 m (528 ft)
- Population (2023): 530
  - Density: 35/km^{2} (89/sq mi)
- Time zone: UTC+01:00 (CET)
  - Summer (DST): UTC+02:00 (CEST)
- INSEE/Postal code: 58286 /58190
- ^{1} French Land Register data, which excludes lakes, ponds, glaciers > 1 km^{2} (0.386 sq mi or 247 acres) and river estuaries.

Tannay (French pronunciation: [tanɛ]) is a commune in the Nièvre department in central France, region of Bourgogne-Franche-Comté.

== Geography ==
The village is built on a hill, providing a significant point of view over the Yonne valley. The Canal du Nivernais (Nièvre lock) is navigable.

== Points of interest ==
Tannay Port (nautical base camp), collegiate church Saint-Léger from the 13th century. This village is on the Vezelay branch of the Route of Saint Jacques de Compostelle, about 5 hours walk from the cathedral of Vézelay Abbey.

== Town partnerships ==
Tannay fosters partnerships with the following places:

- Norheim, Rhineland-Palatinate, Germany since 1967

== Notable people from Tannay ==
- André-Charles Brottier

== See also ==
- Communes of the Nièvre department
