= Eberhard Anheuser =

Co-founder of Anheuser-Busch (1806–1880)

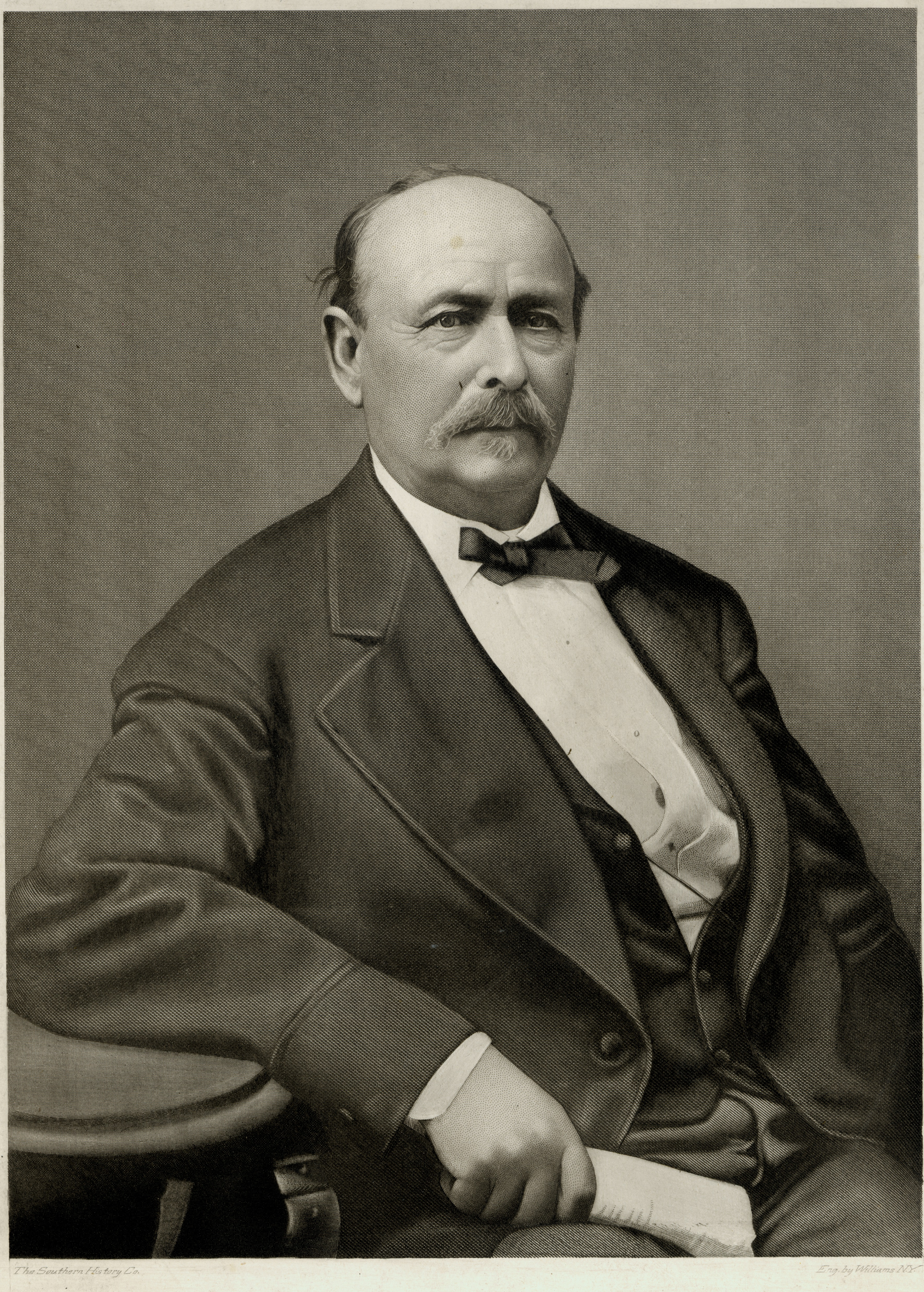
- Born: 27 September 1806; Kreuznach (Nahe), French Occupied Electoral Palatinate, First French Empire
- Died: 2 May 1880 (aged 73); St. Louis, Missouri, U.S.
- Resting place: Bellefontaine Cemetery
- Occupations: Soap and candle maker
- Known for: co-founder of Anheuser-Busch

Eberhard Anheuser (27 September 1806 – 2 May 1880) was a German-American soap and candle maker, and the father-in-law of Adolphus Busch, with whom he co-founded the Anheuser-Busch Company.

== Biography ==
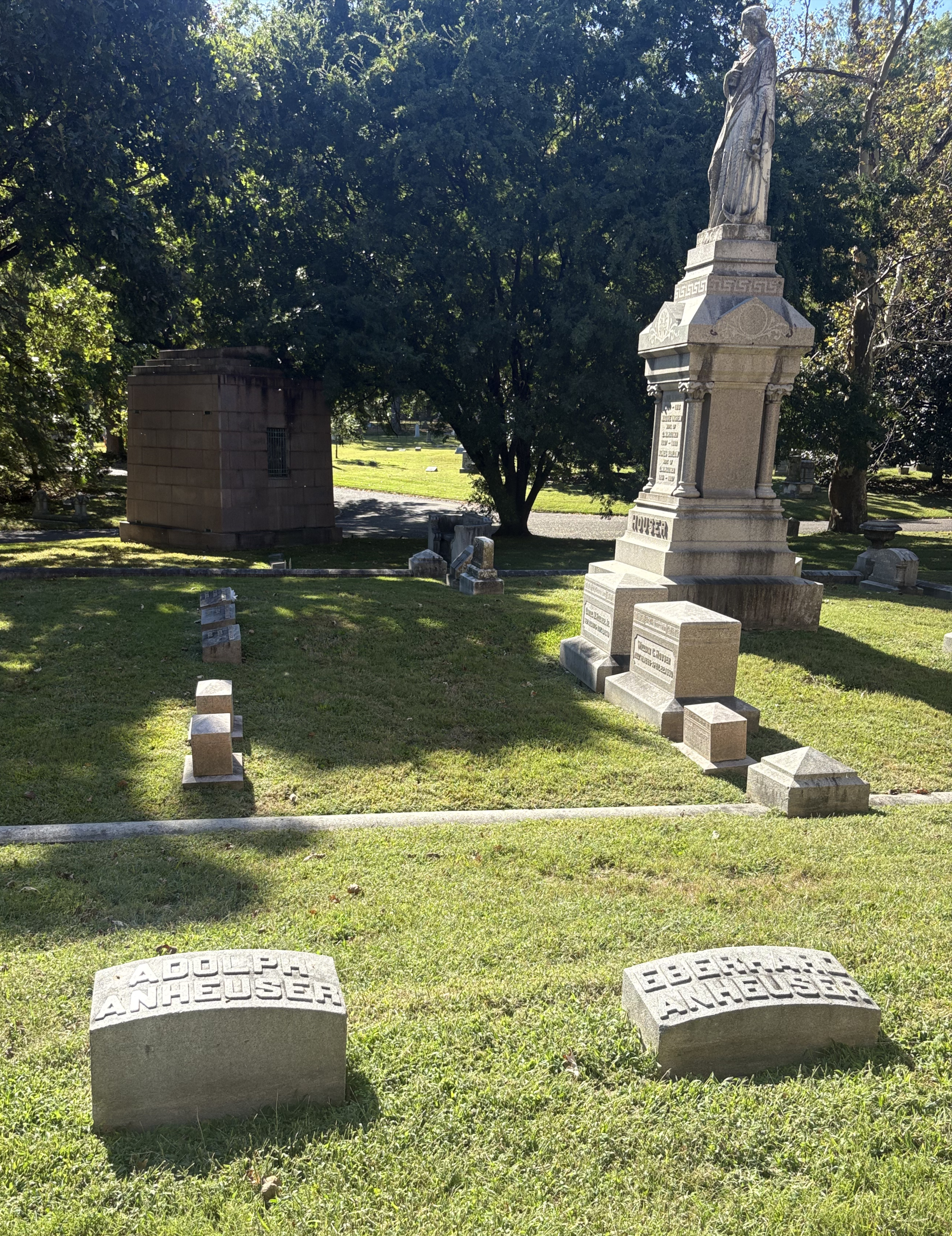
Anheuser's grave (right) at Bellefontaine Cemetery

Anheuser grew up in Kreuznach, where his parents operated a vineyard that had been in the family since 1627. Two of his brothers and he moved to North America in 1842. He was a major creditor of the Bavarian Brewery Company, a struggling brewery founded in 1853. When the company encountered financial difficulty in 1860, he purchased the minor creditors' interests and took over the company.

Eberhard Anheuser became president and CEO and changed the company name to the Eberhard Anheuser and Company. His daughter Lilly married Adolphus Busch, a brewery supply salesman, in a double wedding with Anna Anheuser (Lilly's older sister) and Ulrich Busch (Adolphus' brother) in 1861. Despite the outbreak of the Civil War, the brewery remained competitive, partially because lager was not banned by the Union Army, while hard liquors were.

As Anheuser became older, Adolphus Busch took up more of the company's duties, and the company was renamed Anheuser-Busch in 1879.

Anheuser died at his home in St. Louis on 2 May 1880, and was buried in Bellefontaine Cemetery near Adolphus Busch.

== See also ==
- Anheuser family
- Jacob Best
- Valentin Blatz
- Adolphus Busch
- Adolph Coors
- Gottlieb Heileman
- Frederick Miller
- Frederick Pabst
- Joseph Schlitz
- August Uihlein
