= Jacques Longueval =

- Born: 18 March 1680; Péronne (France)
- Died: 14 January 1735 (aged 54); Paris, France
- Occupations: Jesuit priest, Historian
- Known for: Author of Histoire de l'Église gallicane

Jacques Longueval (French pronunciation: [ʒak lɔ̃ɡval]; 18 March 1680 – 14 January 1735) was a French Jesuit priest, theologian, scholar and historian of the Catholic Church in France.

== Biography ==
Jacques Longueval was born on 18 March 1680 in Péronne, France. He entered the Jesuit novitiate on 17 September 1699. He taught grammar and humanities classes from 1700 to 1707 at the colleges of Amiens and La Flèche. Then he taught theology from 1719 to 1728, before retiring to the Professed House house in Paris, where he gathered documentation and did research for his Histoire de l’Église gallicane (History of the Gallican Church).

In recognition of his work, the Assembly of the French clergy granted him, in 1730, an annual pension of 500 pounds and a gratuity of 2,500 pounds. Unfortunately, a stroke took him into his fifty-fourth year, while he was in the process of completing the 8th volume. Longueval died on 14 January 1735 in Paris. He had almost put the finishing touches to the 9th and 10th volumes. Fathers Pierre-Claude Fontenai, Pierre Brumoy and Guillaume-François Berthier continued the eleventh and following volumes of the monumental work, which ran to 18 volumes. Among his papers is a History of Pelagianism, which was his first work.

== Écrits ==
- Traité du schisme, Bruxelles: t'Serstevens, 1718 (8vo)
- Histoire de l'Église gallicane, vol. 1–8, Paris, 1730–1734 (8vo)

== Sources ==
- Diderot, Denis; d'Alembert, Jean (1780), Encyclopédie ou Dictionnaire raisonné des sciences, des arts et des métiers, vol. XXV, Berne and Lausanne: société typographique
- Richard, Charles-Louis (1760), Dictionnaire universel, dogmatique, canonique, historique, géographique et chronologique des sciences ecclésiastiques, Paris: Jacques Rollin, Charles-Antoine Jombert et Jean-Baptiste-Claude Bauche, p. 689
- Rochemonteix, Camille de (1889), Un collège de Jésuites aux xviiie et xviiie siècles : le collège Henri IV de La Flèche, vol. 4, Le Mans: Leguicheux, p. 145
