= Guillaume-François Berthier =

Guillaume-François Berthier (French pronunciation: [ɡijom fʁɑ̃swa bɛʁtje]; 7 April 1704 – 15 December 1782) was a Jesuit professor and writer, tutor of the French Dauphin's sons, and librarian of the court library.

Berthier was born at Issoudun; he taught philosophy at Rennes and Rouen, and theology at Paris.

Berthier was one of the authors of the multi-volume Histoire de l'église Gallicane, which was started by Jacques Longueval. In 1745 he was appointed editor of the influential Jesuit periodical the Journal de Trévoux, holding the post until 1762 and doing much to expand the circulation. Because of his powerful opposition to the infidel "encyclopédistes" he was bitterly attacked, especially by Voltaire.

The Jesuits were banished from France in 1762, and Berthier promptly resigned. The Dauphin appointed Berthier tutor of his sons and librarian of the court library, but two years later his position at court became so disagreeable that he left France and spent the following ten years in Germany. On his return in 1774, he retired to Bourges, where he died on 15 December 1782.

After his death several of his works were published by Father de Querbuef: (1) A translation of the Psalms with notes (8 vols.); this was often reprinted. (2) Five volumes on Isaiah. (3) Five volumes of "Réflexions Spiritualles."
