= Jean-Antoine du Cerceau =

French writer (1670–1730)

Jean-Antoine du Cerceau (12 November 1670 – 4 July 1730) was a French Jesuit priest, poet, playwright and man of letters.

Du Cerceau taught at several Jesuit colleges, where he composed several plays for the benefit of his students, who performed them on the college grounds. His work became popular, with performances being held at court, and Du Cerceau was made private tutor go the prince of Conti. In 1730 du Cerceau was accidentally shot and killed by his pupil. He was the most popular Jesuit dramatist, and his plays would be republished many times for more than a century after his death.

== Major works ==
- Carmina, Poem in Latin, 1705
- Les Incommodités de la grandeur, Heroic Drama, 1713
- Opera. Nova editio, aucta et emendat, 1724
- Histoire de la dernière révolution de Perse, 1728
- Conjuration de Nicolas Gabrini, dit de Rienzi, tyran de Rome en 1347, completed by Pierre Brumoy, 1733
- Histoire de Thamas Kouli-Kan, Sophi de Perse, 1740–1741
- Réflexions sur la poésie françoise : où l'on fait voir en quoi consiste la beauté des vers, et où l'on donne des règles sûres pour réussir à les bien faire; avec une défense de la poësie, et une apologie pour les sçavans, 1742
- Théâtre du P. Du Cerceau à l'usage des collèges, New expanded edition of his life and works, 1822 Texte en ligne
- Œuvres de Du Cerceau, contenant son théâtre et ses poésies, new edition with notes, and a preliminary essay on the author, 1828 Text online 1 2
