= Journal de Trévoux =

Early modern French academic journal (1701–1782)

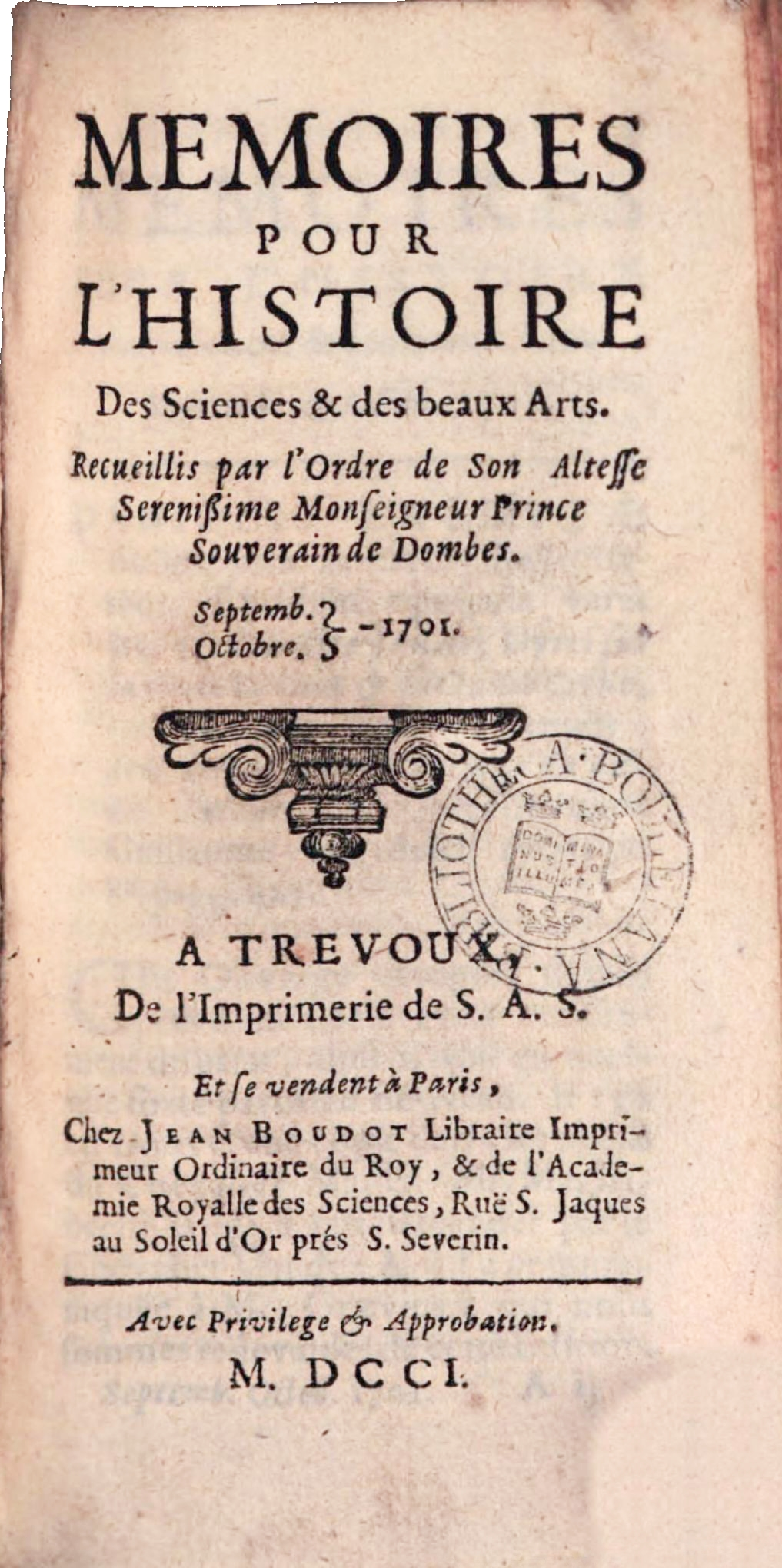
- Discipline: Multidisciplinary
- Language: French

Publication details
- History: 1701-1782
- Publisher: Society of Jesus (France)
- Frequency: Monthly

Standard abbreviations
- ISO 4: Mém. Hist. Sci. B.-Arts

The Journal de Trévoux (French pronunciation: [ʒuʁnal də tʁevu]), formally the Mémoires pour l'Histoire des Sciences & des beaux-Arts (French pronunciation: [memwaʁ puʁ listwaʁ de sjɑ̃s e de boz‿aʁ]), but often called the Mémoires de Trévoux (French pronunciation: [memwaʁ də tʁevu]), was an influential academic journal that appeared monthly in France between January 1701 and December 1782. The journal published critical reviews of contemporary books and papers on a broad range of subjects, mostly non-fiction. Its editors and most of the authors were members of the Society of Jesus (Jesuits), although they played down their connection with the order. However, when it came to questions of religion, morality or politics they did not attempt to remain neutral.

== History ==
The journal was established by Louis Auguste, Duke of Maine and ruler of the principality of Dombes to both discuss what was happening in the literary world and to stoutly defend the Catholic religion. He gave the job of editing the magazine to the Jesuits, and by 1702 it was appearing monthly. For the first thirty years of its existence (1701–1731), the Journal de Trévoux was published at Trévoux (then the capital of Dombes, now a suburb of Lyon), in the Roman Catholic Diocese of Belley-Ars.

The Jesuit theologian and philosopher René-Joseph Tournemine (1661–1739) was the founding editor. He published his article Conjectures on the Union of the Soul and Body in the journal in 1703, supporting the views of Gottfried Wilhelm Leibniz. The journal was seen as biased in its discussions of politics and religion due to its association with the Jesuits. The Memoires de Trevoux inspired the launch of various rival journals, but none lasted for long. In 1733 the Duke of Maine, tired of constant complaints, removed his protection from the editors. They moved to Paris, where they continued production until the expulsion of the Jesuits in 1762.

Among the contributing editors were Pierre Brumoy, François Catrou, one of the founding editors and one of the most prolific contributors for twelve years; Noël-Étienne Sanadon, a translator of Horace and student of antiquity; and René-Joseph Tournemine, a scholar whose nobility and purity of language was praised by Voltaire. The chief editor from 1737 to 1745 was P. de Charlevoix, formerly a missionary to Canada. He was succeeded by Guillaume-François Berthier, one of the authors of the multi-volume Histoire de l'église Gallicane, who held the post until 1762 and did much to expand the circulation. The Jesuits were banished from France in 1762, and Berthier promptly resigned. Several other editors struggled to keep it running, but by 1777 it was down to 200 subscribers. It was renamed Journal de Littérature, des Sciences et des Arts, finally disappearing in 1782.

== Philosophy ==
The criticism in the journal was generally solid, intelligent, neutral and in good taste, written by educated men who avoided excess, even in their criticism of enemies such as Voltaire. The reviews were elegantly written, and maintained a cool and polite tone, generally avoiding personal attacks. Berthier generally stated his opinions calmly and clearly, giving a solid tone to the periodical that enhanced its authority. The magazine also covered scientific and technical subjects that were unrelated to the more radical political and social concepts of the time, giving an impression of independence from government pressure. The journal supported a cosmopolitan view of culture as opposed to a narrow nationalistic one. It also took an enlightened view of science, including a belief in empiricism.

However, the journal attacked the writings of the philosophes when they attacked religion. The journal played up the evils that resulted from the beliefs of the philosophes, which would destroy public morality. The journal took Catholic orthodoxy as received truth, treating religious writings with great respect. The Journal made personal attacks on the materialists, whom it considered more dangerous even than the encyclopédistes.
