= René-Joseph de Tournemine =

French Jesuit theologian and philosopher

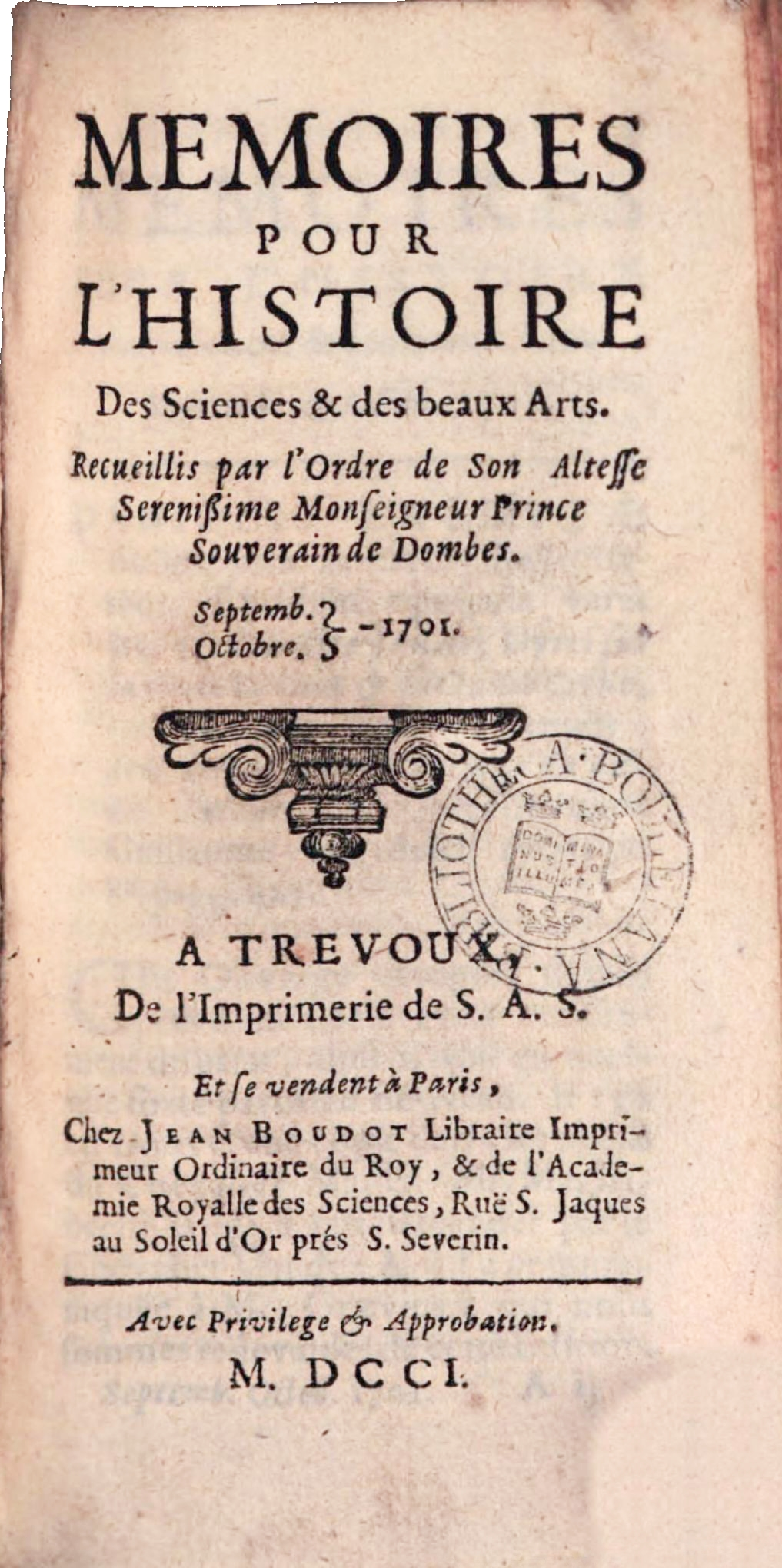

René-Joseph de Tournemine S.J. (French pronunciation: [ʁəne ʒozɛf də tuʁnəmin]; 26 April 1661, Rennes – 16 May 1739) was a French Jesuit theologian and philosopher. He founded the Mémoires de Trévoux, the Jesuit learned journal published from 1701 to 1767, and assailed Nicolas Malebranche with the charges of atheism and Spinozism.

His Réflexions sur l'athéisme originated as a preface to the Traité de l'existence de Dieu (1713) by Fénelon, and was an effective direct attack on Spinoza; it argued that 'Spinozism' wasn't practically tenable.

A debate with Leibniz on the mind-body problem was prominent in the period.

Tournemine taught the young Voltaire, and became his friend. In correspondence from 1735, however, Voltaire was critical of the Jesuit reception of Newton and Locke.
