= André-Charles Brottier =

French royalist (1751–1798)

- Born: 1751; Tannay, Nivernais
- Died: 1798 (aged 46–47)

André-Charles Brottier (1751–1798), was a French royalist who sought the violent overthrow of the Directory.

He was born to wealthy parents in town of Tannay, Nivernais in 1751. He left the town following a fire which destroyed most of his father's property. In 1794 he was recruited into the "Paris Agency" - an organisation set up by the ambassador for Spain, Fernan Nunes, to provide intelligence for his government. It was subsequently taken over by the Comte d'Antraigues.
