= Norheim =

- Municipality
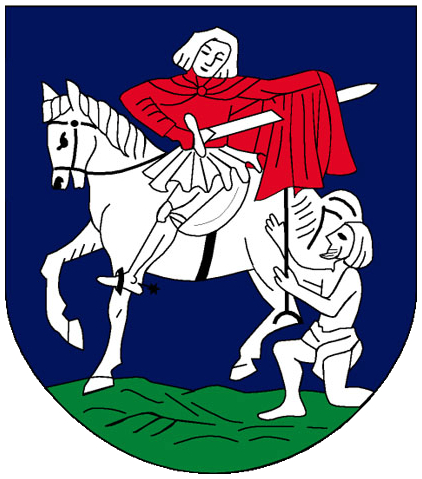
- Coat of arms

- Location of Norheim within Bad Kreuznach district
- Interactive map of Norheim
- Location within Germany Location within Rhineland-Palatinate
- Coordinates: 49°48′42″N 7°48′58″E
- Country: Germany
- State: Rhineland-Palatinate
- District: Bad Kreuznach
- Municipal assoc.: Rüdesheim

Government
  - Mayor (2024–2029): Uwe Sax (100% Norheim)

Area
  - Total: 3.15 km^{2} (1.22 sq mi)
- Elevation: 135 m (443 ft)

Population (2025-12-31)
  - Total: 1,581
  - Density: 502/km^{2} (1,300/sq mi)
- Time zone: UTC+01:00 (CET)
  - Summer (DST): UTC+02:00 (CEST)
- Postal codes: 55585
- Dialling codes: 0671
- Vehicle registration: KH
- Website: norheim.de

Norheim (in the local speech Norem) is an Ortsgemeinde – a municipality belonging to a Verbandsgemeinde, a kind of collective municipality – in the Bad Kreuznach district in Rhineland-Palatinate, Germany. It belongs to the Verbandsgemeinde of Rüdesheim, whose seat is in the like-named town. Norheim is a state-recognized tourism community (Fremdenverkehrsort). and a winegrowing village.

== Geography ==
=== Location ===
Norheim lies in the Nahe valley near the Rheingrafenstein with its castle, and near the Rotenfels. Norheim's elevation is 135 m above sea level and its municipal area measures 3.15 km^{2}.

=== Neighbouring municipalities ===
Clockwise from the north, Norheim's neighbours are the municipality of Traisen, the town of Bad Münster am Stein-Ebernburg and the municipalities of Niederhausen and Hüffelsheim, all of which likewise lie within the Bad Kreuznach district.

=== Constituent communities ===
Also belonging to Norheim are the outlying homesteads of Brunnenhof, Buchenländerhof, Wasserkraftwerk, Kronenhof and Haus am Tunnel.

=== Climate ===
Norheim is especially advantageous for its climate. Framed as it is by crags and wooded mountains, its location brings it little rain and a mild climate. Moreover, the soils that have formed from the weathering of the volcanic crags represent the best prerequisites for Norheim's winegrowing.

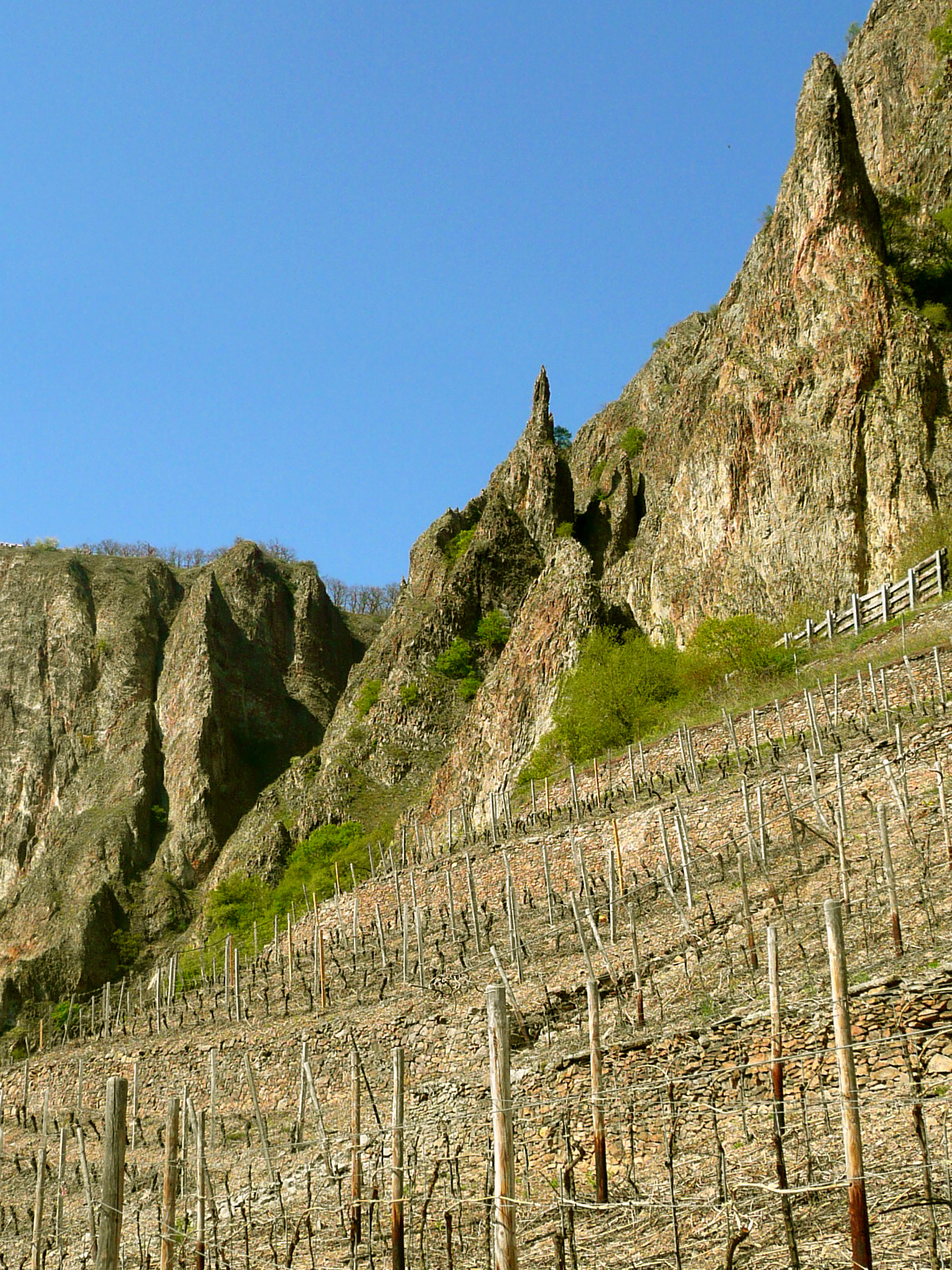
Winegrowing (Lage Rotenfels) below the porphyry massif in April

== History ==
At the foot of the porphyry massif known as the Rotenfels, Norheim has a 1,200-year-long history as the oldest wine village on the Nahe, at least going by historical records. In 766, Norheim had its first documentary mention as Narheim in pago Nahgowe ("Norheim in the Nahegau country") when the Frankish free noble Adalger sold his landhold, which lay in Narheim, for two pounds of silver to Lorsch Abbey on the Bergstraße. The record of this is contained in the abbey's old directory of holdings, the Lorsch codex (Codex Laureshamensis), document no. 2007. The name Narheim may have had its roots in nava, a Celtic word for "flowing water". Over the years, the river's name underwent various changes: Naba, Naha, Nae, Noh, Nahe. Several times over the centuries, Norheim's overlords changed as secular princes replaced those who had gone before. Adalger's old landhold was exchanged by Lorsch in 962 with Saint Maximin's Abbey in Trier. In 1190, the Lords of Bolanden were enfeoffed with the jurisdiction and holdings by the Holy Roman Empire. By way of the Rhinegraves and the Counts of Sponheim, the Lords of Sickingen at Castle Ebernburg became the village's rulers in 1440, ruling for more than 300 years. When the last lord of this line died out in 1768, the now heirless fief passed back to the overlord, the Electorate of the Palatinate. After the Napoleonic Wars had ended and after the decisions had been made at the Congress of Vienna in 1815, Norheim became Prussian and was assigned to the Oberamt of Kreuznach.

=== Population development ===
Norheim's population development since Napoleonic times is shown in the table below. The figures for the years from 1871 to 1987 are drawn from census data:

Year	Inhabitants
1815	413
1835	582
1871	611
1905	640
1939	899
1950	958
1961	1,033

Year	Inhabitants
1970	1,343
1987	1,567
1997	1,531
2005	1,430
2017	1,507
2018	1,547

== Religion ==
As at 30 November 2013, there are 1,499 full-time residents in Norheim, and of those, 539 are Evangelical (35.957%), 583 are Catholic (38.893%), 1 is Greek Orthodox (0.067%), 1 is Lutheran (0.067%), 30 (2.001%) belong to other religious groups and 345 (23.015%) either have no religion or will not reveal their religious affiliation.

== Politics ==
=== Municipal council ===
The council is made up of 16 council members, who were elected by proportional representation at the municipal election held on 9 June 2024, and the honorary mayor as chairman.

The distribution of seats of the council:

Year	SPD	CDU	FDP	FL	Total
2024	4	5	–	7	16 seats
2019	4	3	–	9	16 seats
2014	3	–	–	13	16 seats
2009	5	9	2	–	16 seats
2004	6	9	1	–	16 seats
1999	8	7	1	–	16 seats

- FL = „100% Norheim – Freie Liste der Ortsgemeinde Norheim e. V.“

=== Mayors ===
Listed in the following table are the known heads of the village and municipality of Norheim. Only four of the Schultheißen are known by name:

Date	Name	Title	Remarks
1614	Peter Munster	Schultheiß	—
1724	Johannes Sattler	Schultheiß	—
1767	Adam Witt	Schultheiß	—
Before 1800	Jakob Karst	Schultheiß	last Schultheiß
1796-1850	Franz Mund	Bürgermeister	—
1850-1874	Martin Kirsch	Bürgermeister	—
1874-1886	H. Straub	Bürgermeister	—
1887-1896	H. Scharrvogel	Bürgermeister	—
1897-1900	H. Witt	Bürgermeister	—
1900-1908	H. Singer	Bürgermeister	—
1909-1919	Nikolaus Brosius	Bürgermeister	—
1919-1922	Johann Kneip	Bürgermeister	—
1922-1934	Valentin Fickinger	Bürgermeister	—
1934-1943	Nikolaus Brosius	Bürgermeister	—
1943-1945	Christian Krieger	Bürgermeister	as deputy
1945-1948	Johann Gebhard	Bürgermeister	—
1949-1952	Franz Weirich	Bürgermeister	—
1953-1960	Johann Gebhard	Bürgermeister	—
1960-1971	Heinrich Zier	Bürgermeister	—
From 24-Sep-1971	Heinrich Zier	Ortsbürgermeister	new title at founding of Verbandsgemeinde
From 23-Oct-1972	Peter Theobald	Ortsbürgermeister	—
From 18-Apr-1974	Herbert Kirsch	Ortsbürgermeister	—
From 03-Jul-1979	Dieter Klein	Ortsbürgermeister	—
From 28-Sep-1988	Gerhard Kappler	Ortsbürgermeister	—
From 31-Aug-1989	Hermann Bickmann	Ortsbürgermeister	—
From 28-Aug-1991	Günter Lau	Ortsbürgermeister	—
From 15-Jul-2004	Ludwig Wilhelm	Ortsbürgermeister	—
From 01-Jul-2014	Dr. Kai Michelmann	Ortsbürgermeister	—
From 03-Dec-2024	Uwe Sax	Ortsbürgermeister	current mayor

Norheim's current mayor is Uwe Sax, who was sworn in on 03-Dec-2024. The deputies to the mayor are Patrick Rusch (100% Norheim), Rainer Beisiegel (CDU), and Stephan Karsch (SPD).

During the municipal election held on 09-Jun-2024 the lone candidate for mayor, Tristan Heringklee (CDU), had not reached the required absolute majority, missing it by 12 votes. Due to this a special election was held on 10-Nov-2024, during which the candidate Uwe Sax won the absolute majority, receiving a percentage of votes of 78.2%. His opponent Tristan Heringklee received a percentage of votes of 21.8%.

Uwe Sax's predecessor, Dr. Kai Michelmann, was sworn in on 01-Jul-2014. He was first voted into office at the municipal election held on 25-May-2014, with a percentage of votes of 75.2%. At the municipal election held on 26-May-2019 he was confirmed in office, with a percentage of votes of 71.44%, against his opponent Markus Karsch (SPD).

=== Coat of arms ===
The municipality's arms might be described thus: Azure on ground vert, a steed passant argent upon which Saint Martin of Tours of the same cutting with his sword a piece of his cloak gules for a kneeling beggar man of the third.

This scene from Saint Martin's life appears in many German civic coats of arms. Indeed, Norheim's arms are not even the only ones in the Bad Kreuznach district to bear this image, with Meddersheim and Rüdesheim an der Nahe likewise bearing arms depicting Martin cutting off a piece of his cloak for a beggar.

=== Town partnerships ===
Norheim fosters partnerships with the following places:

- Tannay, Nièvre, France since 1967

In 2012, Norheim and Tannay, a village and commune of several hundred inhabitants in Burgundy, marked the 45th anniversary of their partnership, an occasion that merited a visit to Norheim's Kronenhof winery by the Speaker of the Rhineland-Palatinate Landtag, Joachim Mertes, who is also Chairman of the Rhineland-Palatinate-Burgundy Partnership Association.

== Culture and sightseeing ==
=== Buildings ===
The following are listed buildings or sites in Rhineland-Palatinate's Directory of Cultural Monuments:

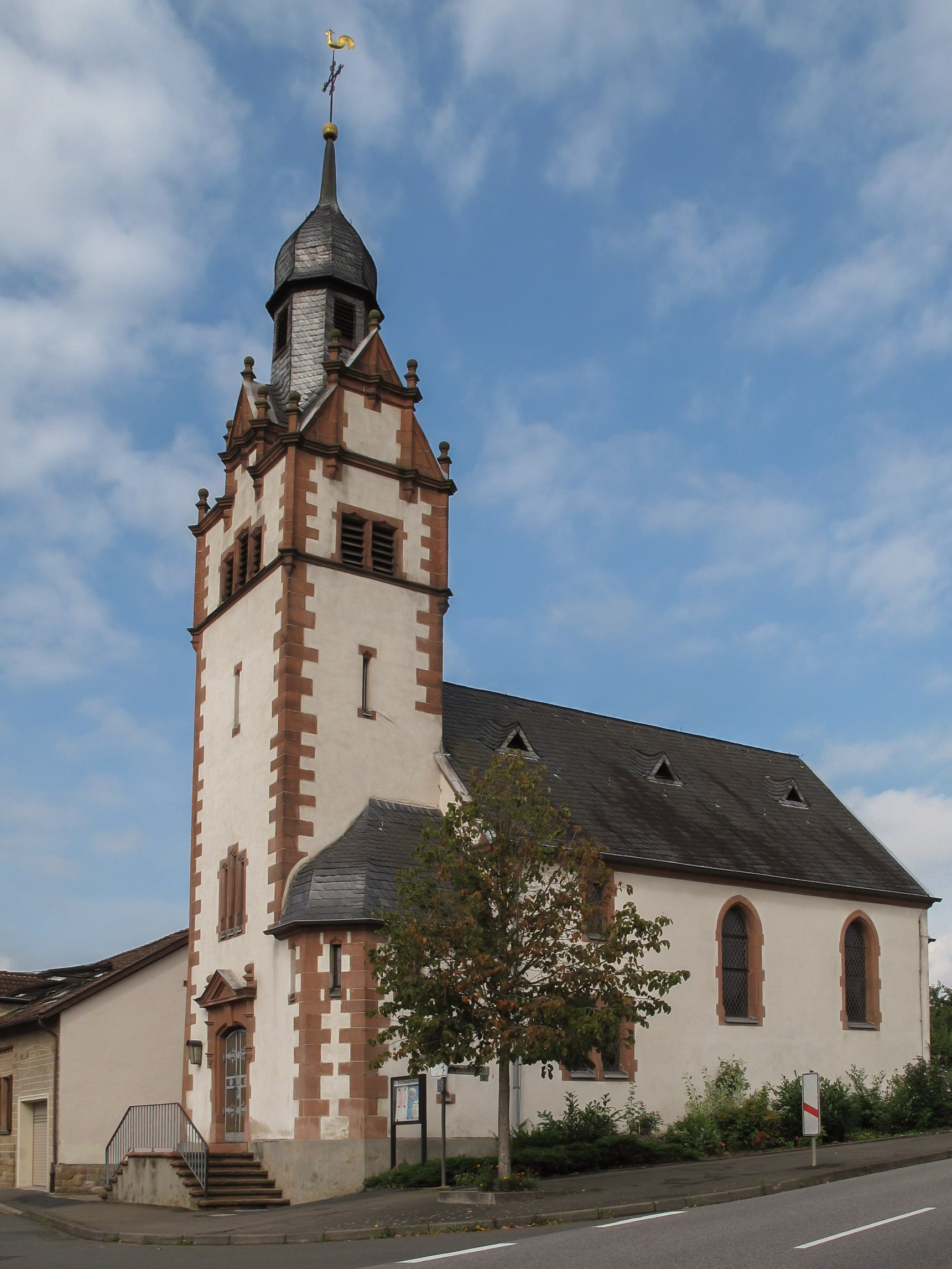
Rotenfelser Straße 39 – Evangelical church

- Evangelical church, Rotenfelser Straße 39 – plastered building with Historicist elements, Renaissance motifs, marked 1901
- Holy Cross Catholic Parish Church (Pfarrkirche Heiliges Kreuz), St.-Martin-Straße 19 – Gothic Revival quarrystone building, 1864, District Master Builder Neumann, Kreuznach, former quire tower 13th century, floor added in 1911 (see also below)
- Nahestraße – bridge, single arch, quarrystone, possibly from the earlier half of the 19th century
- Rotenfelser Straße 60 – former mill; building with half-hip roof, marked 1726 and 1821, belonging to complex stable-barns across the street, one marked 1825 (see also below)
- St.-Martin-Straße 11 – former Catholic rectory; massive Late Baroque building, marked 1764, essentially possibly older
- St.-Martin-Straße 14a – wayside cross; Baroque missionary cross, marked 1770
- Rotenfelserstraße 59 – Classicist winepress house (?) and house, from the earlier half of the 19th century
- Tunnel portal of the Bingen–Saarbrücken railway line, northeast of the village – sandstone-block, forms of castle architecture, about 1870

=== More about buildings ===
==== Roman Catholic church ====
The Roman Catholic church at Norheim was erected in stages (particularly the steeple) starting in the first half of the 13th century. From 1363, it was incorporated into the Holy Cross Foundation at Mainz. After the Reformation, and until 1698, the church was used by Protestants. It was given its Gothic Revival makeover in 1864, while the steeple was made taller in 1911 with the addition of a slated belfry and a pointed, eight-sided spire. The steeple stands at the east and earlier formed the quire. The current entrance was also pierced through the walls in 1911.

==== Mills ====
Norheim had three watermills. The oldest was the Witt'sche Mühle, which had its first documentary mention in 1471. It was an Old German channel mill with an undershot waterwheel. Ground there were grain and, according to Adam Karst (1838–1852), also oilseed. Because it was an estate mill (Bannmühle), Norheim villagers had to use it, and no other, to grind their grain. After the Witt'sche Mühle was sold to the miller Krieger, it was shut down in 1833.

The second mill is the Steinsche Mühle (as of 1910 Krugermühle). It stands 20 m below the Witt'sche Mühle and was built in 1722 with the Sickingens' baronial approval as an allodial mill. Because Norheim villagers were bound to the mill upstream from his, the then owner, Stein, had to seek custom elsewhere, in Traisen and Hüffelsheim. He also bought corn at the Kreuznacher Kornmarkt, also selling the flour there. The Krugermühle was a gristmill with its own millpond and an undershot Zuppinger wheel (a kind of waterwheel invented by the 19th-century Swiss engineer Walter Zuppinger). This mill was run for many years, and was shut down only in 1975. It gained a new lease on life in 1995 when it was fitted with a new waterwheel and an induction generator. Its then projected yearly output was roughly 200,000 kWh.

The third mill is the Weidenmühle on the road leading eastwards out of the village. It was built in 1726 by the miller Matthias Schmitt. It was an allodial mill conceded by the Sickingens in which grain was ground. It was driven by an undershot waterwheel. After the Witt'sche Mühle was shut down in the early 19th century, the Weidenmühle was Norheim's most important mill. It was shut down in 1950, though, when the last miller, Hans Brosius, died.

=== Clubs ===
The following clubs are active in Norheim:

- Angelsportverein 1957 e.V. Norheim — angling club
- CDU-Ortsverband Norheim — Christian Democratic Union of Germany local chapter
- Förderverein "Freunde der Feuerwehr Norheim" e.V. — fire brigade promotional association
- Förderverein der Grundschule Norheim — primary school promotional association
- Förderverein des katholischen Kindergarten Norheim — Catholic kindergarten promotional association
- Fördervereine Betreuende Grundschule — mentoring primary school promotional association
- Freundschaftskreis Norheim-Tannay (Frankreich) — Norheim-Tannay friendship circle
- Gesangverein Lyra Norheim 1920 e.V. Gemischter Chor — singing club/mixed choir
- Narren Freunde Norheim e.V. — Shrovetide Carnival (Fastnacht) club
- Norheimer Kultur und Theaterverein "Lampenfieber" e.V. — culture and theatre club
- Norheimer Netz Nachbarschaftshilfe e.V. — neighbourhood aid
- SPD-Ortsverband — Social Democratic Party of Germany local chapter
- Sportverein Norheim 1908 Norheim — sport club
- SV 08 Norheim — sport club
- Tennisclub Norheim Am Rotenfels e.V. — tennis club
- Theatergruppe Norheim — theatrical group
- TTSG TV Niederhausen / TV Norheim — gymnastic club
- Turnverein 1910 Norheim/Nahe e.V. — gymnastic club
- Unimogclub Gaggenau Sektion Bad Kreuznach — Unimog club
- VdK-Ortsverband Norheim — social advocacy group local chapter
- Verein für Deutsche Schäferhunde Ortsgruppe Norheim — club for German Shepherd dogs local chapter
- Verkehrs- und Verschönerungsverein Norheim-Traisen — transport and beautification club

== Economy and infrastructure ==
=== Transport ===
Running through Norheim is Landesstraße 235, which is met in the village centre by Landesstraße 236. Right at this T-junction is the railway station (actually only a halt; the building has been torn down) on the Nahe Valley Railway (Bingen–Saarbrücken). The former highway leads to Bad Münster am Stein-Ebernburg, while the latter leads to Rüdesheim an der Nahe. In both those places are found interchanges onto Bundesstraßen (41 or 48 as the case may be), which lead northeastwards to Bad Kreuznach and the Autobahn A 61 (Koblenz–Ludwigshafen) just beyond.

=== Winegrowing ===
Growing in more than 50 ha of vineyards, mainly on south-facing slopes, are grapes that the winemakers make into wine. The wines from the individual winegrowing locations – Einzellagen – of Kirschheck, Kafels, Oberberg and Dellchen enjoy international reputations.

== Famous people ==
=== Famous people associated with the municipality ===
- Kurt-Ulrich Mayer (b. 27 June 1950 in Idar-Oberstein), politician (CDU), professor and Chairman of the Saxon State Institute for Private Broadcasting and New Media (Sächsische Landesanstalt für privaten Rundfunk und neue Medien; SLM)
