= Pierre-Claude Fontenai =

French Jesuit priest and historian

- Born: 16 July 1683; Paris
- Died: 26 October 1742 (aged 59); La Flèche
- Occupation: Historian

Pierre-Claude Fontenai (16 July 1683, in Paris – 13 October 1742, in La Flèche), was an 18th-century French Jesuit priest and historian.

He was rector of the college of Orléans when he was instructed to continue the Histoire de l'Église gallicane begun by Jacques Longueval. Taking residence in the maison professe de Paris, he published volumes IX and X and prepared volume XI.

He led the observation of the solar eclipse on 12 July 1684 at the collège Louis-le-Grand.

== Texts ==
- Histoire de l'Église gallicane, vol 9 et 10, París, 1739 and 1744.

== Sources ==
- H. Beylard: Article Fontenai, Pierre-Claude dans Diccionario historico de la Compañia de Jesús, vol.II, Roma, IHSI, 2001, (p. 1483).
