= Faberrebe =

Variety of grape

- Grape (Vitis)
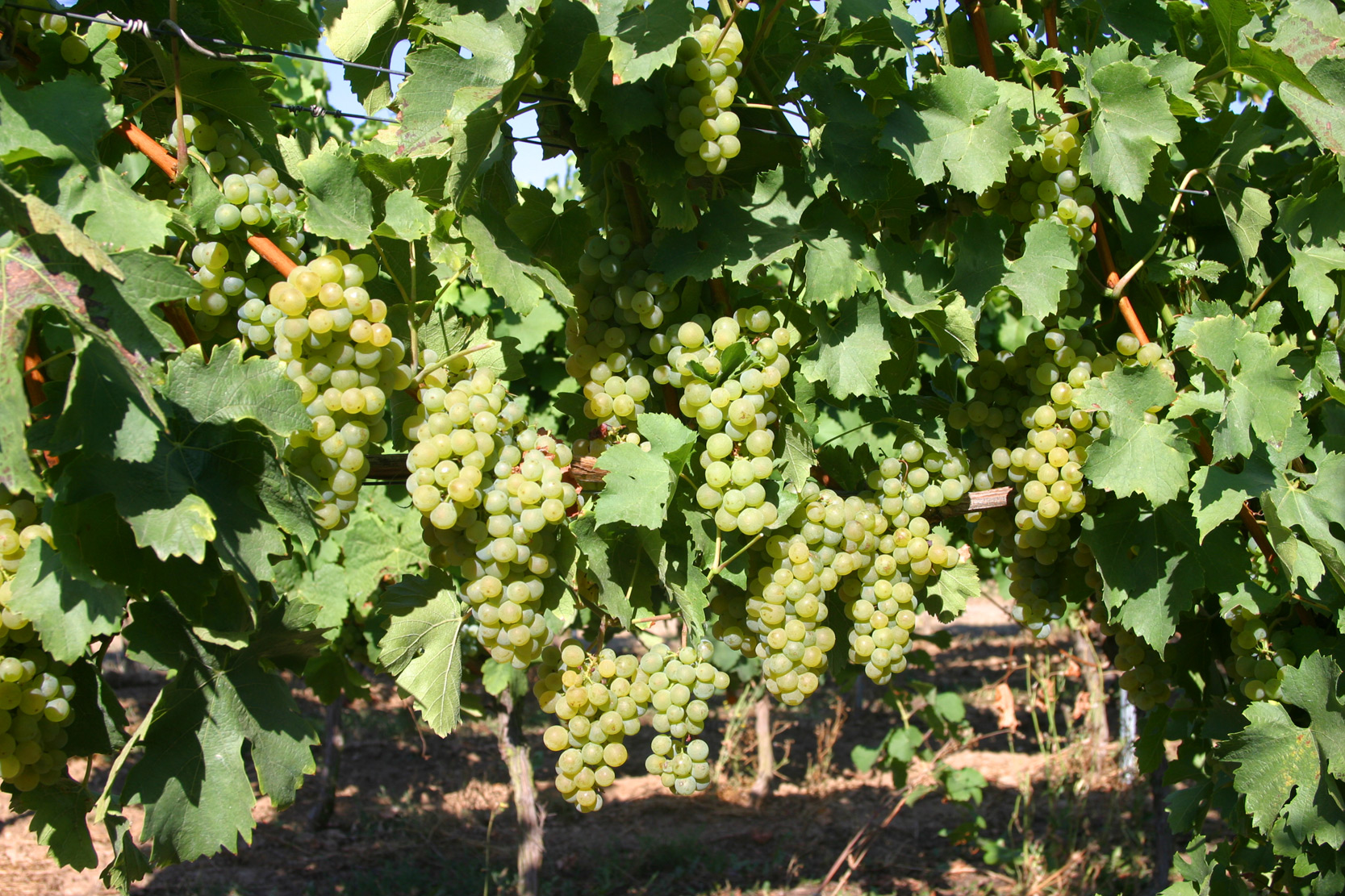
- Color of berry skin: Blanc
- Species: Vitis vinifera
- Also called: Faber, Alzey S. 10375
- Origin: Germany
- Notable regions: Rheinhessen
- VIVC number: 4029

Faberrebe or Faber is a grape variety used for white wine. It was created in 1929 by Georg Scheu at the Landesanstalt für Rebenzüchtung in Alzey and was released with varietal protection in 1967. Scheu created Faberrebe by crossing Pinot blanc and Müller-Thurgau. (Some sources erroneously state it to be a cross between Silvaner and Müller-Thurgau.)

The name "Faber" (Latin for smith) was chosen in honor of Karl Schmitt in Landau, who hosted the trial plantations. The "Rebe" suffix is German for vine.

Wines produced from Faberrebe are fruity and have rather "muscaty" aromas and a fresh taste with quite good acidity, and are light to golden yellow in colour.

In 2019, there were 250 hectares (620 acres) of Faberrebe in Germany, with a decreasing tendency. There are also some minor plantations in England.
