= Schloßböckelheim =

- Municipality
- Coat of arms

- Location of Schloßböckelheim within Bad Kreuznach district
- Interactive map of Schloßböckelheim
- Location within Germany Location within Rhineland-Palatinate
- Coordinates: 49°48′22″N 7°44′37″E
- Country: Germany
- State: Rhineland-Palatinate
- District: Bad Kreuznach
- Municipal assoc.: Rüdesheim

Government
  - Mayor (2019–24): Dr. Hartwig Suhr

Area
  - Total: 4.76 km^{2} (1.84 sq mi)
- Elevation: 125–303 m (410–994 ft)

Population (2025-12-31)
  - Total: 373
  - Density: 78.4/km^{2} (203/sq mi)
- Time zone: UTC+01:00 (CET)
  - Summer (DST): UTC+02:00 (CEST)
- Postal codes: 55596
- Dialling codes: 06758
- Vehicle registration: KH
- Website: www.schlossboeckelheim.de

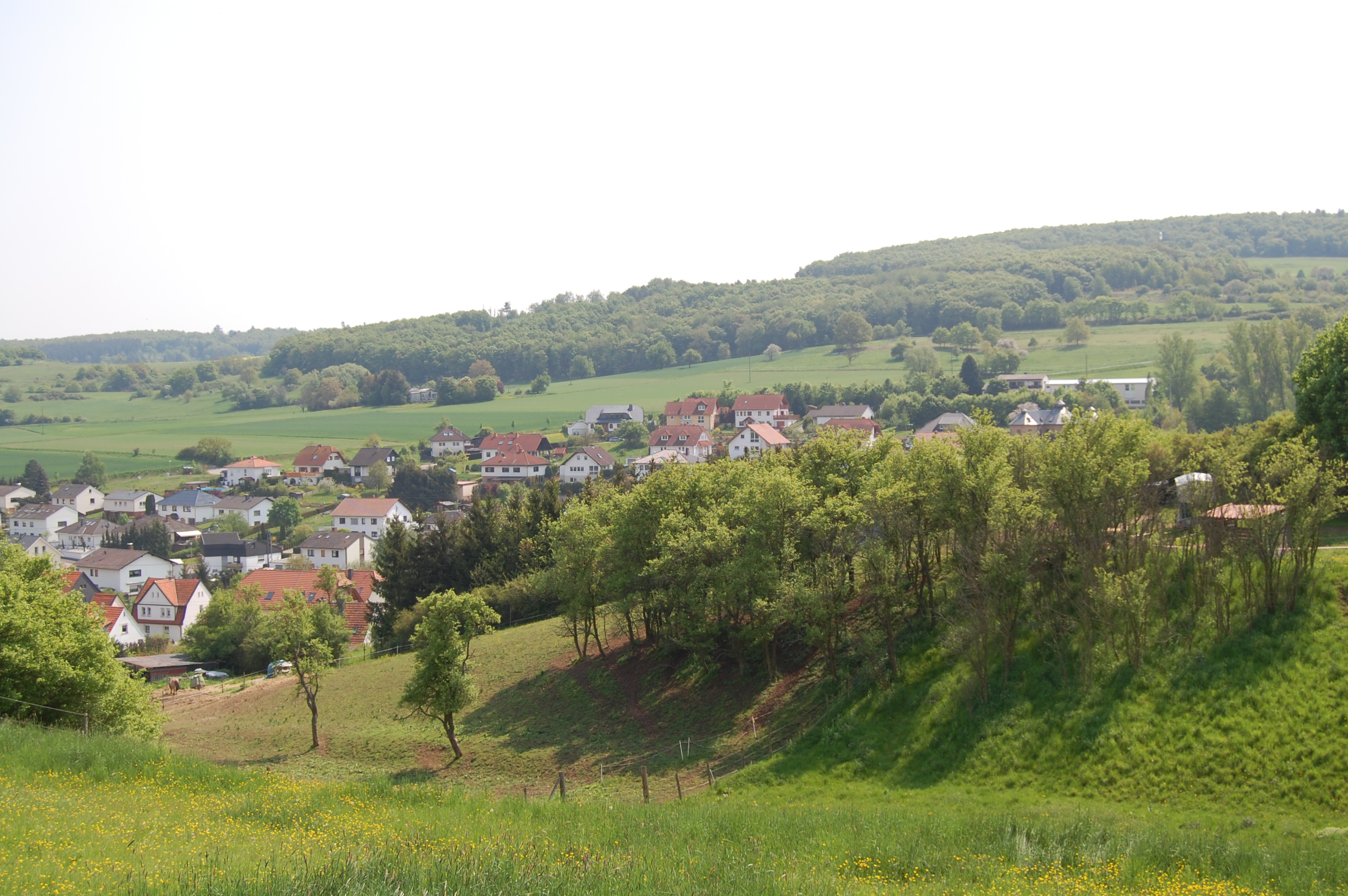
View from the northwest

Schloßböckelheim (or Schlossböckelheim) is an Ortsgemeinde – a municipality belonging to a Verbandsgemeinde, a kind of collective municipality – in the Bad Kreuznach district in Rhineland-Palatinate, Germany. It belongs to the Verbandsgemeinde of Rüdesheim, whose seat is in the municipality of Rüdesheim an der Nahe. Schloßböckelheim is a winegrowing village.

== Geography ==
=== Location ===
In terms of geographical landscape regions, Schloßböckelheim and its surrounding countryside belong to the Lower Naheland, which is framed to the northwest by the Soonwald's southern foothills, to the south by the North Palatine Uplands and to the east by Rhenish Hesse and the Rhine itself. The area lies in the west of the Nahe-Alsenz Felsenland ("rock country") at the transitional zone leading into the Sobernheim valley broadening. The village itself lies roughly 10 km southwest of the district seat of Bad Kreuznach. Schloßböckelheim sits at elevations ranging from 125 to 303 m above sea level, and its municipal area measures 4.76 km^{2}.

=== Neighbouring municipalities ===
Clockwise from the north, Schloßböckelheim's neighbours are the municipalities of Weinsheim, Hüffelsheim, Niederhausen, Oberhausen an der Nahe and Waldböckelheim, all of which likewise lie within the Bad Kreuznach district.

=== Constituent communities ===
Schloßböckelheim's Ortsteile are Tal, Kolonie and Schloss. Also belonging to Schloßböckelheim are the outlying homesteads of Hahnerhof, Niederthälerhof, Rotherhof and Schloßhof.

=== Climate ===
The Middle Naheland is part of a warm and dry area lying alee of the Hunsrück in which many rare submediterranean and subcontinental plant species can be found. Yearly precipitation in Schloßböckelheim amounts to 566 mm, which is very low, falling into the lowest fourth of the precipitation chart for all Germany. Only at 14% of the German Weather Service's weather stations are even lower figures recorded. The driest month is February. The most rainfall comes in June. In that month, precipitation is 1.6 times what it is in February. Precipitation varies slightly. Only at 3% of the weather stations are lower seasonal Schwankungen recorded.

=== Flora ===
Belonging to the scenic and botanically interesting areas of the Middle Nahe valley are the steep slopes and valley floors in and near Schloßböckelheim, conservation area. There are craggy areas, steppe grasses and dry scrub growing on volcanic subsoil. Remnants of a riparian forest in the area of the Nahe's banks define the natural vegetation around Schloßböckelheim. Winegrowing likewise defines the countryside scenery. Subcontinental plants exist in the Nahe valley along the western edge, while submediterranean ones can be found here at the northern border of their ranges. Plant communities with species that thrive in warmth colonize mostly stony and craggy slopes in the Nahe valley with southwestern exposure. Together with the "Nahegau" conservation area, Schloßböckelheim has biotopes between the Heimberg and the Schäferberg. The conservation area is part of the steep, craggy southeastern slope north of the Nahe. Because of the vegetation, this Heimberg-Schäferberg-Felsenberg landscape is sometimes compared to certain parts of central Italy or Dalmatia and the tree-sparse steppe heaths and maquis found there.

== History ==
The old name forms of Waldböckelheim (now a neighbouring municipality), Schloßböckelheim and Talböckelheim (now an outlying centre), can be traced back to an 824 document that names uilla Becchilenheim. The name Schloßböckelheim first cropped up only in the 17th century. In the 19th century, the name Thalböckelheim first came to light. On 1 November 1910, municipal council agreed to introduce Schloßböckelheim as the municipality's name. The name Talböckelheim seems to have had its spelling changed in line with the spelling reforms over the years; it is now written without the first H, but the name Schloßböckelheim itself has not been changed in the wake of the German orthography reform of 1996; the ß has not been changed to SS. The three prefixes that serve to distinguish the three centres whose names are otherwise the same are all standard German words with well understood meanings: Wald ("forest"); Schloß (or Schloss in up-to-date spelling; "castle/palace"); Tal ("dale/valley"). The village chronicle has this to say about the village's name:

Until the beginning of the last century (meant here is the 19th century) the village was named after the castle Schloßböckelheim, which still existed in the 17th century. The castle was destroyed by the French in 1688. The village of Thalböckelheim consists of the two constituent centres of Thalböckelheim and Schloßböckelheim: Schloßböckelheim with the ruin of Castle Böckelheim lies on the mountainside and the constituent centre of Thalböckelheim lies 0.5 km away down in the dale. Both constituent centres have roughly the same population figure. The village's name was changed in quite a peculiar way. In the early part of the last century, in response to an inquiry by the authorities as to what the village was called, because it consisted of two constituent centres, the name Thalböckelheim was given by the then Schöffe (roughly "lay jurist"). The Schöffe lived in the constituent centre of Thalböckelheim and a certain selfishness on his part made him want to call the village Thalböckelheim, without regard to the historical importance of the constituent centre of Schloßböckelheim. None of the locally customary rural cadastral names had to do with the name Thalböckelheim, but rather they were named after Schloßböckelheim, like Schloßböckelheimer Mühlberg, Schloßböckelheimer Felsenberg, Schloßböckelheimer Kupfergrube and so on. Wines had earned quite an important reputation as Schloßböckelheimer in the wine trade, whereas Thalböckelheim never cropped up in the wine trade. Municipal council asked on these grounds to have the historical name Schloßböckelheim reinstated, as it was already well known throughout Germany for Emperor Heinrich IV's imprisonment at Castle Böckelheim (1105).

Also given as grounds for the reversion to the older name was the name's recognizability in winegrowing and the wine trade. A decree made on 22 April 1911 approved the municipality's application. Since this time, the two constituent centres of Thalböckelheim and Schloßböckelheim have been united under the collective name "Schloßböckelheim". Among the places in the middle Naheraum (regions flanking the Nahe), Schloßböckelheim belongs among those places that were already often being mentioned in the Middle Ages. Castle Böckelheim, built on what was to become Schloßböckelheim's municipal area, was among the oldest in the region. Generally regarded as the village's first documentary mention is a document from 16 February 824. Late in 1105, Emperor Heinrich V, the last of the Salian dynasty, had his father, Emperor Heinrich IV taken prisoner in Ingelheim and then brought to Castle Böckelheim to be held prisoner there. In 1688, the Nine Years' War (known in Germany as the Pfälzischer Erbfolgekrieg, or War of the Palatine Succession) broke out. That year, the castle was destroyed on French orders.

== Religion ==
As at 31 December 2013, there are 376 full-time residents in Schloßböckelheim, and of those, 160 are Evangelical (42.553%), 163 are Catholic (43.351%), 5 (1.33%) belong to other religious groups and 48 (12.766%) either have no religion or will not reveal their religious affiliation.

== Politics ==
=== Municipal council ===
The council is made up of 8 council members, who were elected by majority vote at the municipal election held on 26 May 2019, and the honorary mayor as chairman.

=== Mayor ===
Schloßböckelheim's mayor is Dr. Hartwig Suhr, and his deputies are Volker Walg and Mario Lorenz.

=== Coat of arms ===
The municipality's arms might be described thus: Chequy of twenty azure and Or, on a chief gules a bunch of grapes leafed of one and slipped and a wheel spoked of six, both of the second.

== Culture and sightseeing ==
=== Buildings ===
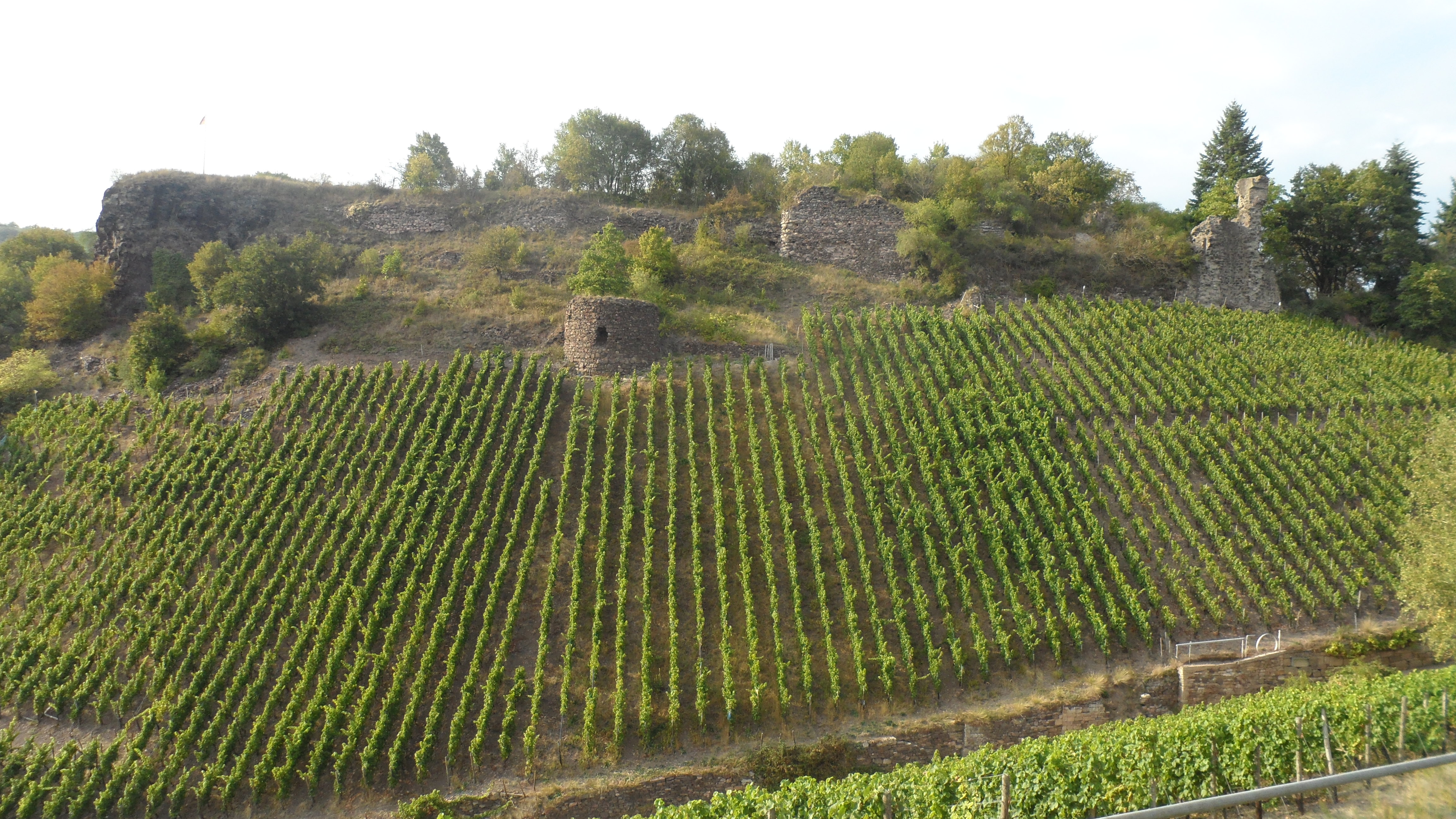
Schloßböckelheim castle ruin

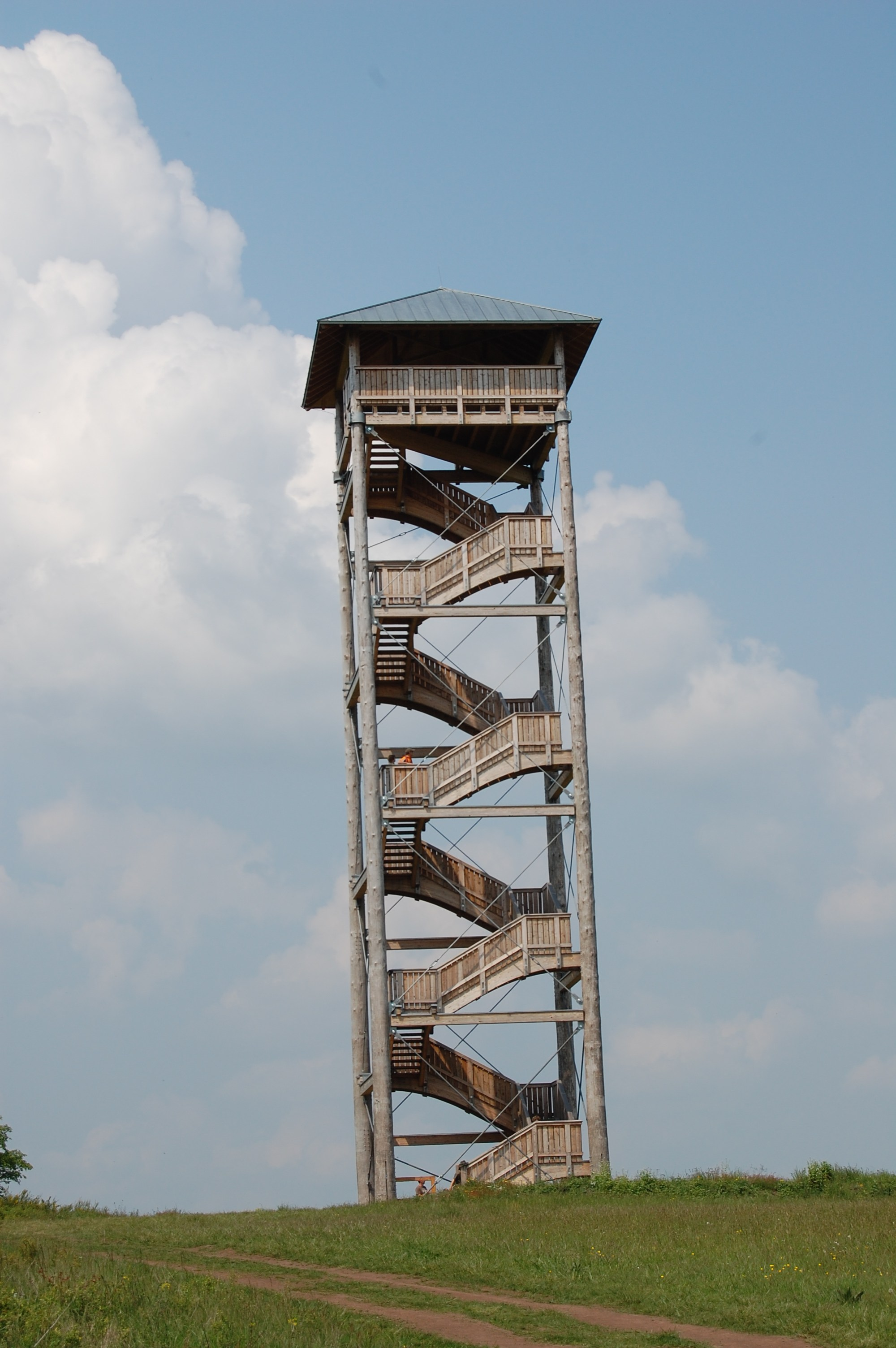
Heimbergturm

The following are listed buildings or sites in Rhineland-Palatinate's Directory of Cultural Monuments:

- Zum Felsenberg 9 – former school, with teacher's dwelling; two-winged Late Gründerzeit clinker brick building, belltower, late 19th century
- Castle Schloßböckelheim ruin – 10th and 11th centuries until 1688; remnants of ringwalls and towers, possibly mediaeval wall trace
- Vineyard house, on a craggy outcrop over the Nahe valley "Felsenberg" – Late Historicist quarrystone building built as a defensive structure, about 1900

=== Heimbergturm ===
One kilometre west of Schloßböckelheim stands a 29 m-tall lookout tower built in 2008. The so-called Heimbergturm was built on the 302 m-high Heimberg and offers a view of the Hunsrück (Erbeskopf, Berg Alteburg, Ellerspring, Gauchswald, Kandrich), the Taunus (Kalte Herberge, Hohe Wurzel, Großer Feldberg), parts of Rhenish Hesse, the Naheland (Schanzenkopf, Kuhberg, Lemberg) and the North Palatine Uplands (Donnersberg, Königsberg, Bornberg). Right nearby, the villages of Waldböckelheim, Burgsponheim, Hüffelsheim, Schloßböckelheim, Odernheim am Glan and Staudernheim can be made out.

=== Clubs ===
The following clubs are active in Schloßböckelheim:

- Angelsportgemeinschaft Schloßböckelheim e.V. — angling club
- Burgfreunde Schloßböckelheim e.V. — "castle friends"
- Club der Landeier Schloßböckelheim — "country bumpkins'" club
- Förderverein Freunde der Feuerwehr — fire brigade promotional association
- Frauenclub Schloßböckelheim — women's club
- Freiwillige Feuerwehr — volunteer fire brigade
- Fußball-Sportverein Schloßböckelheim 1921 e.V. — sport club (football, gymnastics and more)
- Rentner-Club Schloßböckelheim — pensioners' club
- Seniorentreff Schloßböckelheim — seniors' meeting

== Economy and infrastructure ==
=== Transport ===
Schloßböckelheim lies on Kreisstraße 61, which links with Landesstraße 108 to the north and Kreisstraße 58 to the south. The former leads to Waldböckelheim where there is a junction with Bundesstraße 41 running between Bad Sobernheim and Bad Kreuznach. The latter town, though, is more easily reached by driving eastwards along Landesstraße 108 and its linking roads, Landesstraßen 236 and 244 to Rüdesheimer Straße. Bad Kreuznach can also be reached along the Nahe, which is parallelled by Kreisstraße 58 and Landesstraße 235, which runs through Bad Münster am Stein-Ebernburg on the way to the district seat. Serving nearby Staudernheim is a railway station on the Nahe Valley Railway (Bingen–Saarbrücken).

=== Winegrowing ===
The following wineries can be found in Schloßböckelheim:

- Weingut und Gästehaus Wagner
- Weingut und Winzerhof Härter
- Weingut Klein & Sohn

=== Established businesses ===
Schloßböckelheim is home to an excavator company, a disk jockey business and a winery equipment company, as well as the wineries mentioned above. Schloßböckelheim also has a number of inns and holiday homes.
