= Traisen, Germany =

Traisen
- Municipality
- Coat of arms

- Location of Traisen within Bad Kreuznach district
- Interactive map of Traisen
- Location within Germany Location within Rhineland-Palatinate
- Coordinates: 49°49′13.72″N 7°49′7.29″E
- Country: Germany
- State: Rhineland-Palatinate
- District: Bad Kreuznach
- Municipal assoc.: Rüdesheim

Government
  - Mayor (2019–24): Martin Kress

Area
  - Total: 2.85 km^{2} (1.10 sq mi)
- Elevation: 185 m (607 ft)

Population (2025-12-31)
  - Total: 626
  - Density: 220/km^{2} (569/sq mi)
- Time zone: UTC+01:00 (CET)
  - Summer (DST): UTC+02:00 (CEST)
- Postal codes: 55595
- Dialling codes: 0671
- Vehicle registration: KH

Traisen is a municipality in the district of Bad Kreuznach in Rhineland-Palatinate, in western Germany.
