= Bad Kreuznach =

Place in Rhineland-Palatinate, Germany

- Town
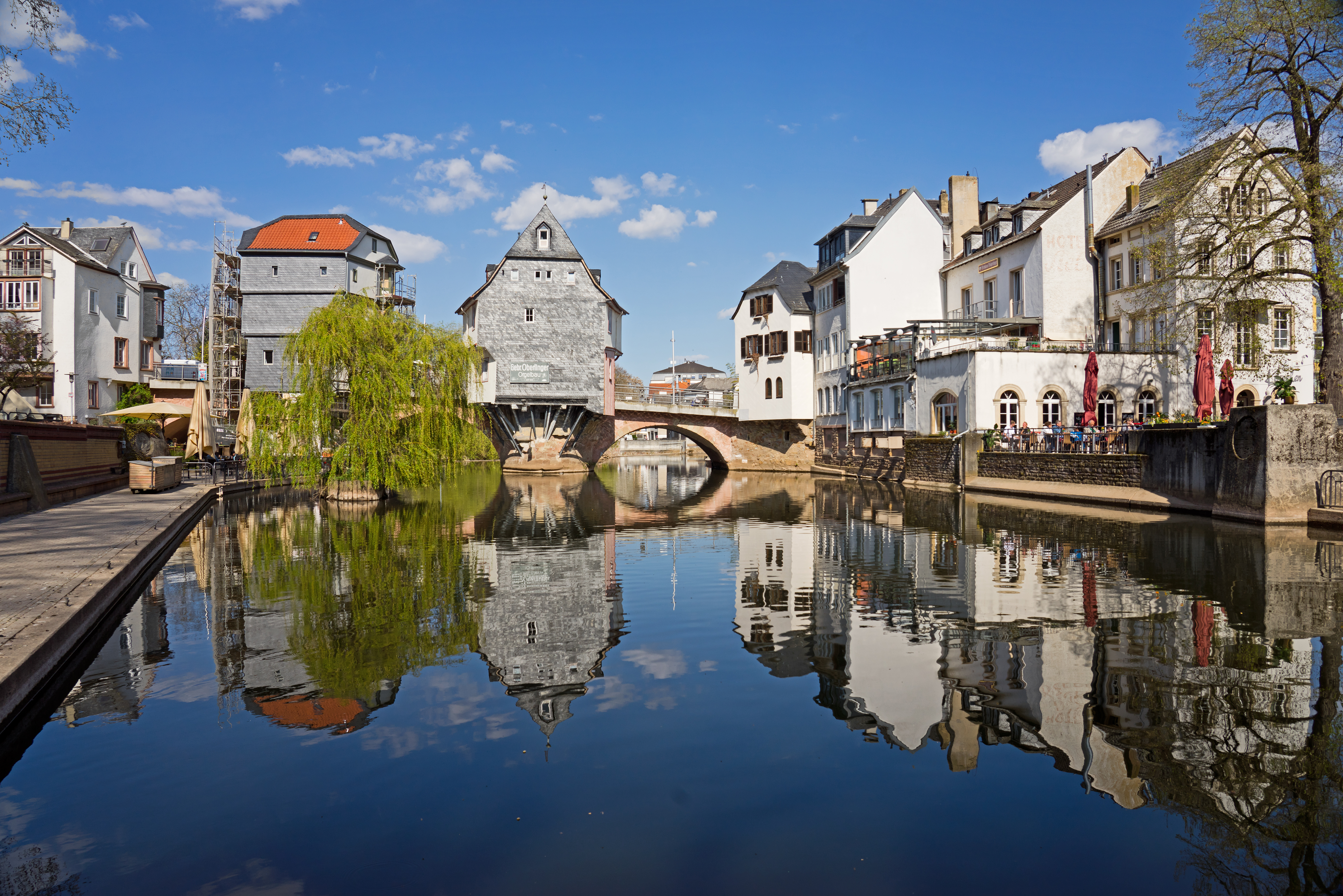
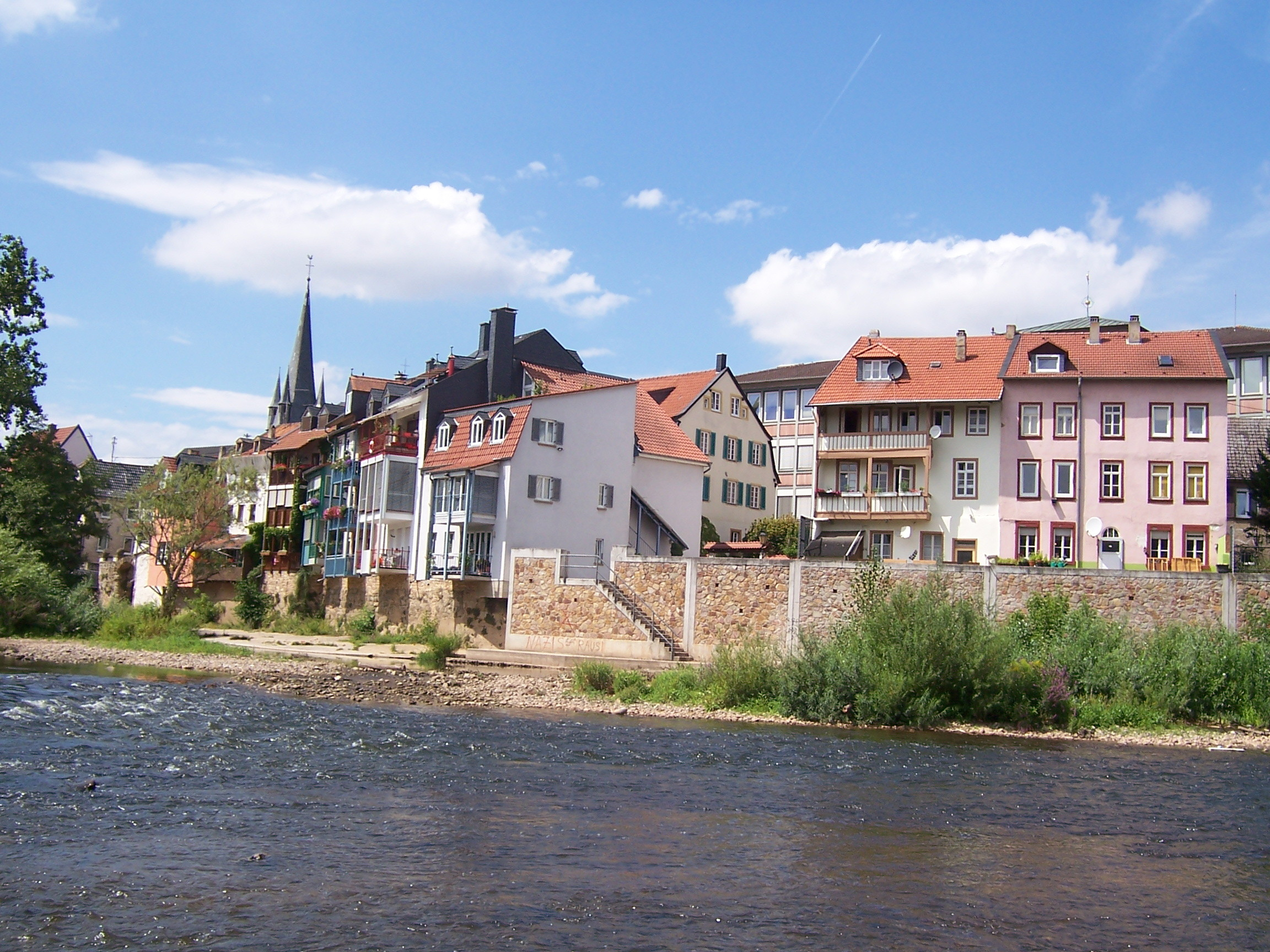
- Alte Nahebrücke Neustadt

- Coat of arms

- Location of Bad Kreuznach within Bad Kreuznach district
- Interactive map of Bad Kreuznach
- Location within Germany Location within Rhineland-Palatinate
- Coordinates: 49°51′N 7°52′E
- Country: Germany
- State: Rhineland-Palatinate
- District: Bad Kreuznach

Government
  - Mayor (2022–30): Emanuel Letz (FDP)

Area
  - Total: 55.63 km^{2} (21.48 sq mi)
- Elevation: 104 m (341 ft)

Population (2025-12-31)
  - Total: 54,347
  - Density: 976.9/km^{2} (2,530/sq mi)
- Time zone: UTC+01:00 (CET)
  - Summer (DST): UTC+02:00 (CEST)
- Postal codes: 55517-55545
- Dialling codes: 0671, 06727
- Vehicle registration: KH
- Website: www.stadt-bad-kreuznach.de

Bad Kreuznach (German pronunciation: [baːt ˈkʁɔʏtsnax]) is a town in the Bad Kreuznach district of Rhineland-Palatinate, Germany. It is a spa town, known for its medieval bridge dating from around 1300, the Alte Nahebrücke, which is one of the few remaining bridges in the world with buildings on it.

The town is located in the Nahe River wine region, renowned both nationally and internationally for its wines, especially from the Riesling, Silvaner and Müller-Thurgau grape varieties.

Bad Kreuznach does not lie within any Verbandsgemeinde, even though it is the seat of the Bad Kreuznach (Verbandsgemeinde). The town is the seat of several courts, as well as federal and state authorities. Bad Kreuznach is also officially a große kreisangehörige Stadt ("large town belonging to a district"), meaning that it does not have the district-level powers that kreisfreie Städte ("district-free towns/cities") enjoy. It is, nonetheless, the district seat, and also the seat of the state chamber of commerce for Rhineland-Palatinate. It is classed as a middle centre with some functions of an upper centre, making it the administrative, cultural and economic hub of a region with more than 150,000 inhabitants.

== Geography ==
=== Location ===
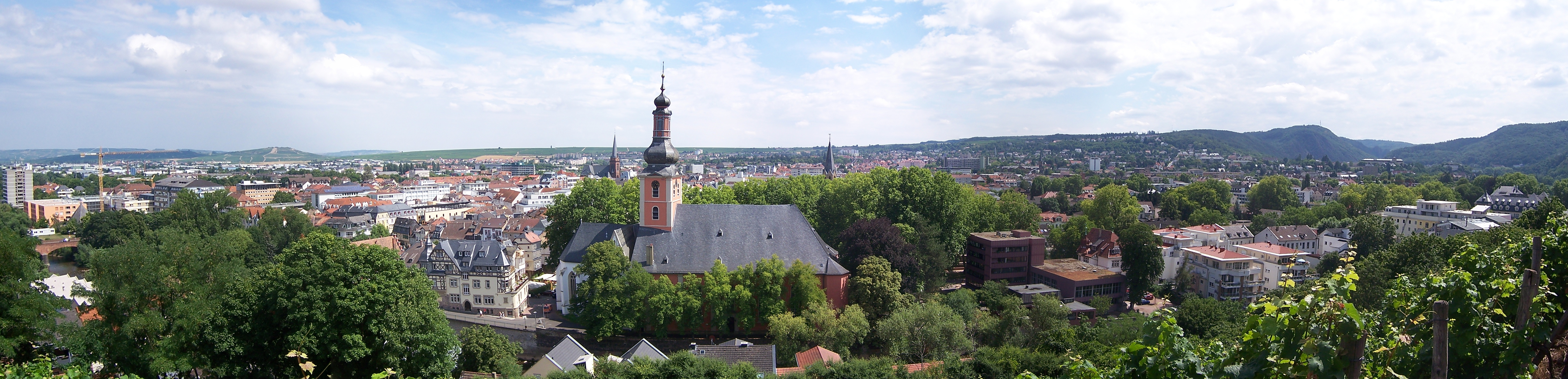
View from the Kauzenburg castle

Bad Kreuznach lies between the Hunsrück, Rhenish Hesse and the North Palatine Uplands, some 14 kilometres (8.7 mi) as the crow flies south-southwest of Bingen am Rhein. It lies at the mouth of the Ellerbach, where it empties into the lower Nahe.

=== Neighbouring municipalities ===
Clockwise from the north, Bad Kreuznach's neighbours are the municipalities of Bretzenheim, Langenlonsheim, Gensingen, Welgesheim, Zotzenheim, Sprendlingen, Badenheim (these last five lying in the neighbouring Mainz-Bingen district), Biebelsheim, Pfaffen-Schwabenheim, Volxheim, Hackenheim, Frei-Laubersheim, Altenbamberg, Traisen, Hüffelsheim, Rüdesheim an der Nahe, Roxheim, Hargesheim and Guldental.

=== Constituent communities ===
Bad Kreuznach's outlying Ortsbezirke or Stadtteile are Bosenheim, Ippesheim, Planig, Winzenheim and Bad Münster am Stein-Ebernburg.

The population of the municipality is distributed roughly as follows:

Bad Kreuznach	40,000
Winzenheim	4,300
Planig	3,000
Bad Münster am Stein	2,900
Ebernburg	1,700
Bosenheim	1,400
Ippesheim	600

=== Climate ===
Precipitation chart for Bad Kreuznach

Yearly precipitation in Bad Kreuznach amounts to 517 mm, which is very low, falling into the lowest third of the precipitation chart for all of Germany. Only at 5% of the German Weather Service's weather stations are even lower figures recorded. The driest month is January. The most rainfall comes in June. In that month, precipitation is 1.8 times what it is in January. Precipitation varies only slightly. At only 7% of the weather stations are lower seasonal swings recorded.

Climate data for Bad Kreuznach
Month	Jan	Feb	Mar	Apr	May	Jun	Jul	Aug	Sep	Oct	Nov	Dec	Year
Daily mean °C	0.5	1.9	5.3	9.1	13.5	16.7	18.4	17.8	14.4	9.7	4.8	2.0	9.5
Average precipitation mm	32.8	34.6	33.8	37.3	47.1	59.0	50.3	55.4	40.0	40.0	45.8	41.0	517.1
Daily mean °F	32.9	35.4	41.5	48.4	56.3	62.1	65.1	64.0	57.9	49.5	40.6	35.6	49.1
Average precipitation inches	1.29	1.36	1.33	1.47	1.85	2.32	1.98	2.18	1.57	1.57	1.80	1.61	20.33
Mean daily sunshine hours	1.1	2.5	3.7	5.2	6.4	6.6	6.9	6.5	5.0	3.1	1.6	1.1	4.1

== History ==
=== Antiquity ===
As early as the 5th century BC, there is conclusive evidence that there was a Celtic settlement within what are now Bad Kreuznach's town limits. About 58 BC, the area became part of the Roman Empire and a Roman vicus came into being here, named, according to legend, after a Celt called Cruciniac, who transferred a part of his land to the Romans for them to build a supply station between Mainz (Mogontiacum) and Trier (Augusta Treverorum). Kreuznach lay on the Roman road that led from Metz (Divodurum), by way of the Saar crossing near Dillingen-Pachten (Contiomagus) and the Vicus Wareswald, near Tholey to Bingen am Rhein (Bingium). About AD 250, an enormous (measuring 81 × 71 m), luxurious palace, unique to the lands north of the Alps, was built, in the style of a peristyle villa. It contained 50 rooms on the ground floor alone. Spolia found near the Heidenmauer ("Heathen Wall") have led to the conclusion that there were a temple to either Mercury or both Mercury and Maia and a Gallo-Roman provincial theatre. According to an inscription and tile plates that were found in Bad Kreuznach, a vexillatio of the Legio XXII Primigenia was stationed there. In the course of measures to shore up the Imperial border against the Germanic Alemannic tribes who kept making incursions across the limes into the Empire, an auxiliary castrum was built in 370 under Emperor Valentinian I.

=== Middle Ages ===
After Rome's downfall, Kreuznach became in the year 500 a royal estate and an imperial village in the newly growing Frankish Empire. Then, the town's first church was built within the old castrum's walls, which was at first consecrated to Saint Martin, but later to Saint Kilian, and in 1590, it was torn down. According to an 822 document from Louis the Pious, who was invoking an earlier document from Charlemagne, about 741, Saint Martin's Church in Kreuznach was supposedly donated to the Bishopric of Würzburg by his forebear Carloman. According to this indirect note, Kreuznach once again had a documentary mention in the Annales regni Francorum as Royal Pfalz (an imperial palace), where Louis the Pious stayed in 819 and 839. Kreuznach was mentioned in documents by Louis the Pious (in 823 as villa Cruciniacus and in 825 and 839, as Cruciniacum castrum or Cruciniacum palatium regium), Louis the German (in 845 as villa Cruzinacha and in 868 as villa Cruciniacum), Charles III, "the Fat" (in 882 as C[h]rucinachum, Crutcinacha, Crucenachum), Arnulf of Carinthia (in 889), Henry the Fowler (in 923), Otto I, Holy Roman Emperor (in 962 as Cruciniacus) and Frederick I, Holy Roman Emperor (in 1179 as Cruczennach). On the other hand, the Crucinaha in Emperor Otto III's documents from 1000 (which granted the rights to hold a yearly market and to strike coins) is today thought to refer to Christnach, an outlying centre of Waldbillig, a town nowadays in Luxembourg. In mediaeval and early modern Latin sources, Kreuznach is named not only as Crucenacum, Crucin[i]acum (adjective Crucenacensis, Crucin[i]acensis) and the like, but also as Stauronesus, Stauronesum (adjective Staurone[n]s[i]us; from σταυρός "cross" and νῆσος "island") or Naviculacrucis (from navicula, a kind of small boat used on inland waterways, called a Nachen in German, and crux "cross"). Sometimes also encountered is the abbreviation Xnach (often with a Fraktur X, with a cross-stroke: $\mathfrak{X}$). About 1017, Henry II, Holy Roman Emperor enfeoffed his wife Cunigunde's grandnephew, Count Eberhard V of Nellenburg, with the noble estate of Kreuznach and the Villa Schwabenheim belonging thereto. After his death, King Henry IV supposedly donated the settlement of Kreuznach to the High Foundation of Speyer in 1065, who then transferred it shortly after 1105 – presumably as a fief – to the Counts of Sponheim. On Epiphany 1147, it is said that Bernard of Clairvaux performed a miraculous healing at Saint Kilian's Church. In 1183, half of the old Frankish village of Kreuznach at the former Roman castrum – the Osterburg – burnt down. Afterwards, of the 21 families there, 11 moved to what is now the Old Town (Altstadt). In the years 1206 to 1230, Counts Gottfried III of Sponheim (d. 1218) and Johann I of Sponheim (d. 1266) had the castle Kauzenburg built, even though King Philip of Swabia had forbidden them to do so. Along with the building of this castle came the rise of the New Town (Neustadt) on the Nahe's north bank. In the years 1235 and 1270, Kreuznach was granted town rights, market rights, taxation rights and tolling rights under the rule of the comital House of Sponheim, which were acknowledged once again in 1290 by King Rudolf I of Habsburg. In 1279, in the Battle of Sprendlingen, the legend of Michel Mort arose. He is a local legendary hero, a butcher from Kreuznach who fought on the Sponheim side in the battle against the troops of the Archbishop of Mainz. When Count Johann I of Sponheim found himself in difficulties, Michel Mort drew the enemy's lances upon himself, sparing the Count by bringing about his own death. Early knowledge of the town of Kreuznach is documented in one line of a song by the minstrel Tannhäuser from the 13th century, which is preserved in handwriting by Hans Sachs: "vur creűczenach rint aűch die na". In Modern German, this would be "Vor Kreuznach rinnt auch die Nahe" ("Before Kreuznach, the Nahe also runs"). Records witness Jewish settlement in Kreuznach beginning in the late 13th century, while for a short time in the early 14th century, North Italian traders ("Lombards") lived in town. In the 13th century, Kreuznach was a fortified town, and in 1320, it withstood a siege by Archbishop-Elector Baldwin of Trier (about 1270–1336). In 1361, Charles IV, Holy Roman Emperor granted Count Walram I of Sponheim (about 1305–1380) a yearly market privilege for Kreuznach. In 1375, the townsfolk rose up against the town council. Count Walram's response was to have four of the uprising's leaders beheaded at the marketplace. Through its long time as Kreuznach's lordly family, the House of Sponheim had seven heads:

- Simon I (1223–1264)
- John I (1265–1290)
- John II (1290–1340) and Simon II (1290–1336)
- Walram (1336–1380)
- Simon III (1380–1414)
- Elisabeth (1414–1417)

In 1417, however, the "Further" line of the House of Sponheim died out when Countess Elisabeth of Sponheim-Kreuznach (1365–1417) died. In her will, she divided the county between Electoral Palatinate and the County of Sponheim-Starkenburg, bequeathing to them one-fifth and four-fifths respectively. In 1418, King Sigismund of Luxembourg enfeoffed Count Johann V of Sponheim-Starkenburg (about 1359–1437) with the yearly market, the mint, the Jews at Kreuznach and the right of escort, as far as Gensingen on the Trier-Mainz highway. In 1437, the lordship over Kreuznach was divided up between the Counts of Veldenz, the Margraves of Baden and Palatinate-Simmern. In 1457, at a time when a children's crusade movement was on the rise, 120 children left Kreuznach on their way to Mont-Saint-Michel by way of Wissembourg. In 1475, the Electoral Palatinate issued a comprehensive police act for the Amt of Kreuznach, in which at this time, no Badish Amtmann resided. Elector Palatine Philip the Upright and John I, Count Palatine of Simmern granted the town leave to hold a second yearly market in 1490. In that same year, Elector Palatine Philip bestowed ownership of the saltz- und badbronnen ("salty and bathing springs") upon his cooks Conrad Brunn and Matthes von Nevendorf. The briny springs were likely discovered in 1478; nevertheless, a Sulzer Hof in what is today called the Salinental ("Saltworks Dale") had already been mentioned in the 13th or 14th century. On 24 August 1495, There was another uprising of the townsfolk, but this one was directed at Kreuznach's Palatine Amtmann, Albrecht V Göler von Ravensburg, who had refused to release a prisoner against the posting of a bond. Nobody was beheaded this time, but Elector Palatine Philip did have a few of the leaders maimed, and then put into force a new town order.

==== Town fortifications ====
The town wall, first mentioned in 1247, had a footprint that formed roughly a square in the Old Town, and was set back a few metres from what are today the streets Wilhelmstraße, Salinenstraße and Schloßstraße, with the fourth side skirting the millpond. Serving as town gates were, in the north, the Kilianstor or the Mühlentor ("Saint Kilian's Gate" or "Mill Gate"; torn down in 1877), in the southeast the Hackenheimer Tor (later the Mannheimer Tor; torn down in 1860) and in the south the St.-Peter-Pförtchen, which lay at the end of Rossstraße, and which for security was often walled up. In the New Town, the town wall ran from the Butterfass ("Butterchurn"; later serving as the prison tower) on the Nahe riverbank up to the intersection of Wilhelmstraße and Brückes on Bundesstraße 48, where to the northwest the Löhrpforte (also called the Lehrtor or the Binger Tor; torn down about 1837) was found. It then ran in a bow between Hofgartenstraße and Hochstraße to the Rüdesheimer Tor in the southwest at the beginning of Gerbergasse, whose course it then followed down to the Ellerbach and along the Nahe as a riverbank wall. Along this section, the town wall contained the Fischerpforte or Ellerpforte as a watergate and in the south, the Große Pforte ("Great Gate") at the bridge across the Nahe. Belonging to the fortified complex of the Kauzenburg, across the Ellerbach from the New Town, were the Klappertor and a narrow, defensive ward (zwinger), from which the street known as "Zwingel" gets its name. On the bridge over to the ait (or the Wörth as it is called locally; the river island between the two parts of town) stood the Brückentor ("Bridge Gate"). To defend the town, there was, besides the castle's Burgmannen, also a kind of townsmen's defence force or shooting guild (somewhat like a town militia). Preserved as an incunable print from 1487, printed in Mainz by Peter Schöffer (about 1425–1503), is an invitation from the mayor and town council to any and all who considered themselves good marksmen with the crossbow to come to a shooting contest on 23 September.

==== Jewish population ====
On 31 March 1283 (2 Nisan 5043) in Kreuznach (קרויצנאך), Rabbi Ephraim bar Elieser ha-Levi – apparently as a result of a judicial sentence – was broken on the wheel. The execution was likely linked to the Mainz blood libel accusations, which in March and April 1283 also led to pogroms in Mellrichstadt, Mainz, Bacharach and Rockenhausen.

In 1311, Aaron Judeus de Crucenaco (the last three words mean "the Jew from Kreuznach") was mentioned, as was a Jewish toll gatherer from Bingen am Rhein named Abraham von Kreuznach in 1328, 1342 and 1343. In 1336, Emperor Louis the Bavarian allowed Count Johann II of Sponheim-Kreuznach to permanently keep 60 house-owning freed Jews at Kreuznach or elsewhere on his lands ("[...] daß er zu Creützenach oder anderstwoh in seinen landen 60 haußgesäsß gefreyter juden ewiglich halten möge [...]"). After further persecution in the time of the Plague in 1348/1349, There is no further evidence of Jews in Kreuznach until 1375. By 1382 at the latest, the Jew Gottschalk (who died sometime between 1409 and 1421) from Katzenelnbogen was living in Kreuznach and owned the house at the corner of Lämmergasse and Mannheimerstraße 12 (later: Löwensteiner Hof) near the Eiermarkt ("Egg Market"). On a false charge of usury, Count Simon III of Sponheim (after 1330–1414) had him thrown in prison and only released him after payment of a hefty ransom. He was afterwards taken into protection by Ruprecht III of the Palatinate against a yearly payment of 10 Rhenish guilders. At Gottschalk's suggestion, Archbishop Johann of the Archbishopric of Nassau-Wiesbaden-Idstein lifted the "dice toll" for Jews crossing the border into the Archbishopric of Mainz. The special taxes for Jews ordered in 1418 and 1434 by King Sigismund of Luxembourg were also imposed in Kreuznach.

In the Middle Ages, the eastern part of today's Poststraße in the New Town was the Judengasse ("Jews' Lane"). The Kleine Judengasse ran from the Judengasse to what is today called Magister-Faust-Gasse. In 1482, a "Jewish school" was mentioned, which might already have stood at Fährgasse 2 (lane formerly known as Kleine Eselsgass – "Little Ass's Lane"), where the Old Synagogue of Bad Kreuznach later stood (first mentioned here in 1715; new Baroque building in 1737; renovated in 1844; destroyed in 1938; torn down in 1953/1954; last wall remnant removed in 1975). In 1525, Louis V, Elector Palatine allowed Meïr Levi to settle for, at first, twelve years in Kreuznach, to organise the money market there, to receive visits, to lay out his own burial plot and to deal in medicines. In the earlier half of the 16th century, his son, the physician Isaak Levi, whose collection of medical works became well known as Des Juden buch von kreuczenach ("The Jew's Book of/from Kreuznach"), lived in Kreuznach. The work is preserved in a manuscript transcribed personally by Louis V, Elector Palatine. The oldest Jewish graveyard in Kreuznach lay in the area of today's Rittergut Bangert (knightly estate), having been mentioned in 1525 and 1636. The Jewish graveyard on Stromberger Straße was bought in 1661 (one preserved gravestone, however, dates from 1630) and expanded in 1919. It is said to be one of the best preserved in Rhineland-Palatinate. The Jewish family Creizenach, originally from Kreuznach, is known from records to have been in Mainz and Frankfurt am Main from 1733, and to have produced a number of important academics (Michael Creizenach, Theodor Creizenach, and Wilhelm Creizenach). The Yiddish name for Kreuznach was צלם־מקום (abbreviated צ״מ), variously rendered in Latin script as Zelem-Mochum or Celemochum (with the initial Z or C intended to transliterate the letter "צ", as they would be pronounced /ts/ in German), which literally meant "Image Place", for pious Jews wished to avoid the term Kreuz ("cross"). In 1828, 425 of the 7,896 inhabitants of the Bürgermeisterei ("Mayoralty") of Kreuznach (5.4%) adhered to the Jewish faith, as did 611 of the town's 18,143 inhabitants (3.4%) in 1890.

==== Monasteries ====
Before the Thirty Years' War, Kreuznach had some 8,000 inhabitants and seven monasteries. In the Middle Ages and early modern times, the following monasteries were mentioned:

- Saint Mary's Monastery (St. Marien-Kloster; monastery's nature legendary) or Saint Mary's Church (St. Marien-Kirche) on the ait, supposedly endowed by King Dagobert I (d. 639) on the site where Paul's Protestant Church (Pauluskirche) now stands;
- Saint Kilian's Monastery (Kloster St. Kilian; old parish church; monastery's nature unclear), in the Osterburg (old Roman castrum, Charlemagne's palace) on the Heidenmauer ("Heathen Wall") built on the site of the Constantinian Saint Martin's Church (St. Martins-Kirche), first mentioned about 741 and destroyed by the Normans about 891, tied with a hospital in 1310; in the 14th century there was a Beguine cell with prayer house; the monastery was torn down about 1590. The patrocinia of Saint Martin and Saint Kilian were then added to Saint Mary's Church on the ait;
- Augustinian convent of Saint Peter, endowed by Rhinegrave Wolfram I (III) of Stein (d. about 1179) about 1140, incorporated into the Schwabenheim Augustinian monastery in 1437, moved to the so-called Bubenkapelle ("Lads' Chapel") in 1491, reoccupied in 1495, dissolved in 1566/1568; the 15 nuns who were driven out went to Eibingen Abbey. In 1624, an attempt to reoccupy the complex by Augustinian monks failed; Jesuits settled there in 1636 and in 1648, they were granted it by agreement, today Oranienhof. The Pietà from Saint Peter, for whose reverence a forty-day indulgence was secured from Pope Alexander VI in 1502, was kept until its destruction in 1942 at St. Quintin's Church, Mainz;
- Carmelite Monastery to Saint Nicholas, so-called Schwarz-Kloster ("Black Monastery"), endowed in 1281 by the comital House of Sponheim, confirmed in 1290 by Archbishop Gerhard II of Eppstein of Mainz (about 1230–1305), dissolved in 1802;
- Saint Anthony's and Saint Catherine's Chapel (St. Antonius-und-St.-Katharinen-Kapelle; also called the Bubenkapelle) on the way into Mühlengasse ("Mill Lane"), which belonged to the Schwabenheim Augustinian monastery; it was here, right inside the town, that Count Walram of Sponheim (about 1305–1380) moved the Beguine cell from Saint Kilian's, given up in 1437; reoccupied by Augustinian nuns from 1491 to 1495, then moved to Saint Peter's;
- Saint Wolfgang's Franciscan Monastery (Franziskanerkloster St. Wolfgang), endowed in 1472 by Frederick I, Elector Palatine and Count Palatine Frederick I of Simmern, confirmed by Pope Sixtus IV, dissolved in 1802, now the Gymnasium an der Stadtmauer ("Gymnasium on the Town Wall");
- Saint Vincent's Monastery, location unclear, existed in the Thirty Years' War and later;
- Jesuit occupation about 1623, 1625 to 1632 and 1636 to 1652 in the quire of the Ait Church (Wörthkirche), later called the Bridge Church (Brückenkirche) and now Paul's Church (Pauluskirche), received in 1631 from Ferdinand II, Holy Roman Emperor Saint Peter's and took ownership in 1636. In Kreuznach, the study prefect Johann Engelbert Oliverius worked and died.

==== Plague and leprosy ====
The Plague threatened Kreuznach several times throughout its history. Great epidemics are recorded as having broken out in 1348/1349 (Johannes Trithemius spoke of 1,600 victims), 1364, 1501/1502, 1608, 1635 (beginning in September) and 1666 (reportedly 1,300 victims). During the 1501 epidemic, the humanist and Palatine prince-raiser Adam Werner von Themar, one of Abbot Trithemius's friends, wrote a poem in Kreuznach about the plague saint, Sebastian. Outside the town, a sickhouse for lepers, the so-called Gutleuthof, was founded on the Gräfenbach down from the village of Hargesheim and had its first documentary mention in 1487.

=== Modern times ===
In the War of the Succession of Landshut against Elector Palatine Philip of Electorate Palatine of the Rhine, both the town and the castle were unsuccessfully besieged for six days by Alexander, Count Palatine of Zweibrücken and William I, Landgrave of Lower Hesse, who then laid the surrounding countryside waste. The Sponheim abbot Johannes Trithemius had brought the monasterial belongings, the library and the archive to safety in Kreuznach. The besieged town was relieved by Electoral Palatinate Captain Hans III, Landschad of Steinach. In 1507, Master Faust assumed the rector's post at the Kreuznach Latin school, which had been secured for him by Franz von Sickingen. On the grounds of allegations of fornication, he fled the town only a short time afterwards, as witnessed by a letter from Johannes Trithemius to Johannes Virdung, in which Virdung was warned about Faust. Maximilian I, Holy Roman Emperor, who spent Whitsun 1508 in Boppard, stayed in Kreuznach in June 1508 and wrote from there to his daughter Duchess Margaret of Savoy. In 1557, the Reformation was introduced into Kreuznach. According to the 1601 Verzeichnis aller Herrlich- und Gerechtigkeiten der Stätt und Dörffer der vorderen Grafschaft Sponheim im Ampt Creutznach ("Directory of All Lordships and Justices of the Towns and Villages of the Further County of Sponheim in the Amt of Kreuznach"), compiled by Electoral Palatinate Oberamtmann Johann von Eltz-Blieskastel-Wecklingen, the town had 807 estates and was the seat of a Hofgericht (lordly court) to which the "free villages" of Waldböckelheim, Wöllstein, Volxheim, Braunweiler, Mandel and Roxheim, which were thus freed from the toll at Kreuznach, had to send Schöffen (roughly "lay jurists").

==== Thirty Years' War ====
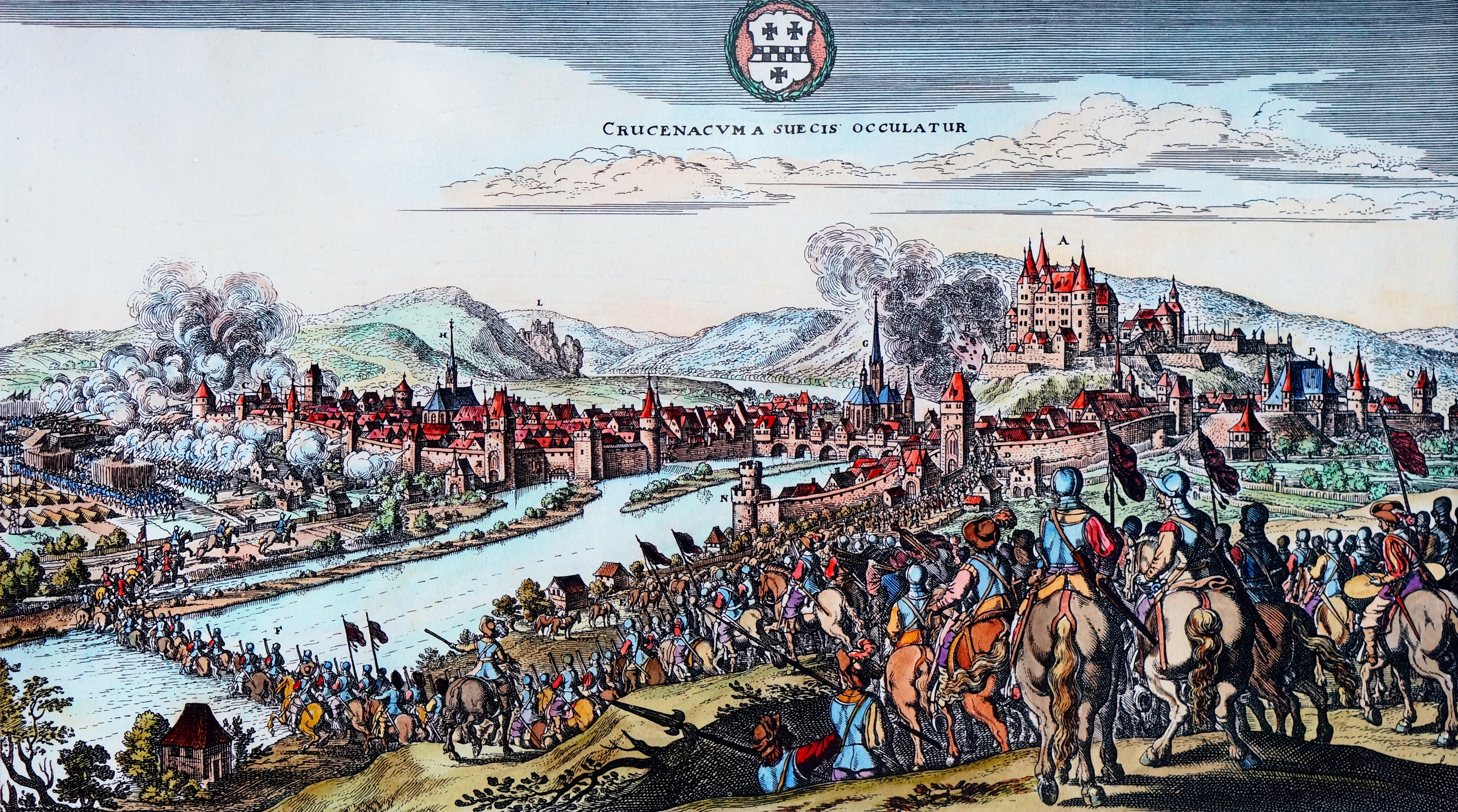
Capture of Kreuznach by Swedish troops in the Thirty Years' War, 1632

During the Thirty Years' War, Kreuznach was overrun and captured many times by various factions fighting in that war:

- 9 September 1620 [O.S. 31 August 1620] – In the Siege of Bad Kreuznach the town was taken by the Imperial-Spanish troops of General Marquis Ambrogio Spinola under Wilhelm Ferdinand von Effern. In 1621, Countess Catharina Belgica of Nassau travelled to Kreuznach to see Spinola to ask him to spare the County of Hanau-Münzenberg. The Governors General of the Lower Palatinate, based in Kreuznach, were Don Guillermo de Verdugo di Fauleria, Baron von Böhmisch-Mascha und Tuppau, Don Felipe de Sylva (d. 1644) and Louis de la Tour;
- 1 March 1632 [O.S. 20 February 1632] – Kreuznach was taken by Swedish, Saxe-Weimar and English troops under King Gustav II Adolf; the castle capitulated on 4 March 1632 [O.S. 23 February 1632]). William Craven and Sir Francis Fane of Fulbeck (about 1611–1681?) were both seriously wounded at the conquest of the castle. Serving as commanders were the Scots Colonel Alexander Ramsay (d. 1634) and Lieutenant Colonel (later General and Field Marshal) Robert Douglas. Julius Wilhelm Zincgref was installed in 1632 as the Kreuznach state scrivener by the allied Ludwig Philipp of Palatinate-Simmern;
- 14 July 1635 – Imperial troops briefly thrust their way into Kreuznach, but were repulsed by the occupation at the castle;
- 6 August 1635 [O.S. 27 July 1635] – Saxe-Weimar and French troops under Duke Bernard of Saxe-Weimar and Louis de Nogaret Cardinal de La Valette, together with the Swedes, passed through Kreuznach, later passing through once again on 19 September 1635 [O.S. 9 September 1635] as they retreated. Kreuznach's last "Swedish" commander was Colonel Johann Georg Stauff from Dirmstein;
- 20 December 1635 – Kreuznach was taken by Imperial-Spanish and Imperial-Croatian troops under General Matthias Gallas. The castle was still held by the Swedes until May 1636 under an armistice upon which both Colonel Stauff and Badish Lieutenant Colonel Bernhard Studnitzky von Beneschau (Studnický z Benešova) agreed on 9 January 1636 [O.S. 30 December 1635]. Stationed in the town were regiments headed by William, Margrave of Baden-Baden. As neutral ground, Kreuznach was placed under joint Badish and Palatinate-Simmern rule;
- 21 November 1639 [O.S. 11 November 1639] – Kreuznach was taken by French and Saxe-Weimar troops under Duke of Longueville Henri II d'Orléans, after town commander Braun von Schmidtburg zu Schweich had gone over to them;
- 27 May 1641 [O.S. 17 May 1641] – Bad Kreuznach was captured by Imperial-Bavarian and Imperial-Spanish troops under the Schillerhaas, Generalfeldwachtmeister Gilles de Haes began. An earlier attack in March 1641 had been defeated. The town capitulated on 6 June 1641 [O.S. 27 May 1641], while the fortress held out until 12 June 1641 [O.S. 2 June 1641];
- 4 November 1644 [O.S. 25 October 1644] – Kreuznach was taken by French troops under Marshal of France Henri de la Tour d'Auvergne, Vicomte de Turenne (the castle was held by the Bavarians until 26 December 1644 [O.S. 16 December 1644]) and transferred by Maréchal de camp Guy de Bar to Palatinate-Simmern.

The town was thus heavily drawn into hardship and woe, and the population dwindled from some 8,000 at the war's outbreak to roughly 3,500. The expression "Er ist zu Kreuznach geboren" ("He was born at Kreuznach") became a byword in German for somebody who had to struggle with a great deal of hardship. On 19 August 1663, the town was stricken by an extraordinarily high flood on the river Nahe.

==== Nine Years' War ====
In the Nine Years' War (known in Germany as the Pfälzischer Erbfolgekrieg, or War of the Palatine Succession), the Kauzenburg (castle) was conquered on 5 October 1688 by Marshal Louis François, duc de Boufflers. The town fortifications and the castle were torn down and the town of Kreuznach largely destroyed in May 1689 by French troops under Brigadier Ezéchiel du Mas, Comte de Mélac (about 1630–1704) or Lieutenant General Marquis Nicolas du Blé d'Uxelles. On 18 October 1689, Kreuznach's churches were burnt down.

==== 18th century ====
As of 1708, Kreuznach wholly belonged to Electoral Palatinate. Under Elector Palatine Karl III Philipp, the Karlshalle Saltworks were built in 1729. Built in 1743 by Prince-Elector, Count Palatine and Duke Karl Theodor were the Theodorshalle Saltworks. On 13 May 1725, after a cloudburst and hailstorm, Kreuznach was stricken by an extreme flood in which 31 people lost their lives, some 300 or 400 head of cattle drowned, two houses were utterly destroyed and many damaged and remaining parts of the town wall fell in. Taking part in the founding of the Masonic Lodge Zum wiedererbauten Tempel der Bruderliebe ("To the Rebuilt Temple of Brotherly Love") in Worms in 1781 were also Freemasons from Kreuznach. As early as 1775, the Grand Lodge of the Rhenish Masonic Lodges (8th Provincial Grand Lodge) of Strict Observance had already been given the name "Kreuznach". In the extreme winter of 1783/1784, the town was heavily damaged on 27–28 February 1784 by an ice run and flooding. A pharmacist named Daniel Riem was killed in his house "Zum weißen Schwan" ("At the White Swan") when it collapsed into the floodwaters.

==== French Revolutionary and Napoleonic times ====
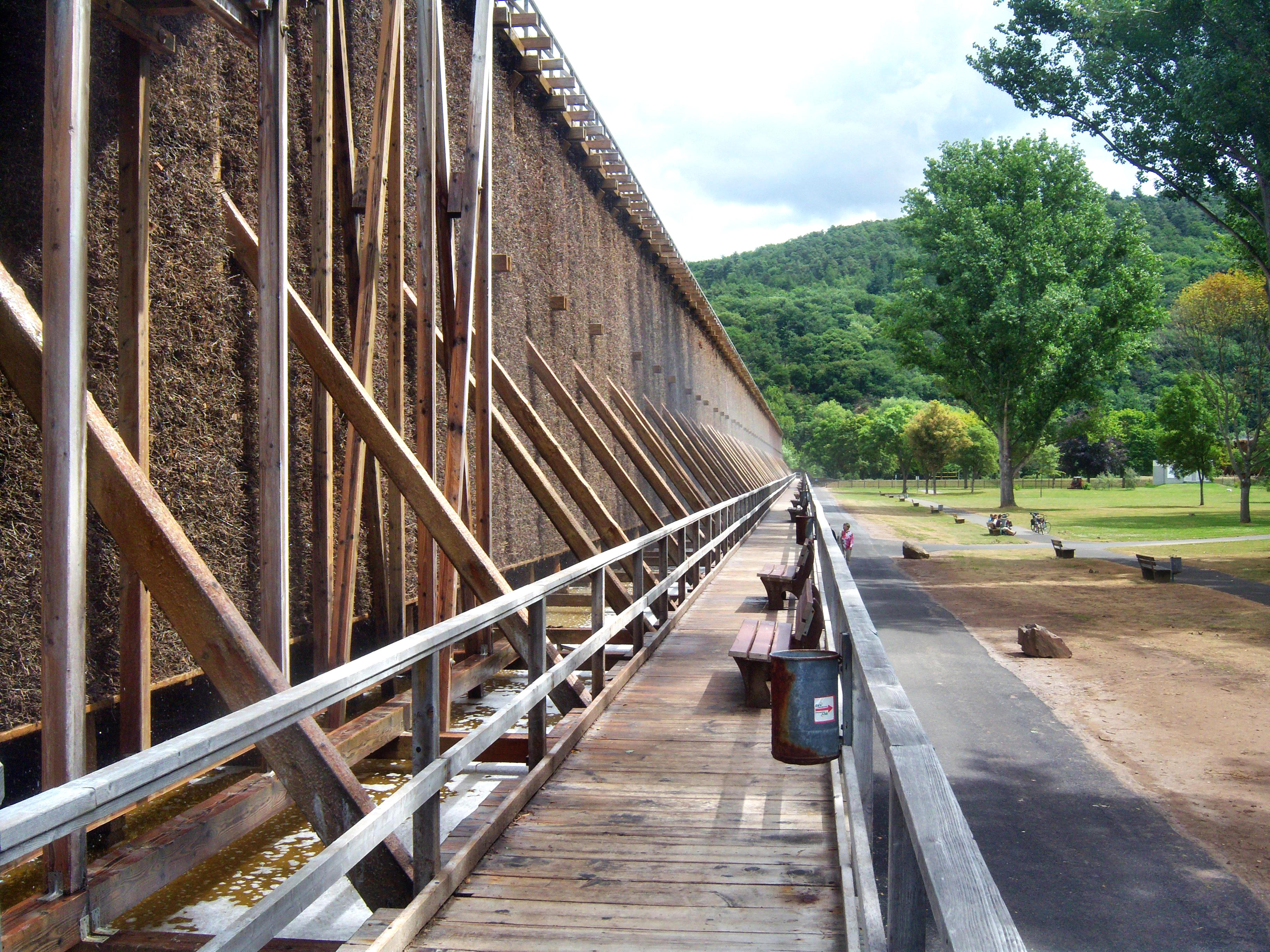
Saltworks in Bad Kreuznach

In the course of the Napoleonic Wars (1792–1814), French emigrants came to Kreuznach, among them Prince Louis Joseph of Condé. In October 1792, French Revolutionary troops under General Adam Philippe, Comte de Custine occupied the land around Kreuznach, remaining there until 28 March 1793. The town itself was briefly occupied by French troops under General François Séverin Marceau-Desgraviers on 4 January and then again on 16 October 1794. From 30 October until 1 December 1795, the town was held by Imperial troops under Rhinegrave Karl August von Salm-Grumbach, but they were at first driven out in bloody battles by Marshals Jean-Baptiste Jourdan and Jean-Baptiste Bernadotte. At this time, the town suffered greatly under sackings and involuntary contributions. After the French withdrew on 12 December, it was occupied by an Austrian battalion under Captain Alois Graf Gavasini, which withdrew again on 30 May 1796. On 9 June 1796, Kreuznach was once again occupied by the French. In 1797, Kreuznach, along with all lands on the Rhine's left bank, was annexed by the French First Republic, a deed confirmed under international law by the 1801 Treaty of Lunéville. The parts of town that lay north of the Nahe were assigned to the Arrondissement of Simmern in the Department of Rhin-et-Moselle, whereas those that lay to the south were assigned to the Department of Mont-Tonnerre (or Donnersberg in German). The subprefect in Simmern in 1800 was Andreas van Recum and in 1806 it was Ludwig von Closen. The maire of Kreuznach as of 1800 was Franz Joseph Potthoff (b. 1756; d. after 1806) and beginning in 1806, it was Karl Joseph Burret. On 20 September and 5 October 1804, the French Emperor, Napoleon Bonaparte visited Kreuznach. On the occasion of Napoleon's victory in the Battle of Austerlitz a celebratory Te Deum was held at the Catholic churches in January 1806 on Bishop of Aachen Marc-Antoine Berdolet's orders (Kreuznach was part of his diocese from 1801 to 1821). In 1808, Napoleon made a gift of Kreuznach's two saltworks to his favourite sister, Pauline. In 1809, the Kreuznach Masonic Lodge "Les amis réunis de la Nahe et du Rhin" was founded by van Reccum, which at first lasted only until 1814. It was, however, refounded in 1858. In Napoleon's honour, the timing of the Kreuznach yearly market was set by Mayor Burret on the Sunday after his birthday (15 August). Men from Kreuznach also took part in Napoleon's 1812 Russian Campaign on the French side, to whom a monument established at the Mannheimer Straße graveyard in 1842 still stands. The subsequent German campaign (called the Befreiungskriege, or Wars of Liberation, in Germany) put an end to French rule.

==== Congress of Vienna to First World War ====
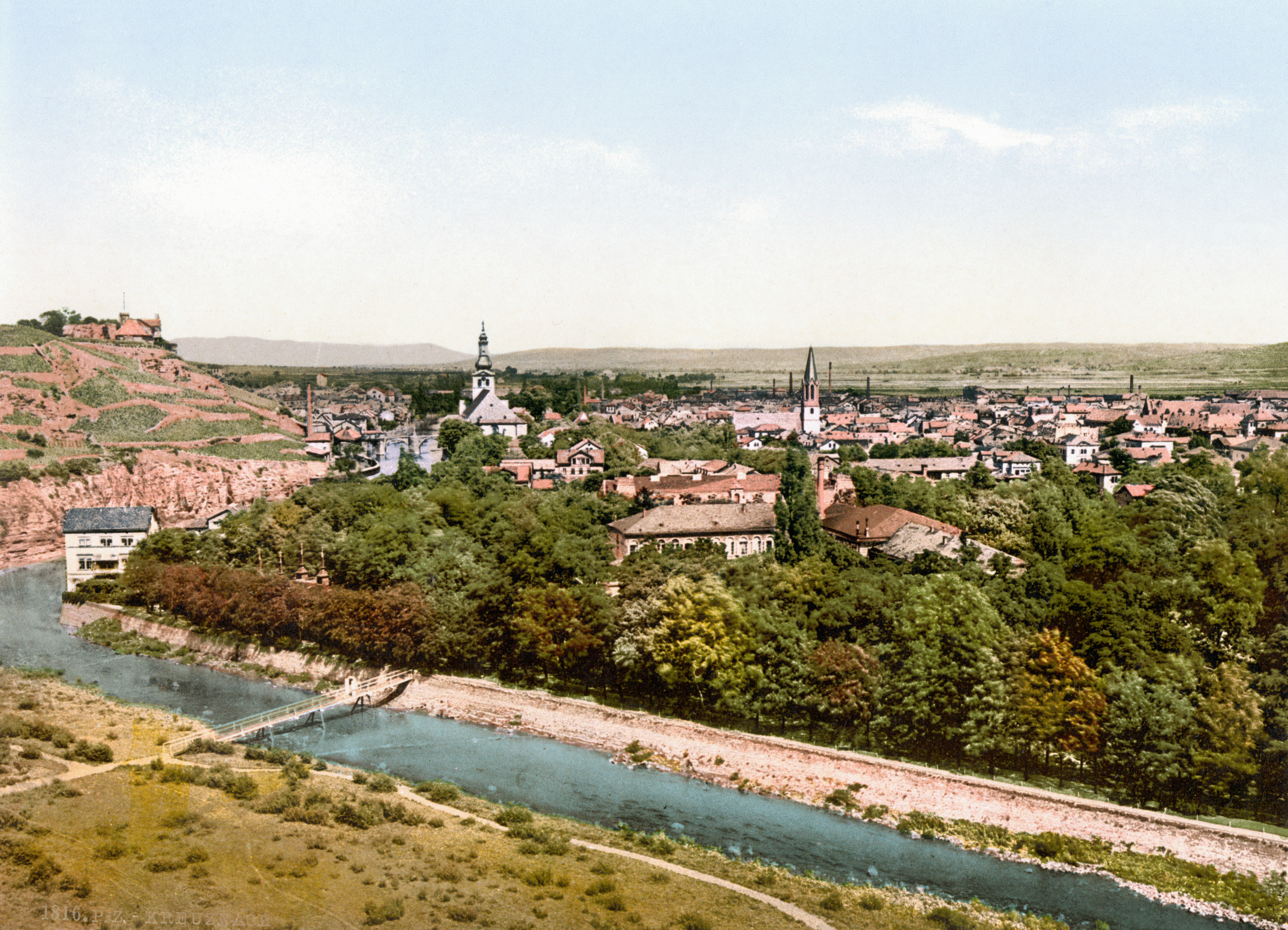
View over the town, about 1900

Until a permanent new order could be imposed under the terms of the Congress of Vienna, the region lay under joint Bavarian-Austrian administration, whose seat was in Kreuznach. When these terms eventually came about, Kreuznach passed to the Kingdom of Prussia in 1815 and from 1816 it belonged to the Regierungsbezirk of Koblenz in the province of the Grand Duchy of the Lower Rhine (as of 1822 the Rhine Province) and was a border town with two neighbouring states, the Grand Duchy of Hesse to the east and the Bavarian exclave of the Palatinate to the south. The two saltworks, which had now apparently been taken away from Napoleon's sister, were from 1816 to 1897 Grand-Ducal-Hessian state property on Prussian territory. In 1817, Johann Erhard Prieger opened the first bathing parlour with briny water and thereby laid the groundwork for the fast-growing spa business. In 1843, Karl Marx married Jenny von Westphalen in Kreuznach, presumably at the Wilhelmskirche (William's Church), which had been built between 1698 and 1700 and was later, in 1968, all but torn down, leaving only the church tower. In Kreuznach, Marx set down considerable portions of his manuscript Critique of Hegel's Philosophy of Right (Zur Kritik der Hegelschen Rechtsphilosophie) in 1843. Clara Schumann, who was attending the spa in Kreuznach, and her half-sister Marie Wieck gave a concert at the spa house in 1860. With the building of the Nahe Valley Railway from Bingerbrück to Saarbrücken in 1858/1860, the groundwork was laid for the town's industrialisation. This, along with the ever-growing income from the spa, led after years of stagnation to an economic boost for the town's development. Nevertheless, the railway was not built for industry and spa-goers alone, but also as a logistical supply line for a war that was expected to break out with France. Before this, though, right at Kreuznach's town limits, Prussia and Bavaria once again stood at odds with each other in 1866. Thinking that was not influenced by this led to another railway line being built even before the First World War, the "strategic railway" from Bad Münster by way of Staudernheim, Meisenheim, Lauterecken and Kusel towards the west, making Kreuznach into an important contributor to transport towards the west. Only about 1950 were parts of this line torn up and abandoned. Today, between Staudernheim and Kusel, it serves as a tourist attraction for those who wish to ride draisines.

In 1891, three members of the Franciscan Brothers of the Holy Cross came to live in Kreuznach. In 1893, they took over the hospital Kiskys-Wörth, which as of 1905 bore the name St Marienwörth. Since 1948, they have run it together with the Sisters of the Congregation of Papal Law of the Maids of Mary of the Immaculate Conception, and today run it as a hospital bearing the classification II. Regelversorgung under Germany's Versorgungsstufe hospital planning system. In 1901, the Second Rhenish Diakonissen-Mutterhaus ("Deaconess's Mother-House"), founded in 1889 in Sobernheim, moved under its abbot, the Reverend Hugo Reich, to Kreuznach. It is now a foundation known as the kreuznacher diakonie (always written with lowercase initials). In 1904, the pharmacist Karl Aschoff discovered the Kreuznach brine's radon content, and thereafter introduced "radon balneology", a therapy that had already been practised in the Austro-Hungarian town of Sankt Joachimsthal in the Bohemian Ore Mountains (now Jáchymov in the Czech Republic). Even though Bad Kreuznach's radon content was much slighter than that found in the waters from Brambach or Bad Gastein, the town was quickly billed as a "radium healing spa" – the technical error in that billing notwithstanding. In 1912, a radon inhalatorium was brought into service, into which was piped the air from an old mining gallery at the Kauzenberg, which had a higher radon content than the springwater. The inhalatorium was destroyed in 1945. In 1974, however, the old mining gallery itself was converted into a therapy room. To this day, radon inhalation serves as a natural pain reliever for those suffering from rheumatism. In the First World War, both the Kreuznach spa house and other hotels and villas became, as of 2 January 1917, the seat of the Great Headquarters of Kaiser Wilhelm II. The Kaiser actually lived in the spa house. Used as the General staff building was the Oranienhof. At the spa house on 19 December 1917, General Mustafa Kemal Pasha – better known as Atatürk ("Father of the Turks") and later president of a strictly secular Turkey – the Kaiser, Paul von Hindenburg and Erich Ludendorff all met for talks. Only an extreme wintertime flood on the Nahe in January 1918 led to the Oberste Heeresleitung being moved to Spa in Belgium.

==== Weimar Republic and Third Reich ====
After the First World War, French troops occupied the Rhineland and along with it, Kreuznach, whose great hotels were thereafter mostly abandoned. In 1924, Kreuznach was granted the designation Bad, literally "Bath", which is conferred on places that can be regarded as health resorts. Since this time, the town has been known as Bad Kreuznach. After Adolf Hitler and the Nazis seized power in 1933, some, among them the trade unionist Hugo Salzmann, organised resistance to National Socialism. Despite imprisonment, Salzmann survived the Third Reich, and after 1945 sat on the town council for the Communist Party of Germany (KPD). The Jews who were still left in the district after the Second World War broke out were on the district leadership's orders, taken in 1942 to the former Kolpinghaus, whence, on 27 July, they were deported to Theresienstadt. Bad Kreuznach, whose spa facilities and remaining hotels once again, from 1939 to 1940, became the seat of the Army High Command, was time and again targeted by Allied air raids because of the Wehrmacht barracks on Bosenheimer Straße, Alzeyer Straße and Franziska-Puricelli-Straße as well as the strategically important Berlin-Paris railway line, which then led through the town. The last Stadtkommandant (town commander), Lieutenant Colonel Johann Kaup (d. 1945), kept Bad Kreuznach from even greater destruction when he offered advancing American troops no resistance and yielded the town to them on 16 March 1945 with barely any fighting. Shortly before this, German troops had blown up yet another part of the old bridge across the Nahe, thus also destroying residential buildings near the bridge ends.

==== After 1945 ====
Bad Kreuznach was occupied by US troops in March 1945 and thus stood under American military authority. This even extended to one of the Rheinwiesenlager for disarmed German forces, which lay near Bad Kreuznach on the road to Bretzenheim, and whose former location is now marked by a memorial. It was commonly known as the "Field of Misery". Found in the Lohrer Wald (forest) is a graveyard of honour for wartime and camp victims. Under the Potsdam Protocols on the fixing of occupation zone boundaries, Bad Kreuznach found itself for a while in the French zone of occupation, but in an exchange in the early 1950s, United States Armed Forces came back into the districts of Kreuznach, Birkenfeld and Kusel. Until the middle of 2001, the Americans maintained four barracks, a Redstone missile unit, a firing range, a small airfield and a drill ground in Bad Kreuznach. The last US forces in Bad Kreuznach were parts of the 1st Armored Division ("Old Ironsides"). In 1958, President of France Charles de Gaulle and Federal Chancellor Konrad Adenauer agreed in Bad Kreuznach to an institutionalisation of the special relations between the two countries, which in 1963 resulted in the Élysée Treaty. A monumental stone before the old spa house recalls this historic event. On 1 April 1960, the town of Bad Kreuznach was declared, after application to the state government, a große kreisangehörige Stadt ("large town belonging to a district"). In 2010 Bad Kreuznach launched a competition to replace the 1950s addition to the Alte Nahebrücke ("Old Nahe Bridge"). The bridge, designed by competition winner Dissing+Weitling architecture of Copenhagen, was scheduled for completion by 2012.

==== Amalgamations ====
In the course of administrative restructuring in Rhineland-Palatinate, the hitherto self-administering municipalities of Bosenheim, Planig, Ippesheim (all three of which had belonged until then to the Bingen district) and Winzenheim were amalgamated on 7 June 1969 with Bad Kreuznach. Furthermore, Rüdesheim an der Nahe was also amalgamated, but fought the amalgamation in court, winning, and thereby regaining its autonomy a few months later. As part of the 2009 German federal election, a plebiscite was included on the ballot on the question of whether the towns of Bad Kreuznach and Bad Münster am Stein-Ebernburg should be merged, and 68.3% of the Bad Kreuznach voters favoured negotiations between the two towns. On 25 May 2009, the town received another special designation, this time from the Cabinet: Ort der Vielfalt – "Place of Diversity".

== Religion ==
As at 31 August 2013, there are 44,851 full-time residents in Bad Kreuznach, and of those, 15,431 are Protestant (34.405%), 13,355 are Catholic (29.776%), 4 belong to the Old Catholic Church (0.009%), 77 belong to the Greek Orthodox Church (0.172%), 68 belong to the Russian Orthodox Church (0.152%), 1 is United Methodist (0.002%), 16 belong to the Free Evangelical Church (0.036%), 41 are Lutheran (0.091%), 2 belong to the Palatinate State Free Religious Community (0.004%), 1 belongs to the Mainz Free Religious Community (0.002%), 4 are Reformed (0.009%), 9 belong to the Alzey Free Religious Community (0.02%), 2 form part of a membership group in a Jewish community (0.004%) (162 other Jews belong to the Bad Kreuznach-Koblenz worship community [0.361%] while a further one belongs to the State League of Jewish worship communities in Bavaria [0.002%]), 9 are Jehovah's Witnesses (0.02%), 1 belongs to yet another free religious community (0.002%), 5,088 (11.344%) belong to other religious groups and 10,579 (23.587%) either have no religion or will not reveal their religious affiliation.

== Politics ==
=== Town council ===
Bad Kreuznach Town Council
Total 44 seats
- Die Linke: 1
- Social Democratic Party of Germany: 8
- Alliance '90/The Greens: 5
- Electoral groups: 8
- Free Democratic Party (Germany): 4
- Christian Democratic Union of Germany: 12
- Alternative for Germany: 6

The council is made up of 44 council members, who were elected by proportional representation at the municipal election held on 9 June 2024, and the chief mayor as chairman.

The municipal election held on 9 June 2024 saw a voter turnout of 18,676 (49.2%) and yielded the following results:

Party	Share (%)	+/–	Seats	+/–
CDU	26.9	–0.8	12	0
SPD	19.3	–4.7	8	–2
AfD	13.4	+4.5	6	+2
Alliance '90/The Greens	12.4	–5	5	–3
FDP	10.0	+3	4	+1
The Left	3.1	–1.2	1	–1
Electoral groups	14.9	+4.3	8	+3

=== Mayors ===
Bad Kreuznach's current mayor (Oberbürgermeister) is Emanuel Letz, elected in March 2022. Listed here are Bad Kreuznach's mayors since Napoleonic times:

- 1800–1806 Franz Joseph Potthoff
- 1806–1813 Carl Josef Burret
- 1813–1814 Jacob Friedrich Karcher
- 1814– Stanislaus Schmitt
- 1814–1817 Joseph Dheil (Theil)
- 1817–1818 Ruprecht
- 1819–1845 Franz Xaver Buß
- 1845–1846 Karl Joseph Movius
- 1846–1850 Berthold
- 1851–1875 Heinrich Küppers
- 1875–1881 Gerhard Bunnemann
- 1881–1896 Felix Albert Scheibner
- 1897– Hermann Bemme
- 1897–1909 Rudolf Kirschstein
- 1909–1914 Karl Schleicher
- 1917–1919 Hans Körnicke
- 1921–1933 Robert Fischer
- 1934–1942 Friedrich Wetzler
- 1945– Viktor Risse
- 1945–1947 Robert Fischer
- 1947–1949 Willibald Hamburger
- 1949–1952 Josef Kohns
- 1952–1956 Ludwig Jungermann (CDU)
- 1957–1967 Gerhard Muhs (FDP)
- 1967–1985 Peter Fink (SPD)
- 1985–1995 Helmut Schwindt (SPD)
- 1995–2003 Rolf Ebbeke (CDU)
- 2003–2011 Andreas Ludwig (CDU)
- 2011–2022 Heike Kaster-Meurer (SPD)
- 2022–present Emanuel Letz (FDP)

=== Coat of arms ===
The town's arms might be described thus: On an escutcheon argent ensigned with a town wall with three towers all embattled Or, a fess countercompony Or and azure between three crosses pattée sable.

Bad Kreuznach's right to bear arms comes from municipal law for the state of Rhineland-Palatinate. The three crosses pattée (that is, with the ends somewhat broader than the rest of the crosses' arms) are a canting charge, referring to the town's name, the German word for "cross" being Kreuz. The crosses are sometimes wrongly taken to be Christian crosses. In fact, the name Kreuznach developed out of the Celtic-Latin word Cruciniacum, which meant "Crucinius's Home", thus a man's name with the suffix —acum added, meaning "flowing water". The coat of arms first appeared with this composition on the keystone at Saint Nicholas's Church in the late 13th century. The mural crown on top of the escutcheon began appearing only about 1800 under French rule. The stylised stretch of town wall was originally rendered reddish-brown, but it usually appears gold nowadays.

== Twin towns – sister cities ==
Bad Kreuznach is twinned with:

- Bourg-en-Bresse, France (1963);
- Neuruppin, Germany (1990).

== Culture and sightseeing ==
=== Buildings ===
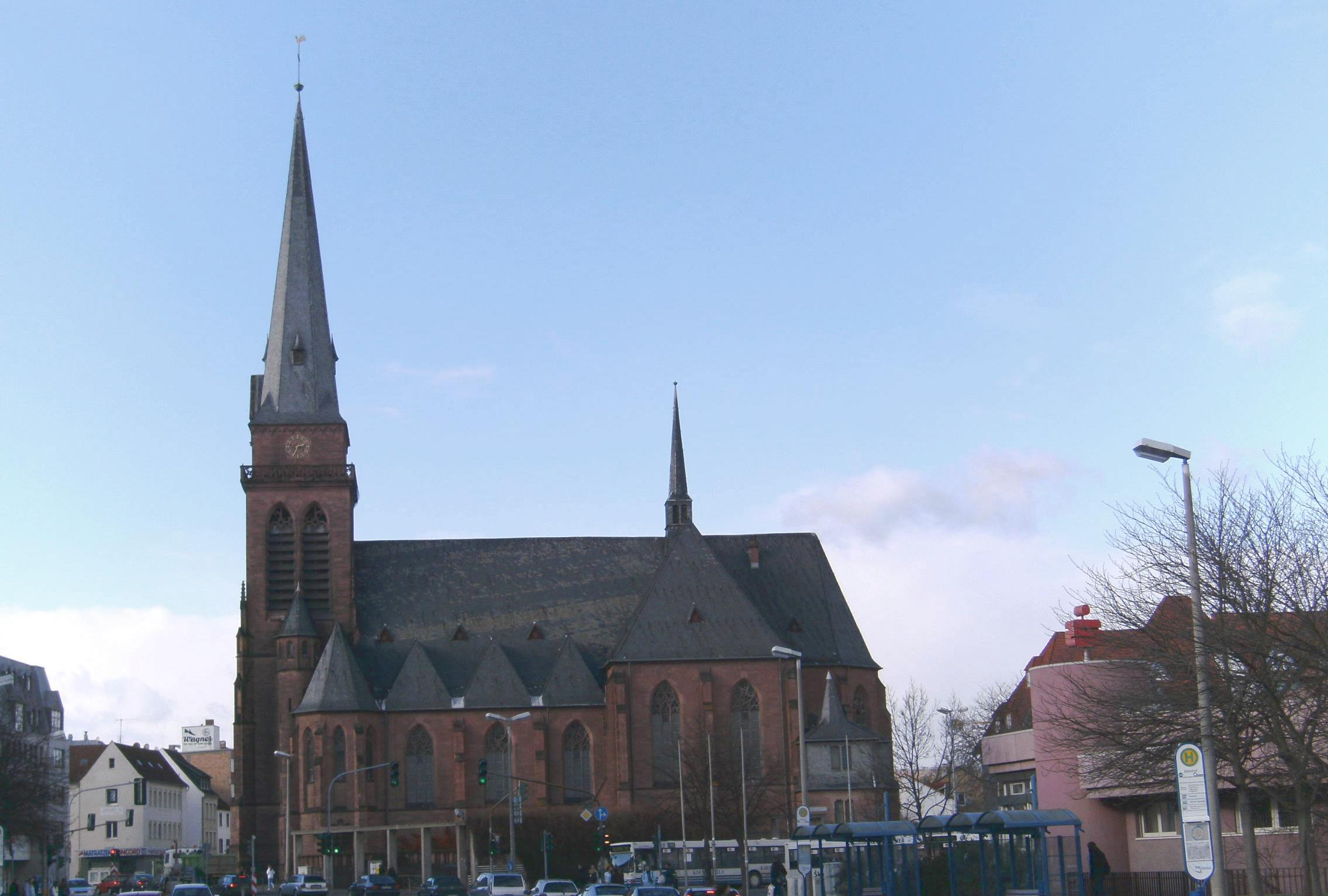
Wilhelmstraße 39 – Holy Cross Catholic Parish Church

The following are listed buildings or sites in Rhineland-Palatinate's Directory of Cultural Monuments:

==== Bad Kreuznach (main centre) ====
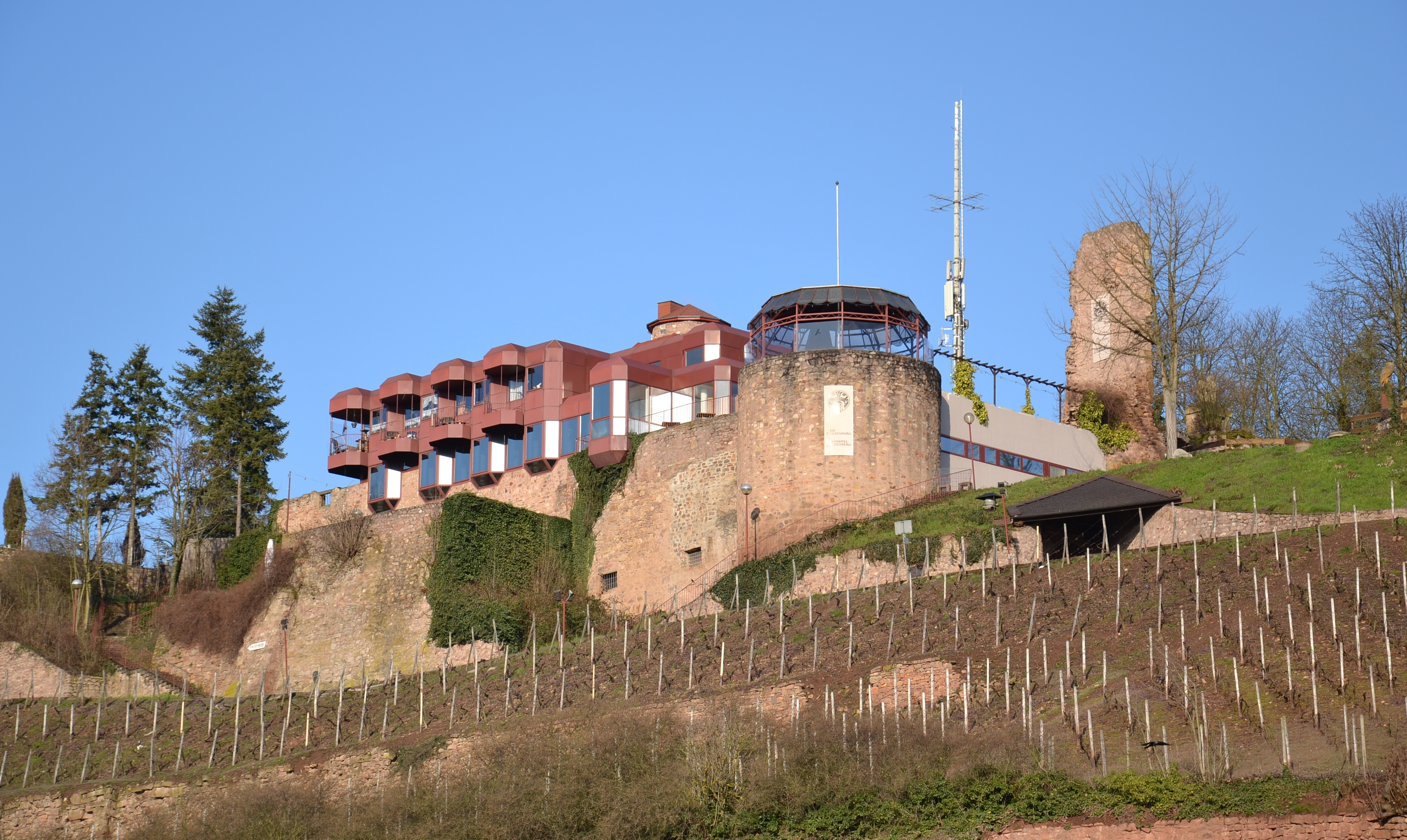
On the Kauzenberg – Kauzenburg

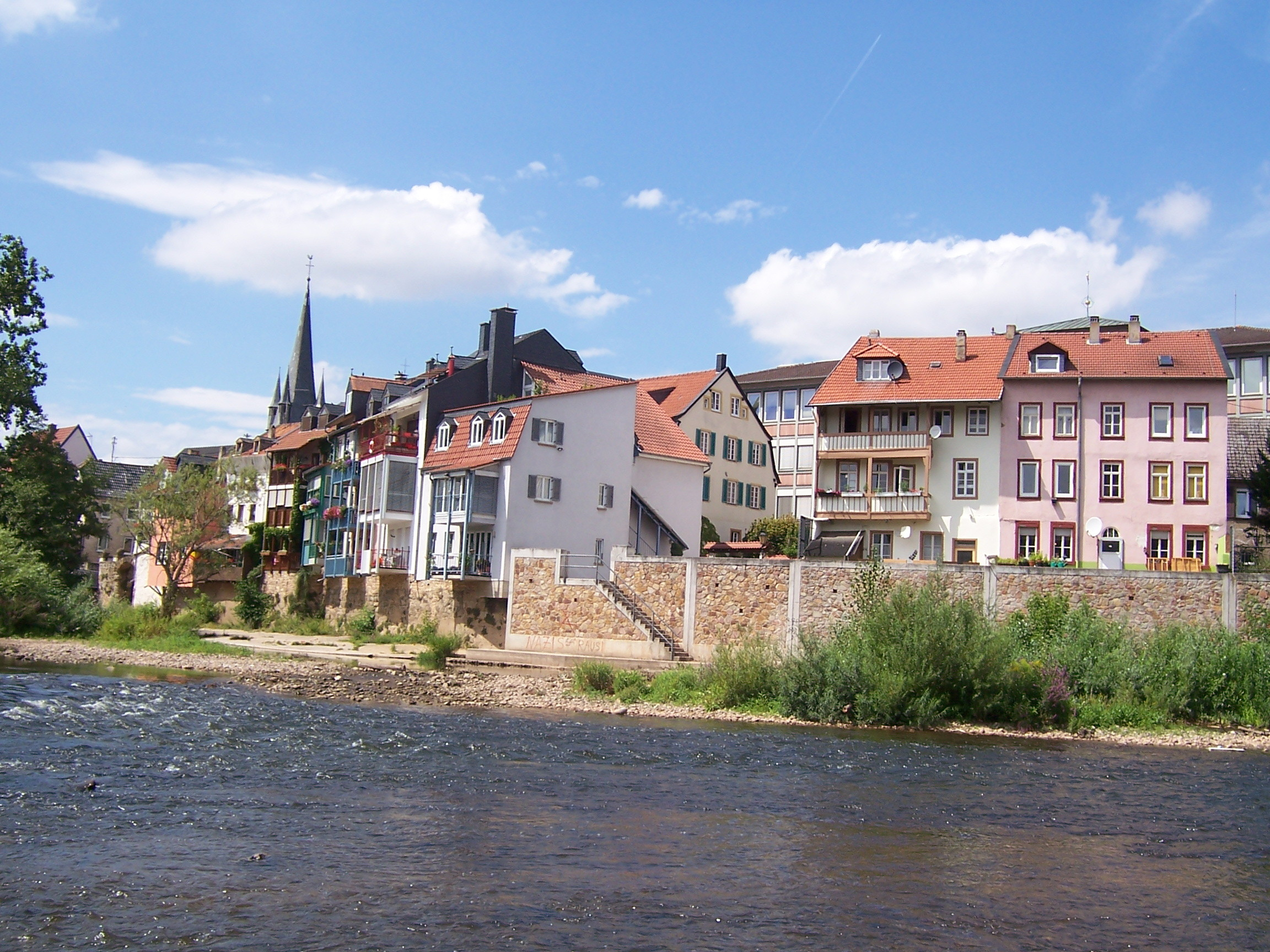
New Town monumental zone; left: "Little Venice"; in the background the tower of the Nikolauskirche

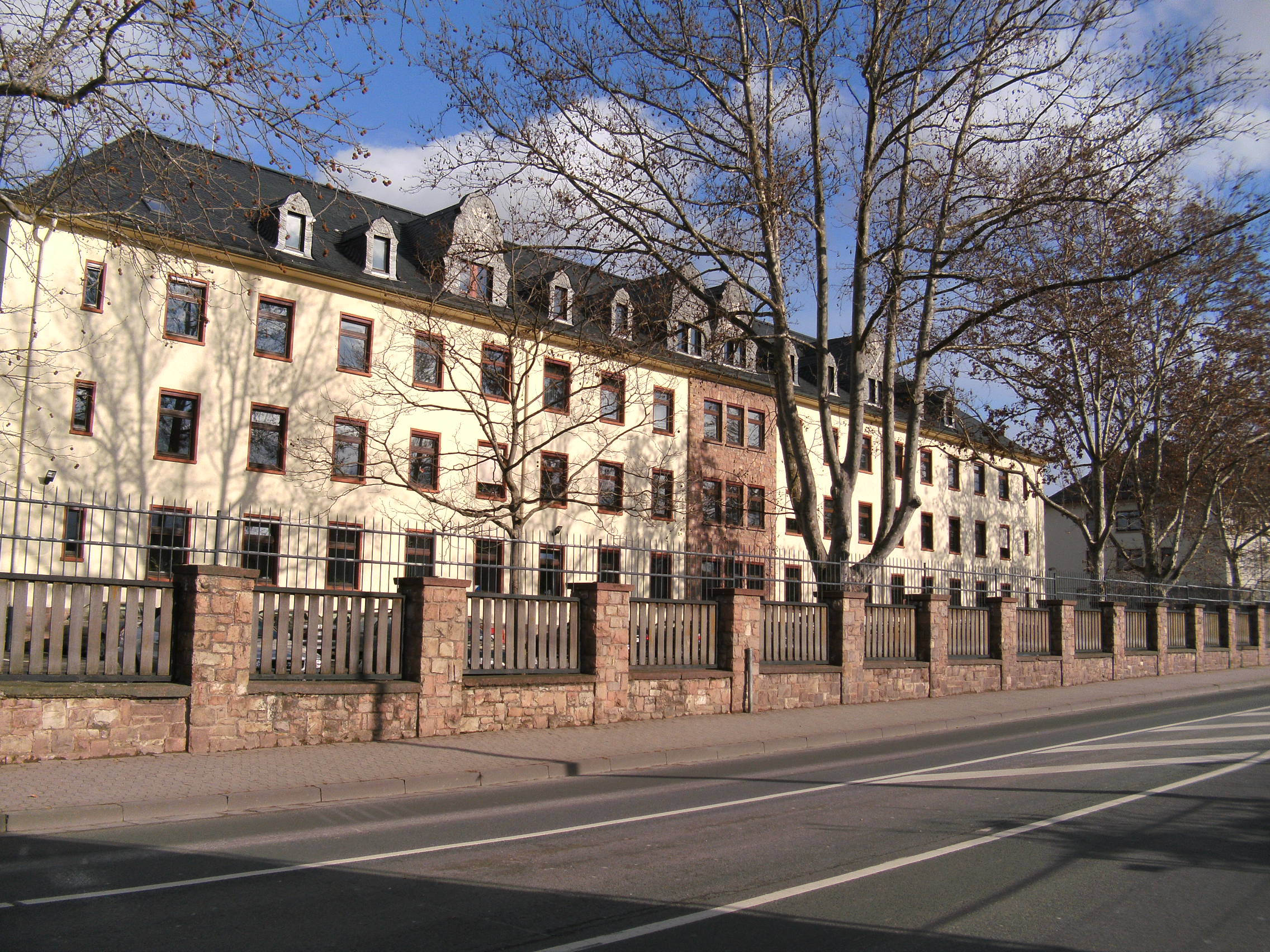
Barracks (Alzeyer Straße, 2009)

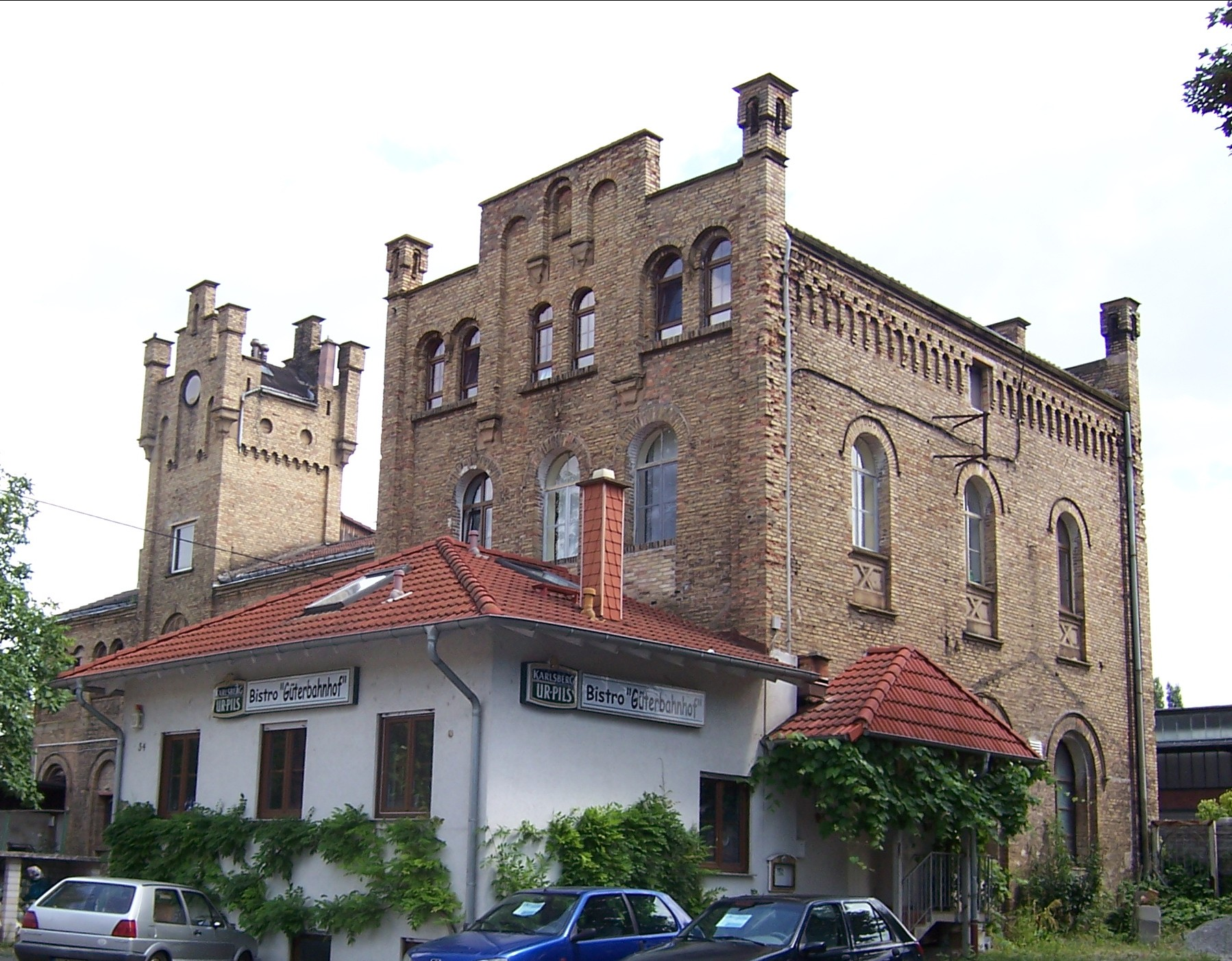
Brückes 54 – former main railway station

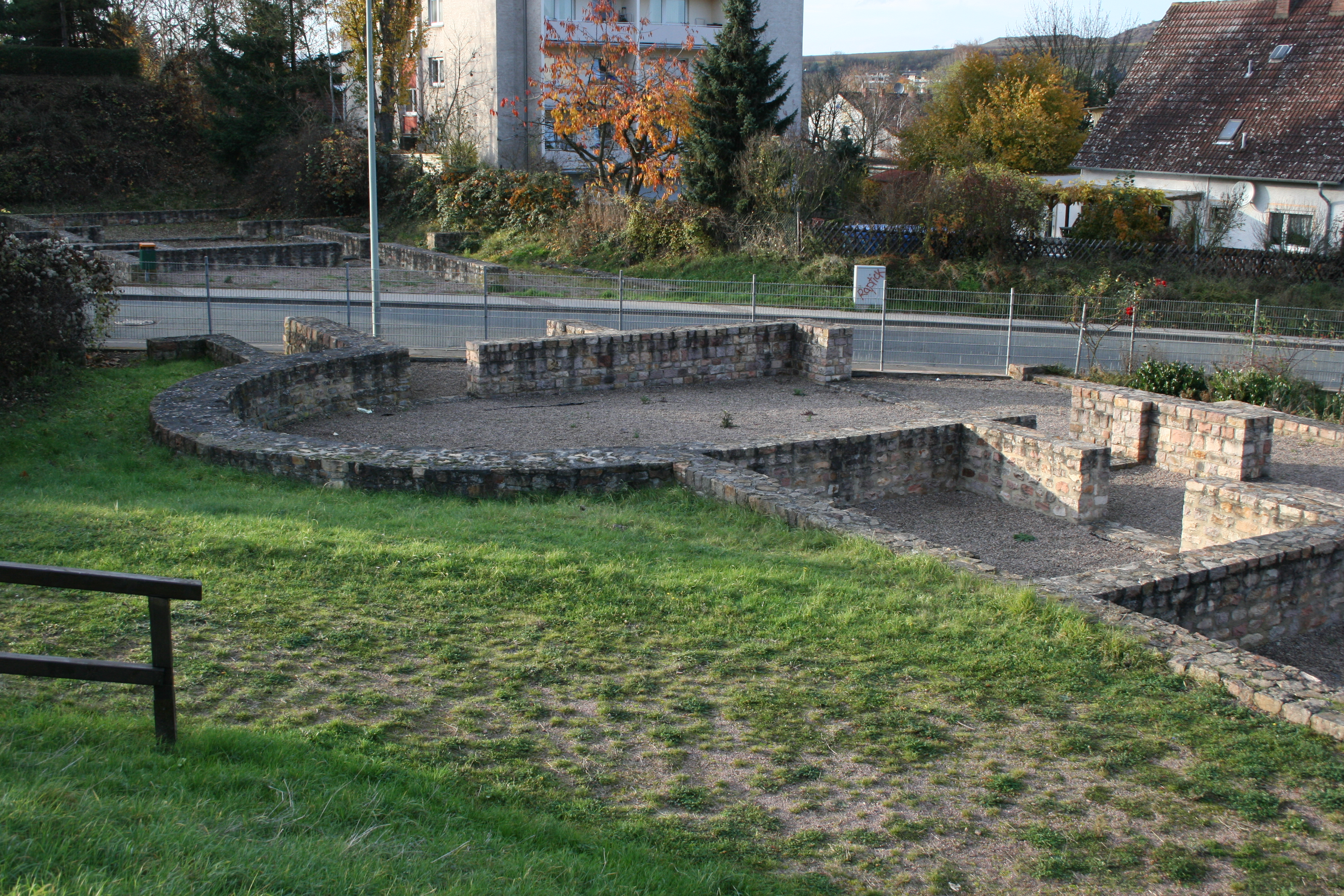
Schlosspark Museum-Roman villa monumental zone

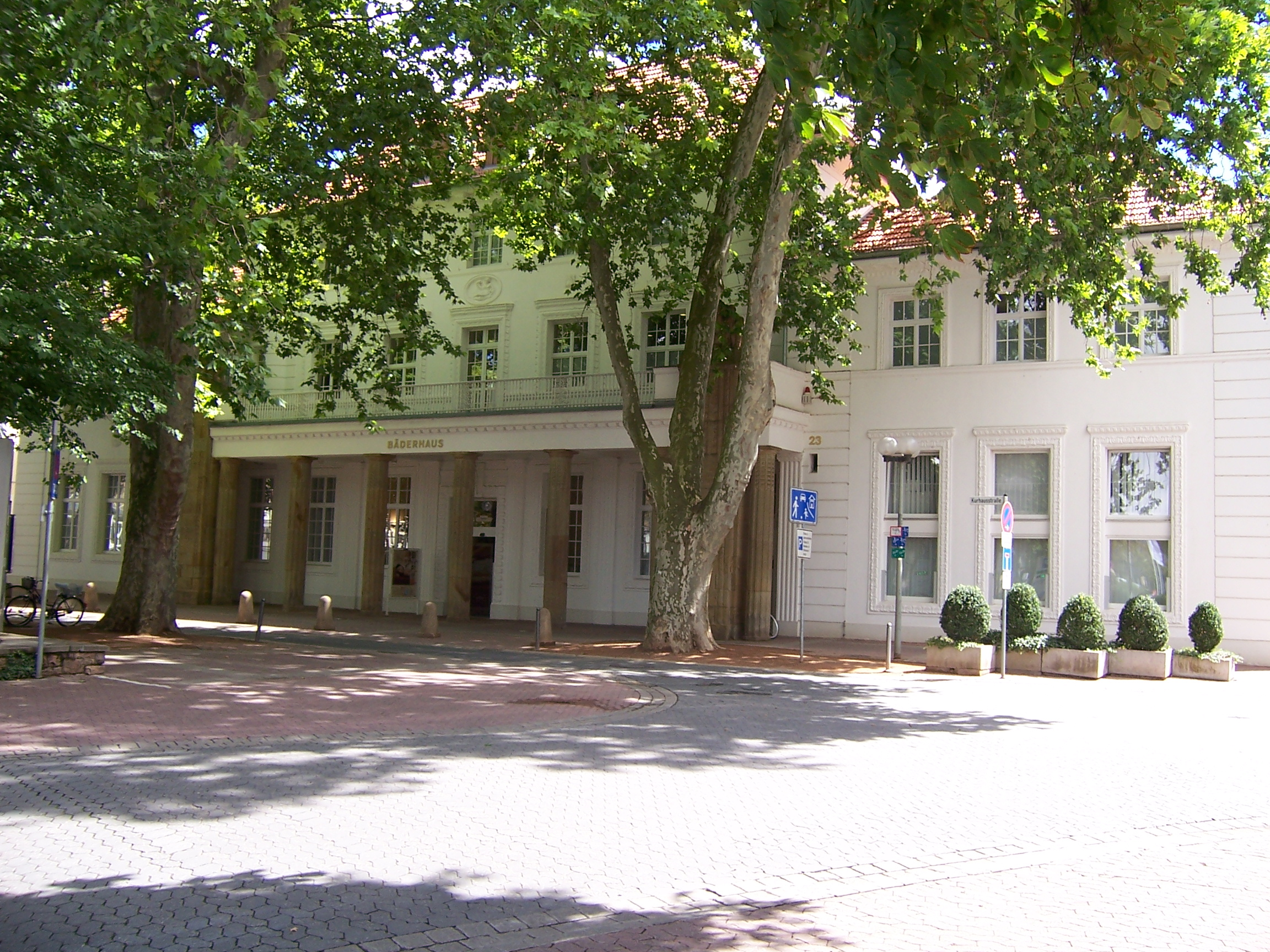
Kurhausstraße 23 – bathhouse

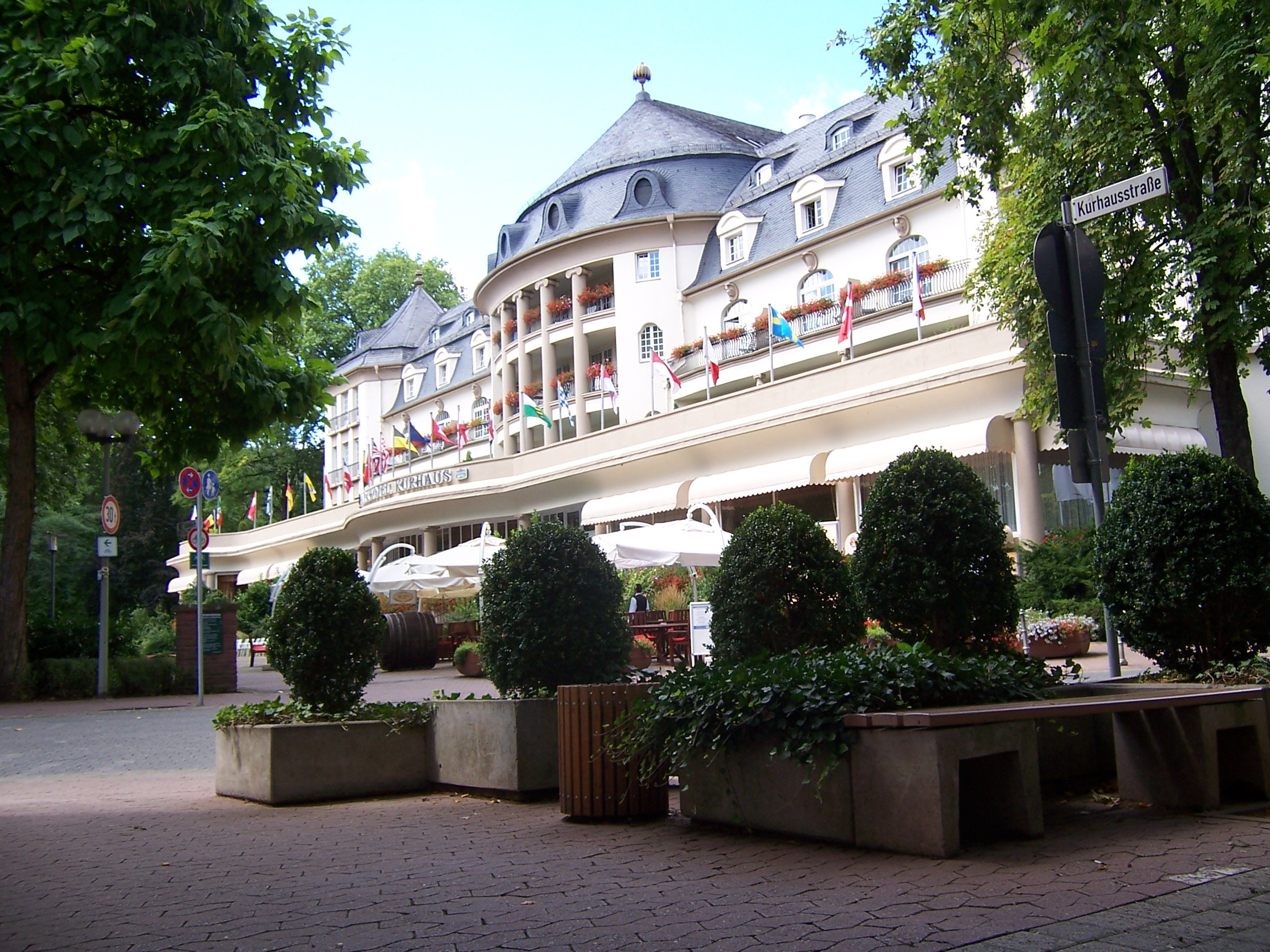
Kurhausstraße 28 – spa house

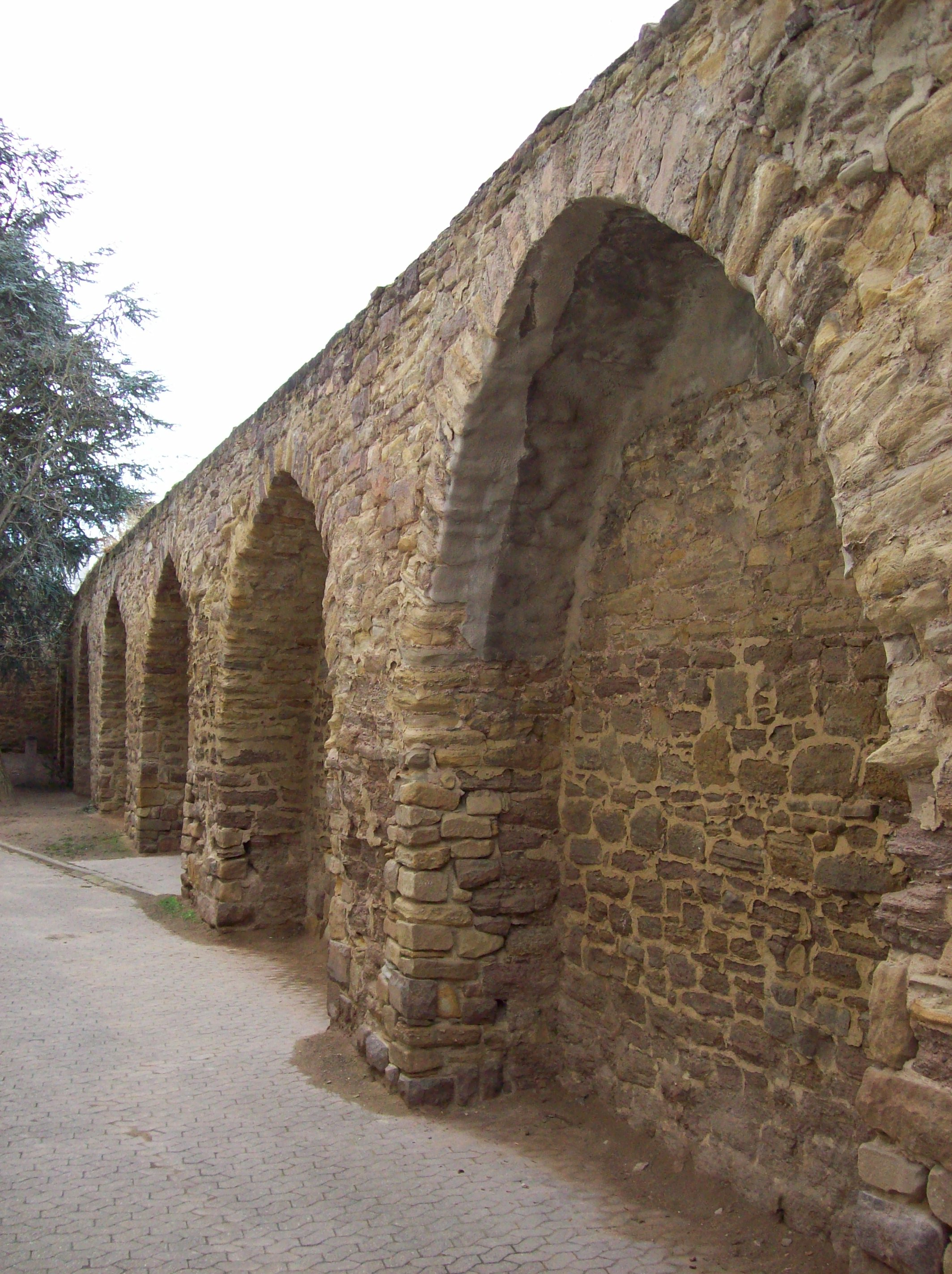
Hospitalgasse – town wall

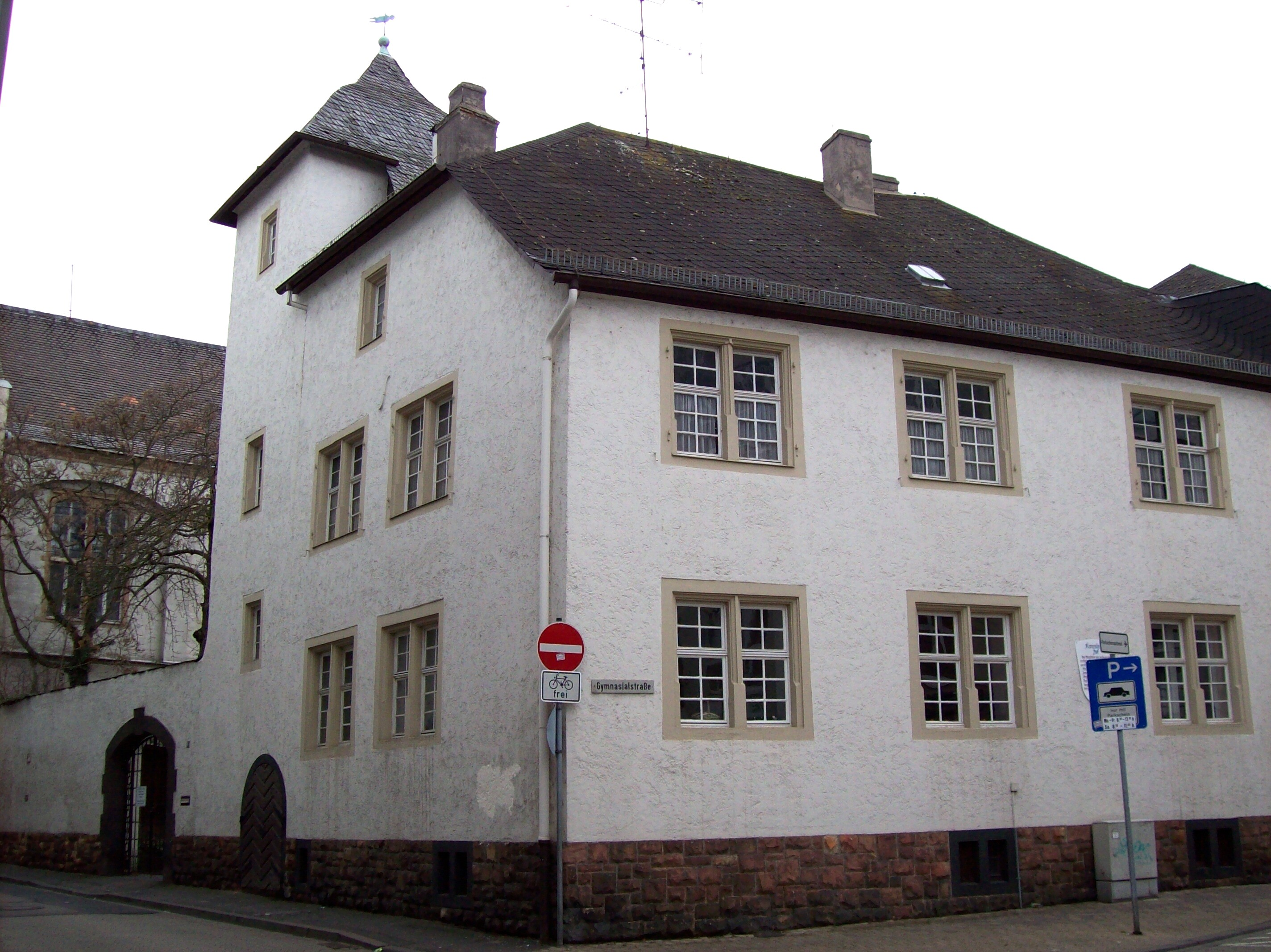
Hospitalgasse 4 and 6 – Kronberger Hof

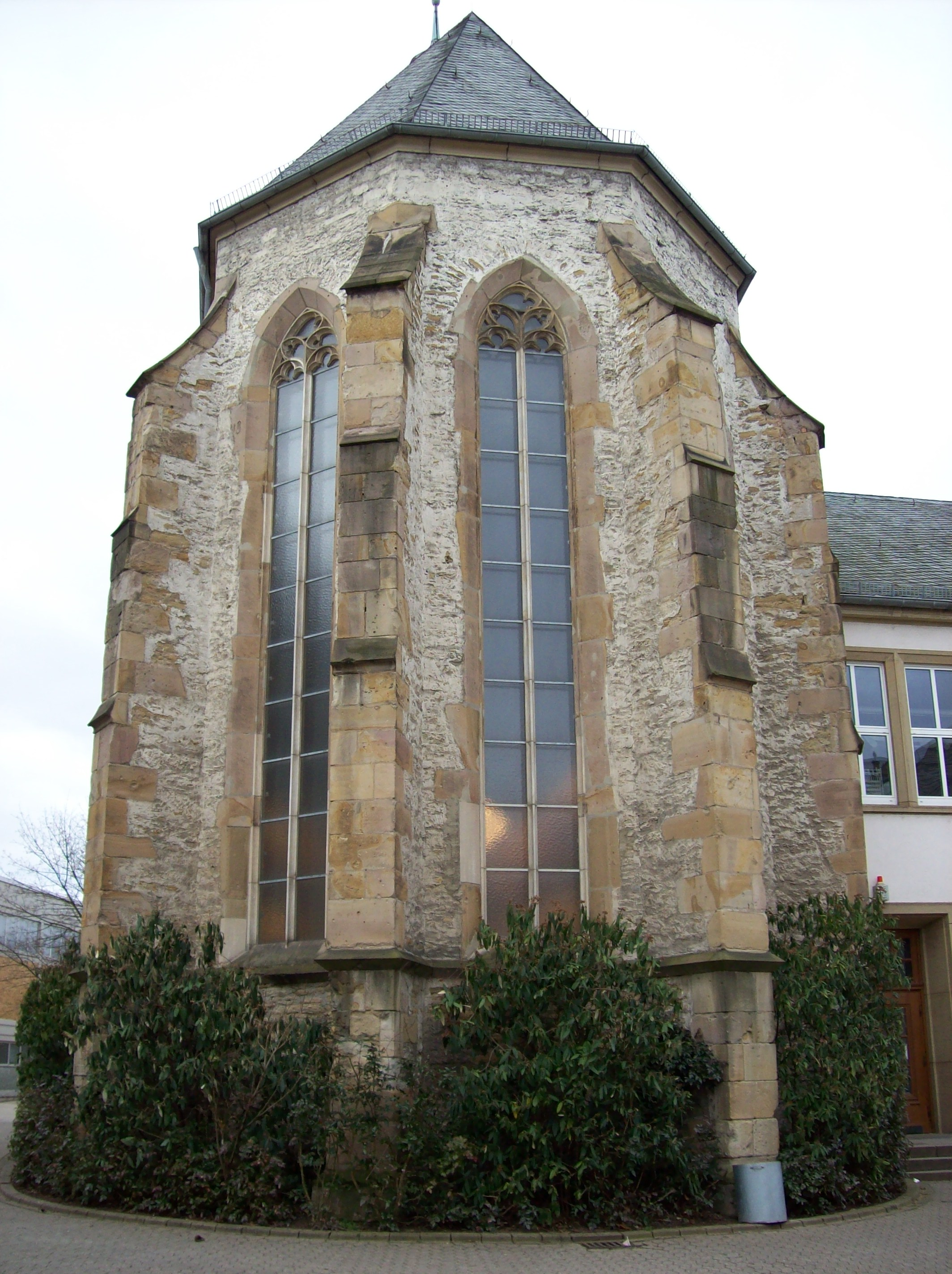
Hospitalgasse 6 – former Saint Wolfgang's Monastery Church

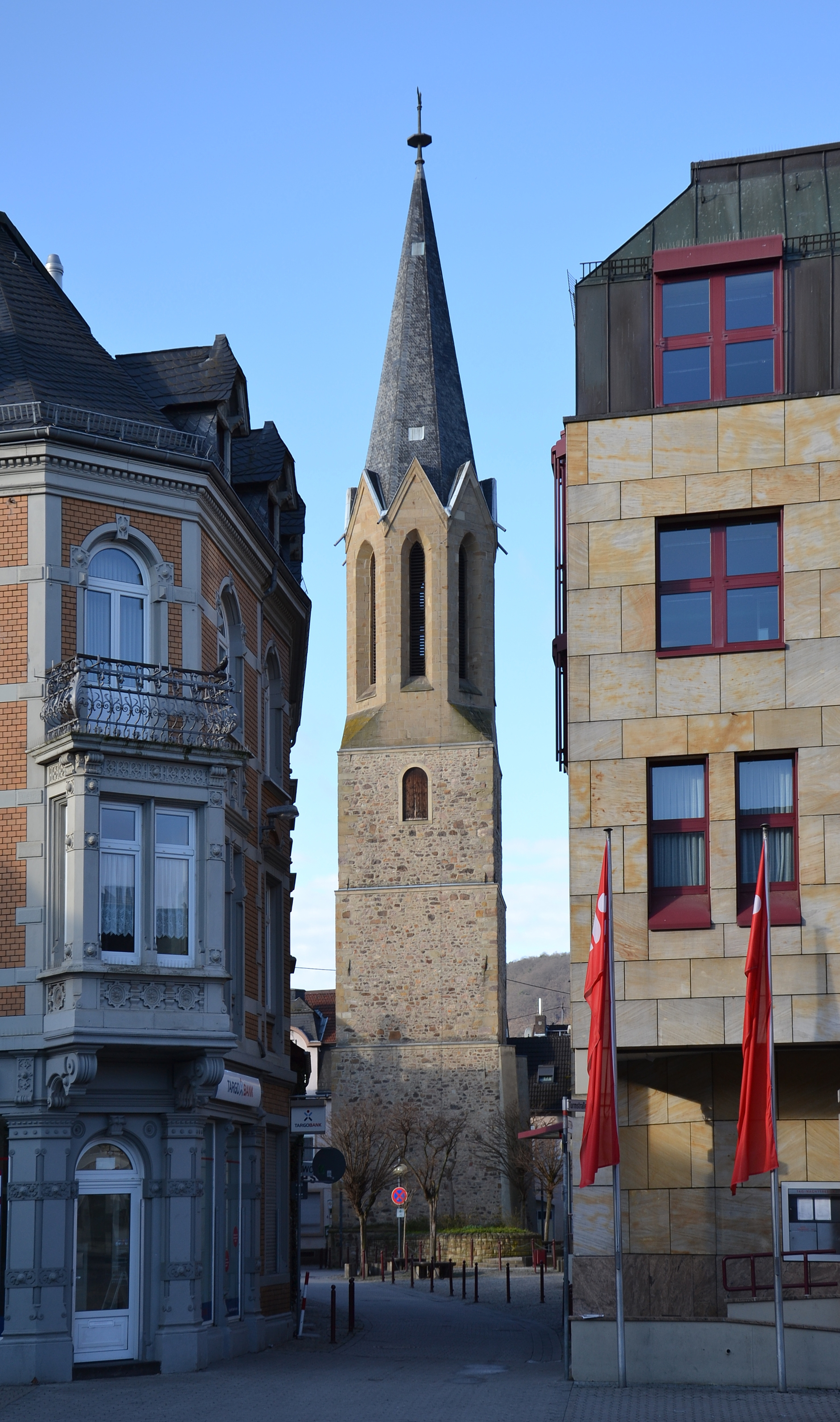
At Kornmarkt 5 – tower of the former Lutheran Wilhelmskirche

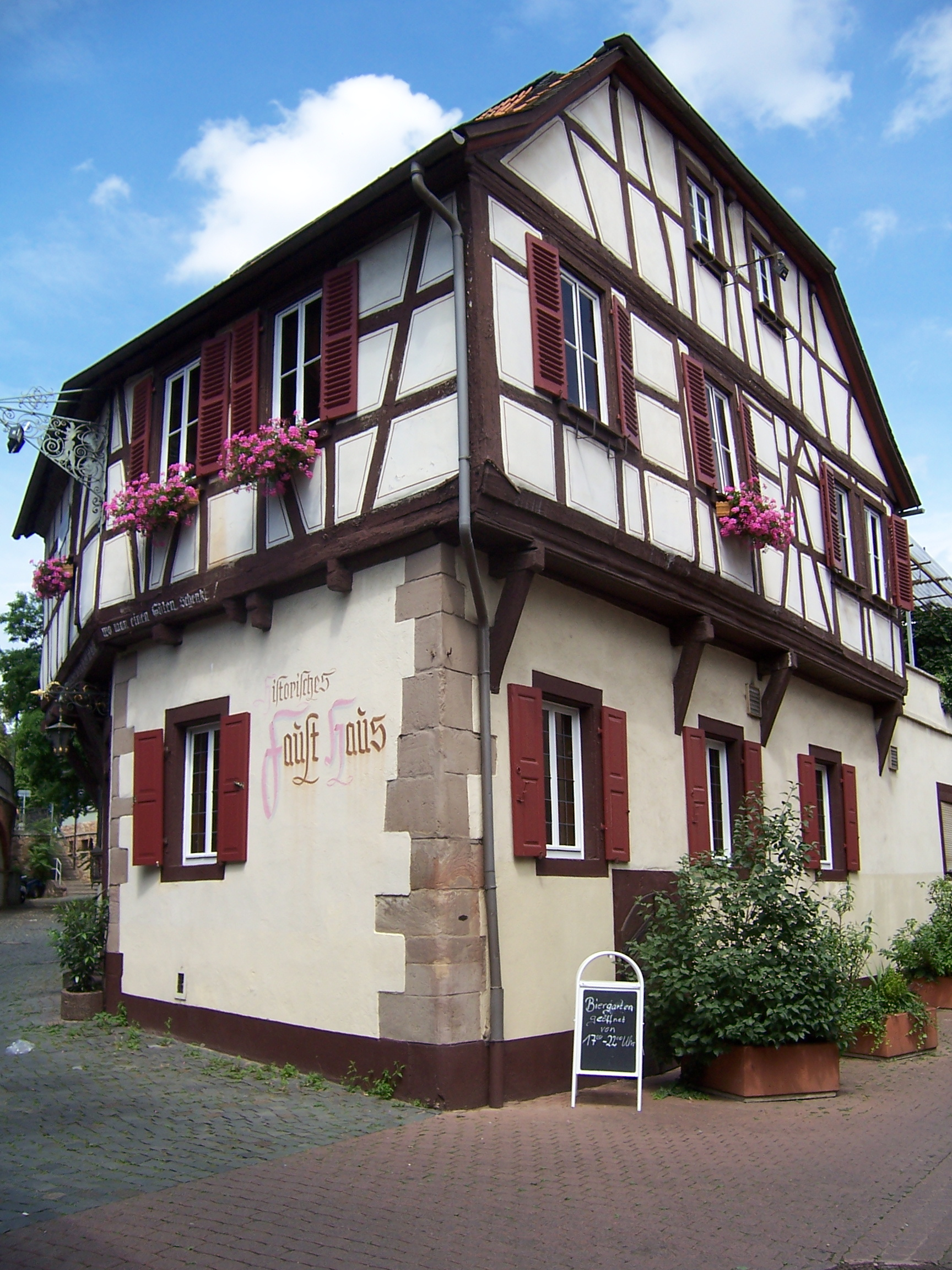
Magister-Faust-Gasse 47 – so-called Dr.-Faust-Haus

- Paul's Protestant Church (Pauluskirche), Kurhausstraße 2/4 – Late Gothic quire and transept, early 15th century, west façade after 1458, Classicist nave and tower 1768–1781, architect Philipp Heinrich Hellermann, Meisenheim; furnishings;
- Saint Wolfgang's Catholic Church (Kirche St. Wolfgang), in Breslauer Straße 2 – four colourfully made sculptures; Baroque Madonna, replica of the Late Gothic Saint Wolfgang figure in Sankt Wolfgang, Late Gothic Crucifix, Late Gothic Pietà;
- Holy Cross Catholic Parish Church (Pfarrkirche Heilig-Kreuz), Wilhelmstraße 39 – Gothic Revival hall church, red-sandstone-block building, 1895–1897, architect Ludwig Becker, Mainz; furnishings;
- Saint Nicholas's Catholic Parish Church (Pfarrkirche St. Nikolaus), Poststraße 5 – three-naved basilica, substantially from the 13th and 14th centuries, lengthened in the mid 15th century, 1713 partly Baroquified, 1897–1905 renovation resulting in some alterations with tower, architect Ludwig Becker, Mainz; furnishings; outside Late Baroque Crucifix, 1777;
- Kauzenburg, Auf dem Kauzenberg – preserved from the castle of the Counts of Sponheim founded after 1105 a few girding walls and vaulted cellar rooms; 1971 expansion into castle inn, architect Gottfried Böhm;
- Church of the American Pentecostal Community (Kirche der amerikanischen Pfingstgemeinde), built behind it, Viktoriastraße 18 – sandstone-framed plastered building, Baroquified gable risalto, 1909, architect Carl Jung, with municipal hall;
- Spa zone (monumental zone) – built after Dr. Eberhard Prieger's discovery of brine's healing power in 1817 according to systematic town planning in several phases in a spread-out pattern behind front gardens with avenues: Badeinsel ("Bathing Island") and northern spa zone up to Weinkauffstraße beginning in 1840 or 1847, area abutting to the south beginning in 1900, so-called expanded spa zone southeast of Salinenstraße beginning in 1880; many individual monuments such as the spa house (1840–1860), four-winged bathhouse (1911/1912), private bathhouses (Late Classicist and Renaissance Revival), especially monuments created by the sculptor family Cauer and bronze figures, saltworks (Karlshalle, Theodorshalle); in the south a jutting, pointed area bordered in the east by the railway line, in the north by Baumstraße/Salinenstraße/Schloßstraße, the millpond and the old bridge across the Nahe, in the west by a strip along the bank on the other side of the Nahe;
- New Town (Neustadt, monumental zone) – historically expanded development in the part of town founded after 1200 by the Counts of Sponheim north of the Nahe including the Ellerbach: late mediaeval Saint Nicholas's Church (St. Nikolauskirche), cellar and ground floor, partly also upper floors, with later upper floors added, former castle houses and nobles' houses from the 16th or 17th century as well as the town scrivener's office from 1540, timber-frame houses from the 18th century with Classicist and Renaissance Revival façades from the 19th century and Wilhelmsbrücke (bridge) in imitation of Historicist style with towers from 1906;
- Town fortifications – The town fortifications are made up of three complete wall systems around sovereign area (Burgfrieden), Neustadt ("New Town") and Altstadt ("Old Town") with outward ditches, wall towers and gate towers, first mentioned in 1247, destroyed in 1689, repaired in the 18th century, in late 18th century ditches filled in, beginning about 1840, walls torn down or integrated into new buildings; wall fragments preserved from the early-13th-century Kauzenburg (castle) destroyed in the 17th century; expansion in 1971 by Gottfried Böhm; preserved from the sovereign area (Burgfrieden): stepped wall as far as foundation of Klappertorturm (tower), piece of wall with later added half-round tower as far as Stumpfer Turm ("Stub Tower", also called Pfeffermühlchen, or "Little Peppermill") as well as the wall that partly forms the Nahe's bank, today partly overbuilt; preserved from the ringwall around the New Town with formerly seven towers and three gates: Butterfass ("Butterchurn") and piece of wall with battlement walkway, foundation remnants of the Winzenheimer Turm (tower), piece of wall of the Schanz ("Redoubt") with ditch, further remnants of the fortifications in the houses built up against them in the 19th century, a watergate (Fischerpforte, meaning "Fishermen's Gate") as well as the Große Pforte ("Great Gate", today walled up); preserved from the Old Town fortifications with formerly 13 towers, three gates and Peterspförtchen ("Peter's Little Gate"): wall remnants along the millpond, twin watergates (near Wilhelmstraße) and jutting part of the powder tower, at the Mehlwaage ("Flour Scales", but actually a house) an archlike structure built on as well as a great bit of wall in the garden of the former Franciscan monastery (now a Gymnasium);
- Agricolastraße 1 – lordly villa with hip roof, 1925/1926, architect Alexander Ackermann;
- Agricolastraße 6 – sophisticated cube-shaped villa with hip roof, Art Deco, 1925/1926, architect Alexander Ackermann;
- Agricolastraße 7 – villalike building with hip roof, 1921/1922, architect Vorbius;
- Albrechtstraße 18 – one-floor villa with timber-frame gables, Renaissance Revival motifs, 1904/1905, architect Friedrich Metzger;
- Albrechtstraße 20 – villa with hipped mansard roof, Renaissance Revival and Baroque Revival motifs, 1901/1902, architect Friedrich Metzger;
- Albrechtstraße 22 – villa like house with mansard roof, Renaissance Revival and Baroque Revival motifs, 1902/1903, architect Friedrich Metzger;
- Alte Poststraße 2 – three-floor post-Baroque shophouse, partly timber-frame (plastered), possibly from the earlier half of the 19th century;
- At Alte Poststraße 4 – cartouche, marked 1797;
- Alte Poststraße 6 – corner house; Late Baroque house with (hipped) mansard roof; Baroquified window 1909, architect Anton Kullmann; cellar older;
- Alte Poststraße 7 – Late Baroque house, partly timber-frame (plastered), conversion 1839, architect Peter Engelmann; cellar possibly older;
- Alte Poststraße 8 – Late Baroque house, partly timber-frame (plastered or slated);
- Alte Poststraße 15 – former Volxheimer Burghaus; gabled house, ground floor from the 16th century, upper floor and gables in decorative timber framing about 1710;
- Alzeyer Straße – barracks symmetrically about a grassy yard, scattered building complex with representative three-floor Heimatstil buildings, 1932 and years following;
- Auf dem Martinsberg 1 (monumental zone) – "stewardship complex with office building" on an L-shaped footprint, 1899, architects Curjel & Moser, originally belonging to villa at Brückes 3, joining wing 1919;
- Auf dem Martinsberg 2 – lordly Gründerzeit villa, clinker brick building with hip roof, Renaissance Revival, 1884, architect Jacob Karst; oriel additions 1920s; one-floor brick side building with hip roof, 1888; front garden fencing dating from time of building;
- Auf dem Martinsberg 3/5 – pair of semi-detached houses; clinker brick building with three-floor side risalti, 1896/1897, architect Anton Kullmann;
- Baumgartenstraße 3 – two-and-a-half-floor tenement, brick building, Renaissance Revival motifs, 1894/1895, architect Heinrich Ruppert;
- Baumgartenstraße 39 – three-and-a-half-floor corner shophouse with oriel turret, Renaissance Revival and Art Nouveau motifs, 1906/1907, architects Brothers Lang;
- Baumgartenstraße 42 – house; sandstone-framed clinker brick building, hipped mansard roof, Renaissance Revival, 1898/1899, architect Hermann Herter;
- Baumgartenstraße 46/48 – pair of semi-detached houses; clinker brick building with hipped mansard roof, Renaissance Revival, 1898, no. 46, architect Hermann Herter, no. 48, architects Brothers Lang;
- Baumgartenstraße 50 – two-and-a-half-floor house, brick building decorated with clinker brick, 1896/1897, architects Brothers Lang;
- Baumstraße 15 – two-and-a-half-floor villa; clinker-brick-faced building with hip roof, Renaissance Revival, 1880/1881, architect Town Master Builder Hartmann (?); one-floor front wing, 1934, architect Karl Heep;
- Beinde 18 – corner house; two essentially 18th-century Late Baroque plastered timber-frame houses, conversion and hip roof 1907, architect L. Zimmer;
- At Beinde 20 – portal with skylight, Late Baroque, marked 1782;
- Bleichstraße 18/20 – axially symmetrical pair of semi-detached shophouses; two-tone clinker brick building, 1899/1900;
- Bleichstraße 23 – sophisticated sandstone-framed clinker brick building with hip roof, Renaissance Revival, 1896/1897, architects Brothers Lang;
- Bleichstraße 25 – sandstone-framed brick building with hipped mansard roof, 1896/1897, architect August Henke;
- Bleichstraße 26 – two-and-a-half-floor corner shophouse; sandstone-framed clinker brick building with tower oriel and hip roof, Renaissance Revival, 1892, architect Martin Hassinger;
- Bosenheimer Straße 79 – house and factory building, decorative clinker brick building with half-hip roof, Renaissance Revival, marked 1899/1900, architect Johann Stanger; factory: spacious brick building;
- Bosenheimer Straße 200, Rolandsbogen(monumental zone) – urban residential development; flat-roof buildings grouped around an inner yard, 1927/1928, architect Town Building Councillor Hugo Völker;
- Brückes 1 – former casino; Classicist building with hip roof with triaxial gable risalto, 1834 and years following, architect Ludwig Behr;
- Brückes 3 – lordly Gründerzeit villa with hip roof, Renaissance Revival, shortly before 1876;
- Brückes 5 – upper-middle-class, partly three-floor Gründerzeit villa with hip roof, Renaissance Revival, about 1870;
- Brückes 12 – sophisticated three-floor house, Classicist motifs, about 1840;
- Brückes 14 – two-and-a-half-floor house, about 1840;
- Brückes 16 – lordly Gründerzeit villa with hipped mansard roof, Renaissance Revival, 1882, architect Jacob Karst;
- Brückes 18 – lordly Gründerzeit villa, two-and-a-half-floor building with hip roof, 1877/1878, architect Ludwig Bohnstedt;
- Brückes 20 – spacious three-floor building with hip roof, about 1840; side building dating from the same time;
- Brückes 21 – former lordly winegrowing estate, house and sparkling wine factory; one-and-a-half-floor Classicist complex with hip roofs, about 1860; spacious cellar addition on an L-shaped footprint, 1877, architects Schaeffer and Bechthold; stone cellar, 1887, architect Jacob Kossmann;
- Brückes 22 – two-and-a-half-floor Classicist house, 1880/1881;
- Brückes 24 – house, Romanesquified motifs, about 1850;
- Brückes 27 – storage and dwelling house; one-and-a-half-floor Classicist building with hipped mansard roof, about 1879;
- Brückes 33 – former Potthoff & Söhne winegrowing estate; representative villalike building with hip roof, Renaissance Revival, about 1860, front wing with Renaissance Revival motifs, 1909, architect Anton Kullmann; wing, about 1860; southern estate building, 1888, architect Jacob Karst;
- Brückes 41 – Anheuser & Fehrs winegrowing estate; residencelike shophouse; three-wing complex in stone-block wallwork, Heimatstil, 1930s, reconstruction 1948/1949, architect Theo Wilkens;
- Brückes 53 – Economic Adviser August E. Anheuser winegrowing estate; one-floor sandstone-framed quarrystone building, about 1860, Gothicized motifs, expansion 1955, architect Theo Wilkens; vaulted cellar 1894, hall built over it in 1953;
- Brückes 54 – former main railway station; two-wing castlelike red clinker brick building, Romanesquified motifs, 1860;
- Brückes 60 – house resembling a country house; two-and-a-half-floor brick building, partly timber-frame, hip roof, 1902 architect possibly Franz Collein;
- Brückes 63a – Gründerzeit house; three-floor clinker brick building with hipped mansard roof, Renaissance Revival motifs;
- Bühler Weg 3 – bungalow with high mansard floor, 1925/1926, architect Peter Riedle; characterises the street's appearance;
- Bühler Weg 5 – villalike house with tented roof, 1927/1928, architect Martin Au;
- Bühler Weg 8 – villalike corner house, 1927/1928, architect Martin Au;
- Bühler Weg 12 – villalike corner house with hip roof, 1927, architect Martin Au;
- Cauerstraße 1 – lordly villa, Renaissance Revival and Art Nouveau motifs, 1902/1903, architect Hans Best;
- Cauerstraße 3 – villa with hip roof, corner tower with pointed roof, 1925/1926, architect Alexander Ackermann;
- Cecilienhöhe 3 – Viktoriastift, 1913–1916, architect Hans Best; "Cecilienhaus", four-floor plastered building on almost T-shaped footprint, hip roofs, Neoclassical motifs; built behind it, four-floor wing with three-floor part in front, floor added in 1925, hip roof with lookout tower; mother-and-child group by Ludwig Cauer;
- Dessauer Straße, Hüffelsheimer Straße, Schlosspark Museum-Roman villa(monumental zone) – remnants of the Roman palatial villa, Puricelli-Schloss (Dessauer Straße 49 and 51) with park and former estate (Hüffelsheimer Straße 1,3,5);
- Dessauerstraße 1a – three-floor terraced house; Late Historicist brick building with mansard roof, about 1900;
- Dessauerstraße 2 – Classicist pair of semi-detached houses, about 1850; four-floor plastered stone-block or porphyry building and slightly newer porphyry building with display windows from 1896;
- Dessauerstraße 6 – lordly villa with knee wall, Renaissance Revival motifs, about 1870;
- Dessauerstraße 7 – house; sandstone-framed brick building, about 1870;
- Dessauerstraße 9 – former wine cellar; one-floor brick building with barge-rafter gable, 1891 (?);
- Dessauerstraße 31 – former tanner's house; partly timber-frame, about 1820;
- Dessauerstraße 41 – Gründerzeit villa; two-and-a-half-floor building with hip roof, Renaissance Revival, about 1870, polygonal oriel window 1891;
- Dessauerstraße 43 – Neoclassical villa, cube-shaped building with hip roof, about 1870; behind it, a brick building, 1883, architect Friedrich Metzger;
- Dessauerstraße 49 and 51 – former Puricelli-Schloss; two-and-a-half-floor Classicist building with hip roof, 1772/1773, conversion after 1803, expansion 1861, built behind it, two-floor winged addition 1881; in the park, converted into a landscaped English garden in the 1890s, tomb of the Baroness of Gemmingen, 1820; end wall and gate, marked 1906; gatekeeper's house, one-and-a-half-floor clinker brick building, about 1906;
- Dr.-Alfons-Gamp-Straße 1 – rheumatism clinic; four-floor building typical of the time with hip roof with rounded side risalti, 1956/1957;
- At Dr.-Alfons-Gamp-Straße 1 – former Freemasons' Lodge; villalike plastered building with two-floor "bell roof", 1925, architect Willibald Hamburger;
- Dr.-Geisenheyner-Straße 3 – villalike house; cube-shaped tented-roof building, 1927, architect Peter Riedle, Rüdesheim;
- Dr.-Karl-Aschoff-Straße 6 – former inn and bathhouse; sophisticated two-wing building with hip roof and knee wall, 1850/1864;
- Dr.-Karl-Aschoff-Straße 7 – two-and-a-half-floor house, sandstone-framed porphyry building, 1850/1859;
- Dr.-Karl-Aschoff-Straße 8 – elegant house; cube-shaped building with hip roof, Classicist motifs, about 1870; addition 1889;
- Dr.-Karl-Aschoff-Straße 10 – Gründerzeit villa; brick building with hip roof, Renaissance Revival motifs, 1889, architects Brothers Lang;
- Dr.-Karl-Aschoff-Straße 12/14 – pair of semi-detached houses; sandstone-framed brick building with mansard roof, Renaissance Revival motifs, 1890/1891, architects Brothers Lang;
- Dr.-Karl-Aschoff-Straße 13 – villalike corner house and bathhouse; two-and-a-half-floor porphyry building with hip roof, one-floor addition with hip roof, 1850/1859;
- Dr.-Karl-Aschoff-Straße 24 – house with bell-shaped spire light, Renaissance Revival motifs, marked 1900;
- Dr.-Karl-Aschoff-Straße 28 – villa; Neoclassical building with hip roof, 1870;
- Dr.-Karl-Aschoff-Straße 28a/28b – pair of semi-detached villas; Historicized quarrystone, timber-frame and plastered building, 1902/1903, architects August Henke & Sohn;
- Dr.-Karl-Aschoff-Straße 30 – villa with hip roof, about 1870, bay window 1895;
- Dr.-Karl-Aschoff-Straße 32, Oranienstraße 5 – pair of semi-detached houses; spacious building with hip roof and knee wall, imitation-ancient and Classicist motifs, 1873/1874, architect Jacob Lang; characterises street's appearance;
- Eichstraße 6 – two-and-a-half-floor house; brick building, Renaissance Revival motifs, 1893/1894, architect August Henke;
- Eiermarkt 1 – four-floor shophouse; Classicist plastered building, partly timber-frame, 1873/1874, architect August Henke, with older parts, cellar possibly about 1500;
- Eiermarkt 2 – three-floor shophouse; Classicistically framed plastered building, 1887, architect Jacob Kossmann, timber-frame upper floors possibly from the 18th century; cellar about 1500 (?);
- Eiermarkt 3 – three-floor house; timber-frame building (plastered), after 1689, built behind it, wooden bridge to the next house;
- Eiermarkt 4 – three-floor corner house; timber-frame building (plastered) with mansard roof, after 1689, makeover in the 19th century; two older cellars (about 1500 ?);

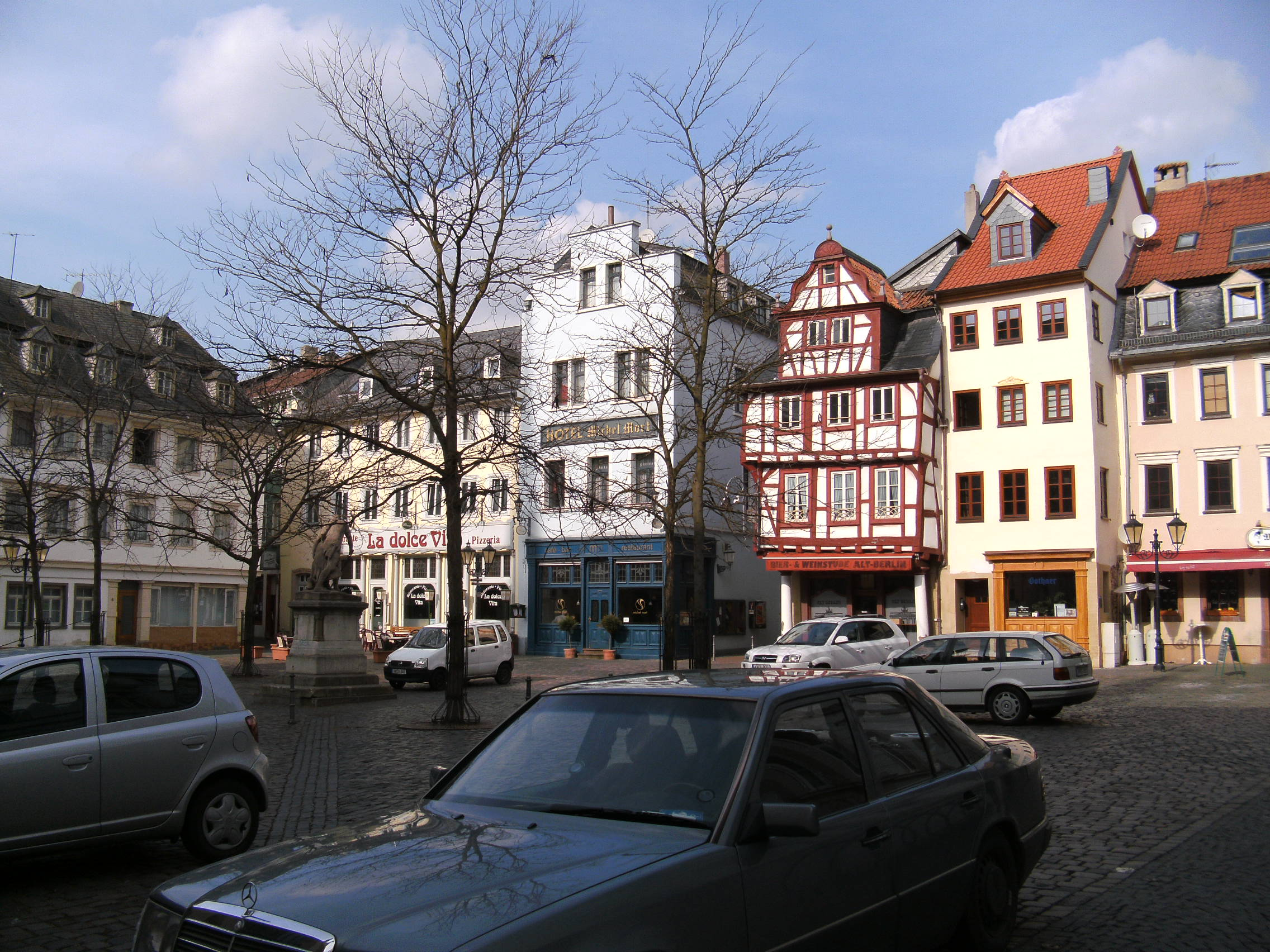
Eiermarkt 8–11 (from left)

- Eiermarkt 8 – three-floor shophouse; plastered building, possibly from the 18th century; two cellars before 1689;
- Eiermarkt 10 – three-floor shophouse; Late Renaissance building, partly timber-frame (plastered); cellar about 1500(?);
- Eiermarkt 10a – four-floor shophouse; essentially Baroque, partial makeover in 1888, architect Jacob Kossmann;
- Eiermarkt 11 – three-floor shophouse with mansard roof, 18th century, Classicist makeover in the 19th century;
- Eiermarkt 12 – three-floor Baroque timber-frame house (plastered), partial makeover in the 19th century;
- Eiermarkt 13 – three-floor corner house; imposing porphyry building, shortly after 1849, architect Johann Henke jun.; cellar about 1500(?);
- Eiermarkt 14 – lordly, villalike townhouse; three-floor cube-shaped building with hip roof, Renaissance Revival, 1862/1863, architect C. Conradi, conversion 1930/1931, architect Wilhelm Metzger; in the yard, a Renaissance gate;
- Forsthausweg 5 – spacious half-hip roof villa in corner location, 1926, architect Peter Riedle;
- Franziska-Puricelli-Straße 3 – St. Franziskastift ("Saint Frances's Foundation"); schloss-like Baroque Revival building, 1909, architects Brothers Friedhofen, Koblenz-Lützel;
- Freiherr-vom-Stein-Straße 3 – sophisticated villa; building with mansard roof on irregular footprint, Baroque and Renaissance Revival motifs, 1908/1909, architect Kaspar Bauer;
- Freiherr-vom-Stein-Straße 5 – villa resembling a country house; plastered building on quarrystone pedestal, Renaissance Revival motifs, 1907/1908, architect Hermann Karl Herter;
- Freiherr-vom-Stein-Straße 6 – villa resembling a country house; plastered building, partly timber-frame, 1907/1908, architect Hans Best;
- Freiherr-vom-Stein-Straße 7 – villa resembling a country house; building with half-hip roof, 1912/1913, architect Jean Rheinstädter;
- Freiherr-vom-Stein-Straße 9/11 – pair of semi-detached villas resembling country houses with odd-shaped roofscape, Renaissance Revival motifs, 1904/1905, architect Kaspar Bauer;
- Friedrichstraße 4 – lordly villa on irregular footprint with hip and mansard roofs, Baroque Revival under Art Nouveau influence, 1903/1904, architect Jean Rheinstädter; terrace with balustrade, 1927, architect Hans Best;
- Friedrichstraße 5 – two-and-a-half-floor villa; cube-shaped building with hip roof, Renaissance Revival, about 1870;
- Friedrichstraße 6 – three-floor corner house, Renaissance Revival, about 1870;
- Friedrichstraße 8 – two-and-a-half-floor villa; cube-shaped building with hip roof, Classicist motifs, about 1870;
- Geibstraße 1 – so-called "Observatory" (Sternwarte); two- or three-floor villa; brick-framed cube-shaped plastered building, New Objectivity;
- Gerbergasse 3 – three-floor corner house, Gründerzeit clinker brick building, 1885/1886, architect Josef Pfeiffer;
- Gerbergasse 5 – three-floor corner shophouse, Gründerzeit clinker brick building with hipped mansard roof, 1885/1886, architect Josef Pfeiffer;
- Gerbergasse 19 – Gründerzeit sandstone-framed house with knee wall, partly brick-clad, marked 1889;
- Gerbergasse 30 – timber-frame house, partly plastered, 18th century (?);
- Göbenstraße 4/4a – three-and-a-half-floor terraced houses, Renaissance Revival and Art Nouveau motifs, 1904/1905, Architects Brothers Lang;
- Göbenstraße 6/6a – three-and-a-half-floor terraced houses, Renaissance Revival and Art Nouveau motifs, 1906, Architects Brothers Lang;
- Göbenstraße 8/10 – pair of semi-detached houses, three-part brick-framed plastered building, 1903, architect Peter Ziemer;
- Goethestraße 2 – villalike house, cube-shaped building with hip roof, 1927/1928, architect Peter Riedle;
- Goethestraße 4 – villalike house, one-and-a-half-floor plastered building with hip or mansard roof, 1925/1926, architect Martin Au;
- Goethestraße 5 – villalike house, one- and two-floor building with hip roof, 1925/1926, architect Martin Au;
- Goethestraße 7 – villalike house, plastered building with hip or mansard roof, 1925/1926, architect Rudolf Hassinger; front garden fencing from the time of building;
- Goethestraße 1–7, 9, Bühler Weg 8, 10, 12, Röntgenstraße 2/4, 6, 8, Pestalozzistraße 3–9, Waldemarstraße 21, 23, 25, 27 (monumental zone)– villalike Historicized plastered buildings, mainly with hip roofs, some with mansard roofs, part of the town expansion at the Kuhberg out from the town centre in the 1920s;
- Graf-Siegfried-Straße 8 – villalike house, building with hip roof, 1920s, architect Martin Au;
- Gustav-Pfarrius-Straße 11–15 – Public Lina-Hilger-Gymnasium; two- and three-floor buildings arranged at right angles, between 1951 and 1975;
- Gustav-Pfarrius-Straße 31/33 – pair of semi-detached houses with hip roof, Art Deco ornamentation, 1926, architect Engineer Düttermann;
- Gustav-Pfarrius-Straße 35/37 – pairs of semi-detached houses, Historicized and Art Deco motifs, 1927, architect Richard Starig;
- Gustav-Pfarrius-Straße 42/44, Steinkaut 1/2 – differentiated, individually shaped housing development with hip roofs, Renaissance Revival and Art Deco motifs, 1926, architect Jean Rheinstädter;
- Gustav-Pfarrius-Straße/Lina-Hilger-Straße, Gustav-Pfarrius-Straße 1/3, 5, 7, Lina-Hilgerstraße 1, 3/5 and Bosenheimer Straße 6 and 8 (monumental zone) – five artificial-stone-framed buildings with hip roofs, 1925/1926, architect Johann Au, built as dwellings for junior officers;
- Gustav-Pfarrius-Straße 14, 16/18, 20/22, 24/26, 28 (monumental zone) – sophisticated residential buildings, three-floor buildings with hip roofs with two-floor lobbies, 1926/1927, architect Hugo Völker, based on plans from 1919, architect Alexander Ackermann;
- Gustav-Pfarrius-Straße 14–30 (even numbers), 17–37 (odd numbers), Ringstraße 102–110 (even numbers), Jean-Winckler-Straße 2–20 (even numbers), Röntgenstraße 20–24 (even numbers), 25–35 (odd numbers) (monumental zone) – various apartment blocks as well as detached and semi-detached villas in Historicized 1920s style with Heimatstil, Baroque Revival and Neoclassical motifs, substantially from 1925/1926;
- Gut Neuhof – three-sided estate; house, building with half-hip roof, about 1800, right-angled addition, 1905, further right-angled addition over late mediaeval (?) cellars, commercial building from the mid 19th and early 20th centuries;
- Güterbahnhofstraße 6 – house, Renaissance Revival motifs, about 1860, one-floor side building;
- Güterbahnhofstraße 7 – house, Renaissance Revival motifs, about 1900;
- Güterbahnhofstraße 9 – sophisticated two-and-a-half-floor house, Renaissance Revival motifs, about 1860, spacious side building
- Gymnasialstraße 11 – three-floor house, Late Classicist building with hip roof, 1856;
- Heinrichstraße 3 – sophisticated house, clinker brick building with hip roof, Renaissance Revival and Baroque Revival motifs, 1898/1899, architect Friedrich Metzger;
- Heinrichstraße 5 – lordly villa, brick building, Renaissance Revival, 1895/1896, architect Jean Rheinstädter;
- Heinrichstraße 7/9 – pair of semi-detached villas resembling country houses, Historicized motifs, 1907/1908, architect Friedrich Metzger;
- Heinrichstraße 11/11a – representative pair of semi-detached villas resembling country houses, 1908/1909, architect Friedrich Metzger;
- Helenenstraße 5 – sophisticated clinker brick building with hipped mansard roof, Renaissance Revival motifs, 1898/1899, architect Jacob Kossmann;
- Helenenstraße 7 – villalike house, Renaissance Revival and Art Nouveau motifs, 1903/1904, architect Heinrich Müller;
- Helenenstraße 8 – villalike house, cube-shaped brick building with hipped mansard roof, Renaissance Revival motifs, 1904/1905, architect Heinrich Müller;
- Helenenstraße 9/11 – pair of semi-detached houses with hipped mansard roof, Renaissance Revival and Art Nouveau motifs, 1906, architect Heinrich Müller;
- Helenenstraße 10 – house, Renaissance Revival and Art Nouveau motifs, 1905/1906, architect Heinrich Müller;
- Helenenstraße 12 – corner house with hip roof resembling a country house, Renaissance Revival motifs, 1906/1907, architect Heinrich Müller;
- Herlesweiden 1–14, Birkenweg 1–27 (odd numbers), Erlenweg 2, 4, 6, 7–14, Ulenweg 1–16, Alzeyer Straße 108–138 (even numbers), Pfalzstraße 13–35 (odd numbers), Rheinstraße 38, 38a, 40–46 (even numbers) (monumental zone) – buildings, alike in shape but with varying dimensions, with hip roofs and front gardens, 1928/1929, architect Paul Gans, on the northwest corner the more sophisticated, slightly earlier built houses Rheinstraße 102 and Birkenweg 1;
- Hochstraße 9 – former Hotel Adler; ten-axis four-floor building with hip roof, third quarter of the 19th century, Late Classicist façade partly altered (shop built in);
- Hochstraße 17 – three-floor corner house, post-Baroque building with hipped mansard roof, early 19th century;
- Hochstraße 22a – three-floor shophouse, early 19th century; cellar older (no later than 16th century);
- Hochstraße 25 – three-winged complex with hip roofs, middle building late 18th century, side wings early 19th century; Baroque portal of the former Lutheran church, 1632;
- Hochstraße 30/32 – "Gasthaus zum grünen Kranz" ("Inn at the Green Wreath"); U-shaped complex; no. 30, partly timber-frame, marked 1601, no. 32, partly timber-frame, 19th century, joining wing early 20th century;
- Hochstraße 34 – three-floor house, partly timber-frame (plastered), 18th or early 19th century;
- Hochstraße 36 – "Stadt Koblenz" ("City of Koblenz") Inn; three-floor sandstone-framed clinker brick building, 1902, architect Fritz Wagner;
- Hochstraße 42 – shophouse, Baroque building with hip roof, partly timber-frame, 1788;
- Hochstraße 44 – Baroque shophouse, partly timber-frame, left half marked 1668, right half from the 18th century;
- At Hochstraße 45 – armorial stone from the former House of Leyen estate, marked 1553;
- Hochstraße 46 – former Inn "Zur weißen Taube" ("At the White Dove"); three-floor shophouse with hip roof, ground floor partly before 1689, timber-frame upper floors (plastered) from the mid 18th century, open timber framing and loft 1902, architect Jacob Karst;
- Hochstraße 48/50, Fischergasse 10 – townhouse, former Hundheimer Hof; Late Baroque building with hipped mansard roof, 1715, Gründerzeit clinker brick addition about 1900, architect Friedrich Hartmann;
- Hochstraße/corner of Stromberger Straße – town wall "Schanz" ("Redoubt"); in the former casino garden, a 30 metre-long stretch of wall of the New Town fortification;
- Hofgartenstraße 1 – one- or two-and-a-half-floor house, brick building, Renaissance Revival motifs, 1889, Architects Brothers Lang;
- Hofgartenstraße 2 – two-and-a-half-floor villa with hip roof, Renaissance Revival, 1877, architect Schiffer;
- Hofgartenstraße 3 – villalike house, representative brick building with hip roof, 1900/1901, architect Johann Arthur Otte, Berlin;
- Hofgartenstraße 4 – Gründerzeit villa, richly ornamented brick building, Renaissance Revival, 1890/1891, architects Curjel & Moser, Karlsruhe; wine cellar building 1890/1891, architect Jacob Karst;
- Hofgartenstraße 5 – representative one- and two-floor villa, broadly mounted Baroquified building with hip roof, 1922, architect Hans Best, retaining wall at side of garden 18th century;
- Hofgartenstraße 14 – former municipal Realschule; sophisticated three-part clinker brick building with mansard roof, Renaissance Revival, 1894 and years following, architect Friedrich Hartmann, gymnasium and caretaker's house from time of building;
- Hofgartenstraße 22 – representative house in country house style, 1908/1909, architect Adolf Riekenberg, Darmstadt;
- Hofgartenstraße 32 – former "Klein-Kinder-Schule" (preschool); one-and-a-half-floor manorlike building with hipped mansard roof, 1905/1906, architect Hans Best;
- Hofgartenstraße 70 – former Hauptschule; representative, three- and four-floor clinker brick building with plastered surfaces, 1906, architect Friedrich Hartmann;
- Hofgartenstraße 74 – three-floor house, brick-framed plastered building, Renaissance Revival motifs, 1905/1906, architect Karl Keller;
- Hofgartenstraße 76 – house, brick-framed plastered building, Renaissance Revival motifs, 1904, architect Karl Keller;
- Hofgartenstraße 90 – imposing corner house, building with hip roof with oriel turret, 1907/1908, architect Anton Kullmann;
- Hospitalgasse – town wall; 75 metre-long stretch of wall of the Old Town fortification in the garden of what is now the Gymnasium;
- Hospitalgasse 4 and 6 – State Gymnasium and "Kronberger Hof"; four-wing complex of great dimensions; Gymnasium, north wing 1885, west wing 1912 and years following, extra floors after 1945; auditorium: Renaissance Revival, 1900/1901, architects Kallmeyer and J. Hensch; "Kronberger Hof", former castle house: building with half-hip roof, about 1600;
- Hospitalgasse 6 – former Saint Wolfgang's Monastery Church (Klosterkirche St. Wolfgang); Late Gothic quire, quarrystone, 1742; incorporated into new building at Gymnasium;
- Hüffelsheimer Straße 1, 3, 5 – former Puricelli landhold, so-called Gütchen ("Little Estate"); three-wing complex, main building Late Baroque building with mansard roof, wings possibly from the early 19th century; Gründerzeit doorman's cabin, 1900, Renaissance Revival gate complex; commercial and administrative building, sophisticated brick building, 1902; long, stately carriage shed with decorative timber framing, 1903; scales, brick building, about 1898; "Römerhalle" ("Romans' Hall"), 1898, architect Christian Hacke;
- Im Hasenbühl 14 – villalike house with hip roof, 1939, architect Jean Rheinstädter;
- Jahngasse 2 – castle house of the "Stumpfer Hof"; three-floor Baroque plastered building, partly timber-frame (plastered), 17th century (?); late mediaeval wall remnants;
- Jean-Winckler-Straße 4 – bungalow, wood-clad timber-frame building with mansard roof, 1924;
- Jean-Winckler-Straße 6 – bungalow, "Halbmassivhaus System Schwarz", 1924/1925;
- Jean-Winckler-Straße 8 – villalike house, 1925, architect Wilhelm Förster;
- Jean-Winckler-Straße 10/12 – three-part pair of semi-detached villalike houses, 1925/1926, architect Martin Au;
- Jean-Winckler-Straße 18 – house with hip roof, Art Deco motifs, 1926/1927, architect Martin Au;
- Jean-Winckler-Straße 20, Röntgenstraße 35 – pair of semi-detached houses with hip roof, Art Deco motifs, 1926/1927, architect Düttermann, Düsseldorf;
- Johannisstraße 8 – corner house with hip roof, Renaissance Revival motifs, 1896/1897, architect Rudolf Frey;
- Johannisstraße 9 – two-and-a-half-floor house, sandstone-framed plastered building, 1905/1906, architect Peter Monz;
- Jungstraße 6, 8, 10, 12, 14, 16 (monumental zone) – six three-floor tenements, clinker brick buildings, Renaissance Revival, 1893 and years following, Architects Brothers Lang; characterises street's appearance;
- Kaiser-Wilhelm-Straße 2 – sophisticated Late Classicist plastered building, possibly 1850, architect J. Müller;
- Kaiser-Wilhelm-Straße 4 – lordly villa with knee wall and hip roof, Renaissance Revival, 1860, architect C. Conradi;
- Kaiser-Wilhelm-Straße 7 – in town library's new building a bronze bust of Gustav Pfarrius, 1898 by Hugo Cauer; former garden pavilion, imitation-ancient columned hall, 1850/1860;
- Kaiser-Wilhelm-Straße 10 – three-floor shophouse with hip roof, Renaissance Revival, 1868/1869;
- Kaiser-Wilhelm-Straße 11b – three-floor terraced house with open front buildings, about 1860;
- Kaiser-Wilhelm-Straße 11 – retail pavilion at the edge of the spa park, early 20th century;
- Kaiser-Wilhelm-Straße 14 – former "Bade- und Logierhaus" ("Bathing and Lodging House"); three-and-a-half-floor Late Classicist building with hip roof, 1865 architect possibly Johann Pfeiffer;
- Kaiser-Wilhelm-Straße 18 – Gründerzeit villa with hip roof, 1899/1900, architect August Henke;
- Kaiser-Wilhelm-Straße 21 – former "Bade- und Logierhaus" ("Bathing and Lodging House"), three-floor house with knee wall and hip roof, imitation-ancient and Renaissance Revival motifs, 1865/1866, architect Ludwig Bohnstedt;
- Kaiser-Wilhelm-Straße 26 – villa with mansard roof, Late Classicist motifs, about 1870, veranda addition with stained glass windows from 1905;
- Kaiser-Wilhelm-Straße 28 – sophisticated villalike house with hip roof, rooftop terrace, 1877/1878, architect R. Wagener, staircase tower 1891;
- Kilianstraße 15 – Classicist corner house, 1875, architect Heinrich Ruppert;
- Kirschsteinanlage – watergate; town wall remnant with twin watergates of the Old Town fortifications and addition of the former Pulverturm ("Powder Tower");
- Klappergasse – Klappertorturm (gate tower); in the wall running parallel to the Nahe's bank, a pedestal remnant of the Klappertorturm of the town fortifications, wall fragment at the Kauzenberg (hill);
- Kornmarkt 2 – three-and-a-half-floor corner shophouse, three-window house, about 1865; cellar about 1600;
- (zu) Kornmarkt 5 – tower of the former Lutheran Wilhelmskirche (William's Church); quarrystone or sandstone-block wallwork, Gothic Revival bell floor, after 1862;
- Kornmarkt 6 – lordly corner shophouse, three-floor Gründerzeit clinker brick building with hipped mansard roof, 1894/1895, architects Curjel & Moser, Karlsruhe;
- Kornmarkt 7 – hotel and inn, spacious, essentially Baroque building, 18th century, mansard roof and spire light 1899, architects Curjel & Moser, Karlsruhe;
- Kreuzstraße 2a/b, Wilhelmstraße 30 – three-floor shophouse, Late Gründerzeit clinker brick building with mansard roof, 1898/1899, architects Philipp and Jean Hassinger, expanded 1932;
- Kreuzstraße 69 – former Karl-Geib-Museum, originally a Protestant schoolhouse; sophisticated porphyry building with hip roof, Renaissance Revival, 1850/1851, architect Overbeck; in the front garden "Pfalzsprung", two Baroque steles with reliefs;
- Kreuzstraße 76 – villalike house, imitation-ancient-framed brick building, 1882 (?);
- Kreuzstraße 78/80 – pair of semi-detached houses, porphyry quarrystone building, 1847/1864;
- Kurhausstraße – monument to J. E. P. Prieger, lifesize marble sculpture, 1867, Karl Cauer
- Kurhausstraße – monument to F. Müller; monolith with medallion, 1905, Stanislaus Cauer;
- Kurhausstraße 5 – house; plastered building on porphyry pedestal, about 1860, glazed oriel window 1911; built behind it, a brick building, 1891, architect Friedrich Metzger;
- Kurhausstraße 8 – Art Nouveau villa with Renaissance Revival motifs, 1903/1904, architect Hans Best;

- Kurhausstraße 12 – three-floor tenement, 1845/1846;
- Kurhausstraße 13 – lordly four-floor Classicist shophouse, 1840/1841, architect H. T. Kaufmann, tracery balcony 1880s; in the yard, one-floor plastered building, 1880/1881, architect August Heinke Jun;

- Kurhausstraße 17 – former inn and bathhouse; three-floor Classicist three-wing complex; middle building 1833, extra floors and expansion early 1860s; in the yard plastered building from the time of the complex's building; at the end of the garden two-and-a-half-floor timber-frame house, about 1860;
- Kurhausstraße 21 – four-floor, two-part shophouse with hip roof, Classicist motifs, about 1850; bridge to the bathhouse 1911/1912;
- Kurhausstraße 23 – bathhouse; Baroque Revival-Neoclassical four-wing complex with hip roofs, 1911/1912, architect Oscar Schütz, Cologne; three-floor middle building, two-floor wings, sculpture and reliefs by Ludwig Cauer;
- Kurhausstraße 28 – spa house; schloss-like four-wing complex, 1913, architect Emanuel von Seidl, Munich, three-floor expansion building, 1929, architect Roth, Darmstadt; spa park;
- Spa park (monumental zone) – laid out beginning in 1840, English garden with old buildings; therein spa house (see Kurhaustraße 28), before it round music pavilion, bronze figure of the "Grape Maid", Hanna Cauer, 1950; at the south point Elisabethenquelle (spring): open pump room above the spring with flanking open-air steps and platform, 1880s;
- Lämmergasse 5 – two-part Late Baroque corner house, partly timber-frame, after 1689; characterises street's appearance;
- Lämmergasse 9/11 – shophouse, partly timber-frame, staircase tower, essentially from the 15th or 16th century, no. 9 has three floors;
- Lämmergasse 13 – solid building with mighty half-hip roof, possibly from the late 18th century;
- Lämmergasse 26 – corner shophouse, partly timber-frame (plastered), possibly from the 18th century, makeover 1890; cellar before 1689;
- Lämmergasse 28 – spacious, essentially Baroque house, partly timber-frame (plastered), marked 1779, conversion 1861; cellar before 1689;
- Lämmergasse 34 – corner house, plastered timber-frame building, about or soon after 1700; characterises street's appearance;
- Lauergasse 5 – two-and-a-half-floor, plastered timber-frame house, partly slated, late 18th or early 19th century; part of the so-called Little Venice (Kleines Venedig);
- Lauergasse 9 – picturesque, plastered timber-frame house, 19th century;
- Lauergasse 11 – house, Gründerzeit brick building, 1885, architect Eduard Zimmermann;
- Magister-Faust-Gasse – Fischerpforte ("Fishermen's Gate"); part of the New Town fortifications: riverbank fortification with an opening to the Ellerbach;
- Magister-Faust-Gasse 2 – three-floor three-window house, mid 19th century; part of the so-called Little Venice;
- Magister-Faust-Gasse 4 – three-floor four-window house, plastered timber-frame building, later 18th century; part of the so-called Little Venice;
- Magister-Faust-Gasse 6 – three-floor three-window house, plastered timber-frame building, late 18th century, front wings 1890; part of the so-called Little Venice;
- Magister-Faust-Gasse 9 – three-floor house on irregular footprint, partly timber-frame, early 19th century;
- Magister-Faust-Gasse 15/17 – pair of semi-detached houses, plastered timber-frame buildings, possibly from the 18th century, no. 17 partly altered in 1894; characterises street's appearance;
- Magister-Faust-Gasse 21 – terraced house, partly timber-frame (plastered), early 19th century;
- Magister-Faust-Gasse 24 – former town barrel gauge; house, plastered timber-frame building, half-hip roof, 18th century; part of the so-called Little Venice;
- Magister-Faust-Gasse 25 – former Elt'scher Hof (estate); spacious house, Baroque building with half-hip roof over old (mediaeval?) cellar, gateway 1821, marked 1604 (?);
- Magister-Faust-Gasse 28 – three-floor terraced house, partly timber-frame (plastered), about 1800 with older parts, shop built in, 1896; part of the so-called Little Venice;
- Magister-Faust-Gasse 30 – three-floor terraced house, partly timber-frame (plastered), about 1800; part of the so-called Little Venice;
- Magister-Faust-Gasse 46 – three-floor plastered building, ground floor solid, both upper floors plastered timber framing;
- Magister-Faust-Gasse 47 – so-called Dr.-Faust-Haus; shophouse, open timber framing possibly from 1764, half-hip roof, cellar marked 1590;
- Magister-Faust-Gasse 48 – three-floor plastered timber-frame building with solid ground floor;
- Mannheimer Straße – Alte Nahebrücke ("Old Nahe Bridge"); crosses the Nahe, the Badewörth (bathing island) and the millpond, about 1300, altered several times;

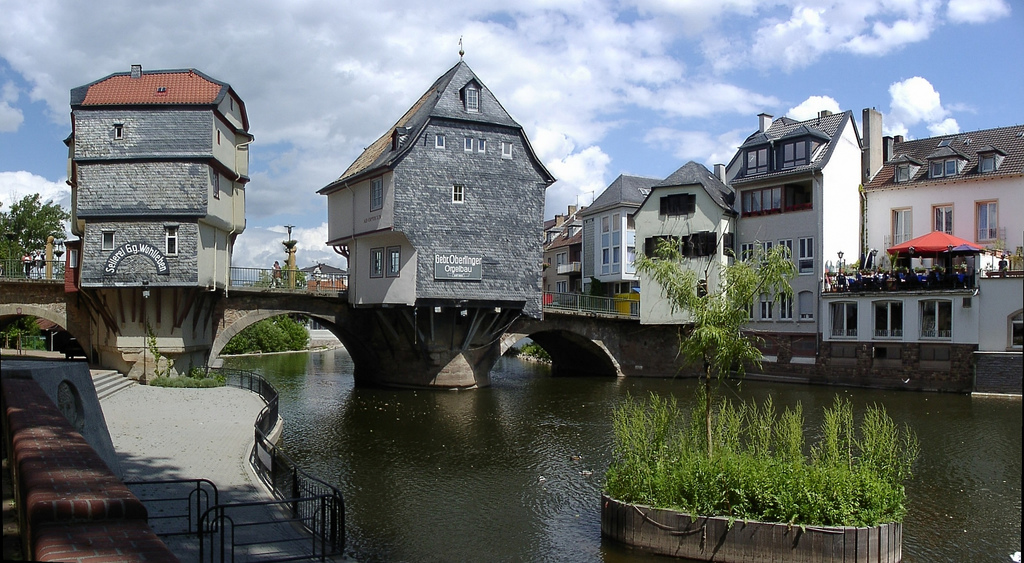
Mannheimer Straße – Alte Nahebrücke looking upstream towards the northeast

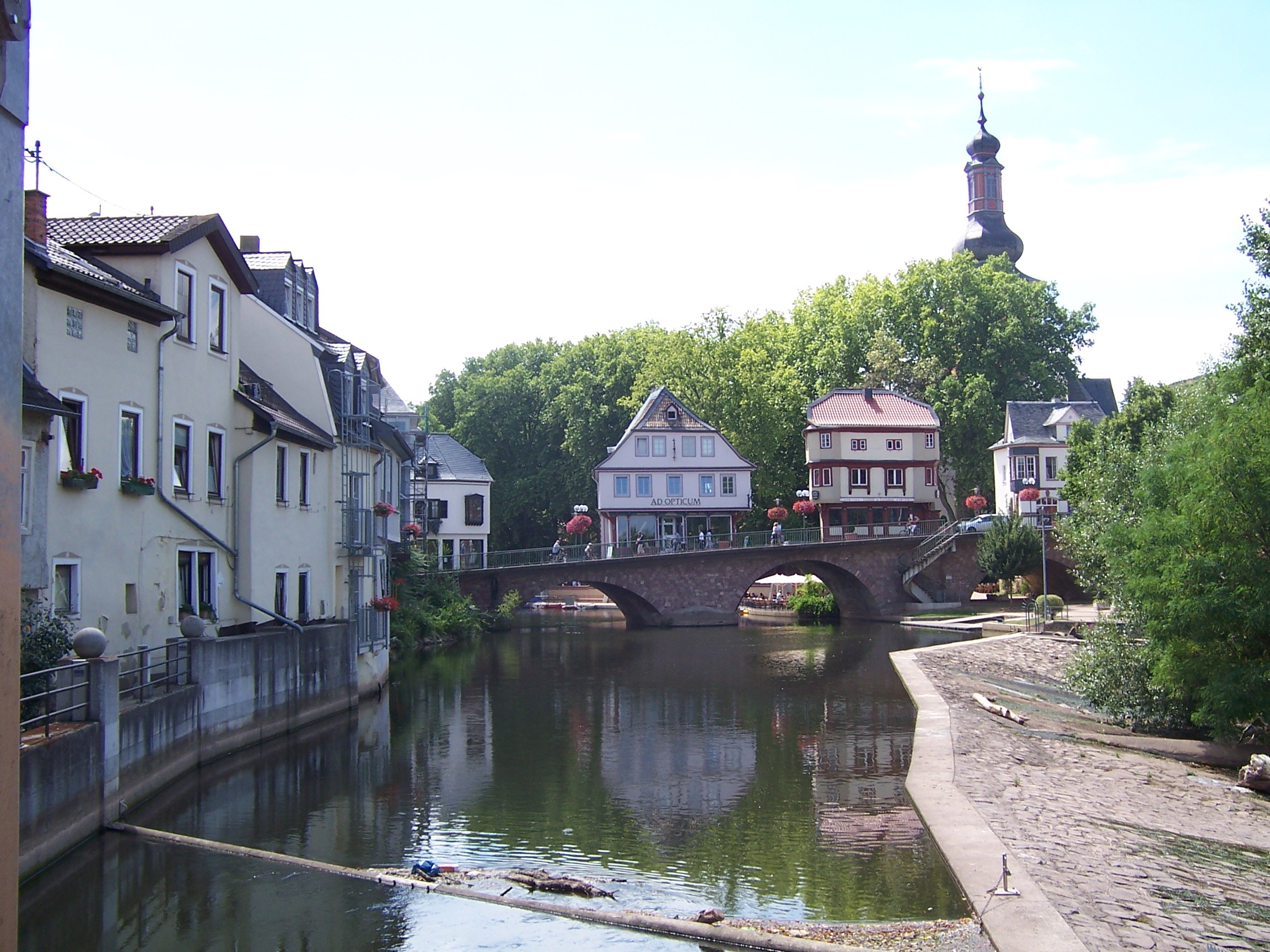
Mannheimer Straße – Alte Nahebrücke looking downstream towards the southwest; in the background the tower of the Pauluskirche

- Mannheimer Straße, graveyard (monumental zone) – laid out in 1827, since 1918 expanded several times, area divided into rectangular parcels with specially fenced-in graveyards of honour and special memorial places; old graveyard chapel, Historicized octagonal building, after 1843; Puricelli Chapel, Gothic Revival red-sandstone-block building with appointments from time of building, 1895, architect Ludwig Becker; many tombs, some created by the sculptor family Cauer, latter half of the 19th century and earlier half of the 20th century;
- Mannheimer Straße 6 – Dienheimer Hof (estate); Renaissance building, 1563, three-floor Classicist addition, early 19th century (?);
- Mannheimer Straße 12 – "Gottschalk des Juden Haus" ("Gottschalk the Jew's House"); three-floor corner shophouse, building complex in several parts, partly from the 16th century, joined together in the 18th century by building further floors;
- Mannheimer Straße 15 – stately three-floor shophouse, Classicist quarrystone building with hip roof, 1884;
- Mannheimer Straße 16 – three-floor shophouse, Late Baroque timber-frame building; cellar before 1689;
- Mannheimer Straße 17 – three-floor shophouse, plastered timber-frame building with hip roof, 18th century, shop built in about 1897; cellar before 1689;
- Mannheimer Straße 19 – three-floor shophouse, plastered timber-frame building with mansard roof, 18th century, shop built in, 1904;
- Mannheimer Straße 21 – three-and-a-half-floor shophouse, Late Classicist motifs, possibly from the third or fourth quarter of the 19th century;
- Mannheimer Straße 22 – three-floor shophouse, plastered timber-frame building with hip roof, marked 1764 and 1864 (Classicist conversion); two cellars before 1689;
- Mannheimer Straße 27 – three-floor corner shophouse, plastered timber-frame building, 18th century; cellar before 1689;
- Mannheimer Straße 29 – three-floor corner shophouse, Late Baroque, board-clad timber-frame building;
- Mannheimer Straße 32, 34, 36 – no. 32 three-floor shophouse, timber-frame building, 17th century (?), no. 34 plastered timber-frame building, no. 36 partly timber-frame;
- Mannheimer Straße 35 – Löwenapotheke (pharmacy), shophouse, imposing Renaissance Revival building, 1853, upper floor with hip roof 1950, architect Max Weber;
- Mannheimer Straße 39 and 41 – four-floor shophouses, timber-frame buildings, late 18th century, made over in the Classicist style in the 19th century and plastered, no. 39 over the cellar before 1689; characterises the street's appearance;
- In Mannheimer Straße 40 – three-floor Late Gothic spiral staircase
- Mannheimer Straße 43 – bridge house; three-floor corner shophouse, partly marble, 1849; part of the so-called Little Venice (Kleines Venedig);
- Mannheimer Straße 45 – bridge house; three-floor terrace shophouse, plastered timber-frame building with mansard roof, 18th or 19th century;
- Mannheimer Straße 47 – three-floor corner shophouse, partly timber-frame (plastered), hip roof, 18th century;
- Mannheimer Straße 49 – three-floor corner shophouse, clinker brick building, 1905, architects Henke & Sohn;
- Mannheimer Straße 52 and 54 – four-floor Late Baroque shophouses, partly timber-frame (plastered), latter half of the 18th century; part of the so-called Little Venice;
- Mannheimer Straße 53/55 – three-floor Late Baroque pair of semi-detached houses, 18th century, Classicist makeover in the 19th century; cellar possibly from about 1500;
- Mannheimer Straße 56 – three-floor terrace shophouse, partly timber-frame (plastered), latter half of the 18th century, addition on corbels; part of the so-called Little Venice;
- Mannheimer Straße 60 – three-floor shophouse, plastered timber-frame building with hip roof, 18th century; older cellar;
- Mannheimer Straße 62 – biaxial shophouse, partly timber-frame, marked 1671, mansard roof 18th century;
- Mannheimer Straße 64 – four-floor shophouse, partly timber-frame (plastered), latter half of the 18th century; cellar before 1689;
- Mannheimer Straße 66 – three-floor plastered timber-frame buildings with mansard roofs, conversion in the 19th and 20th centuries;
- Mannheimer Straße 68 – four-floor timber-frame house (sided), 18th century;
- Mannheimer Straße 69/71 – bridge house, building with half-hip roof, partly timber-frame plastered and slated, essentially before 1618; built behind it, four-floor cross-building with crow-stepped gables, 1933 and years following, architect Fr. K. Rheinstädter;
- Mannheimer Straße 77, Mühlenstraße 2 – three-floor shophouse, partly decorative timber framing, about 1600, mansard roof about 1700; Mühlenstraße 2 from the same time;
- Mannheimer Straße 78 – three-floor terrace shophouse, possibly after 1689, clinker brick façade 1895, architect Fr. K. Rheinstädter; older cellar;
- Mannheimer Straße 88, Kurhausstraße 1 – former Schwanenapotheke (pharmacy); two- and three-floor shophouse, sophisticated Renaissance Revival building, 1903, architect Hans Best;

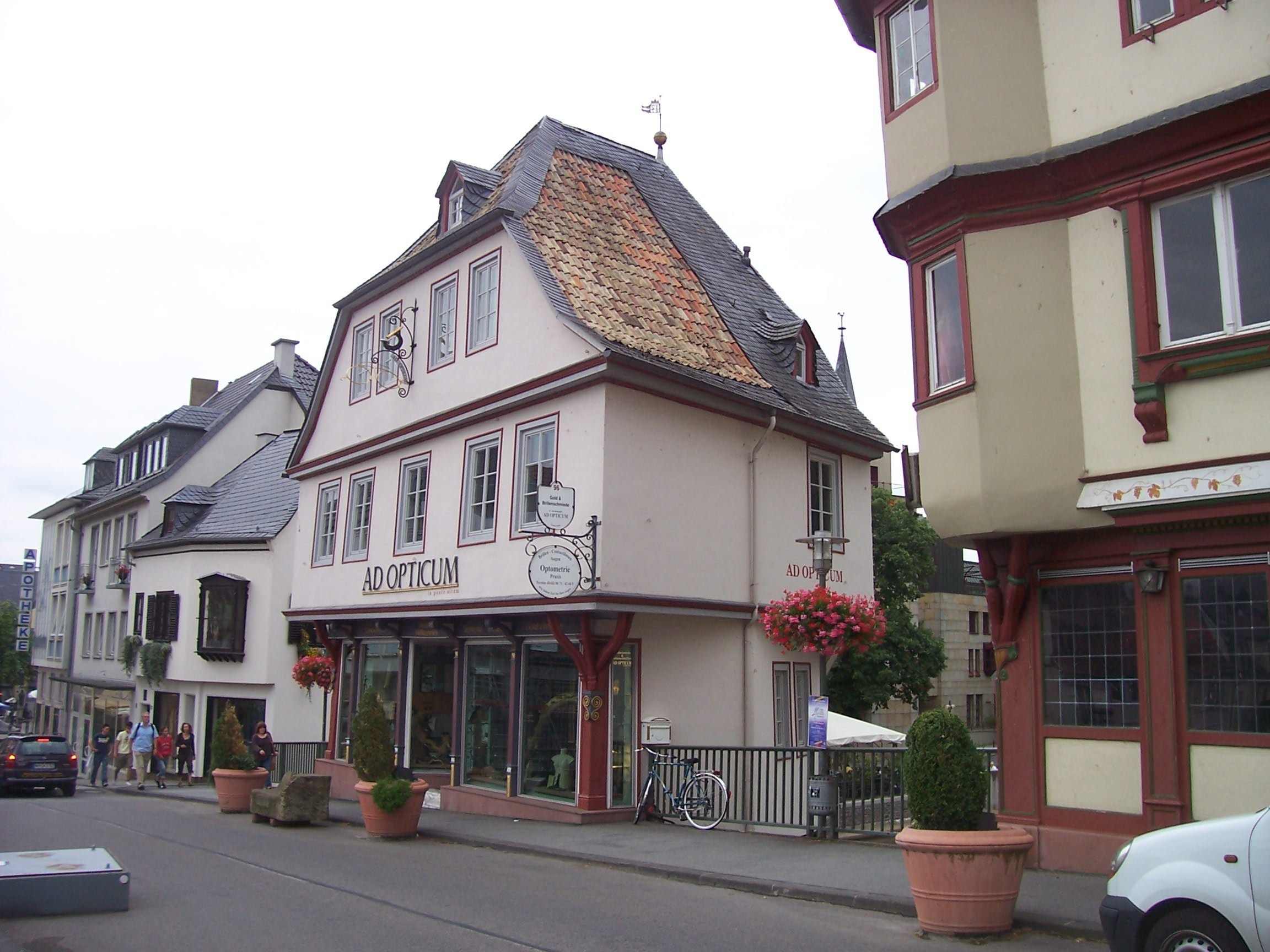
Mannheimer Straße 90 – Bridge house

- Mannheimer Straße 90 – bridge house; shophouse with mansard roof, 1829;
- Mannheimer Straße 91 – four-floor shophouse, sophisticated Late Historicist plastered building, 1903, architect Kaspar Bauer; older cellar;
- Mannheimer Straße 92 – bridge house; two- and four-floor plastered building, essentially from 1595, expansion in 1867, makeover in 1890, architect Wilhelm Metzger;
- Mannheimer Straße 94 – bridge house; three-floor timber-frame building, plastered and slated, 1609;
- Mannheimer Straße 96 – bridge house; broadly mounted plastered timber-frame building, 1612;
- Mannheimer Straße 99 – terrace shophouse, Baroque building with mansard roof, 18th century
- Mannheimer Straße 101 – terrace shophouse, Baroque building with mansard roof, 18th century;
- At Mannheimer Straße 114 – bronze insignia with bust of Field Marshal Gebhard Leberecht von Blücher;
- Mannheimer Straße 128 – Einhornapotheke (pharmacy); three-floor brick building with hipped mansard roof, Renaissance Revival, 1883, architect Heinrich Ruppert;
- Mannheimer Straße 130 – four-floor corner shophouse, Renaissance Revival and Art Nouveau motifs, 1905/1906, architect Hans Best;
- Mannheimer Straße 198/198a – axially symmetrical pair of semi-detached shophouses, Gründerzeit clinker brick building with hipped mansard roof, 1896/1897, architect Heinrich Ruppert;
- Mannheimer Straße 209 – corner house, brick building, Renaissance Revival motifs, 1889/1890, architect Heinrich Ruppert;
- Mannheimer Straße 230 – three-floor corner shophouse, brick building with hipped mansard roof, Renaissance Revival, 1898, architect Wilhelm Metzger;
- Mannheimer Straße 232/232a – three-floor house, clinker brick building with mansard roof, Renaissance Revival motifs, 1900/1901, architect Wilhelm Metzger;
- Mannheimer Straße 240 – three-floor terraced house, clinker brick building, Renaissance Revival, 1899, architect Wilhelm Metzger;
- Mannheimer Straße 254 – villalike house, building with mansard roof, Renaissance Revival, 1900, architect possibly Hermann Herter;
- Mannheimer Straße 256 – villalike house, building with hipped mansard roof, Renaissance Revival motifs, 1902/1903, architect Hermann Herter;
- Manteuffelstraße 1, Prinz-Friedrich-Karl-Straße 2 – pair of semi-detached houses with half-hip roof, Classicist, Heimatstil and Art Deco motifs, 1921/1922, architect Wilhelm Koban, Darmstadt;
- Manteuffelstraße 3 – lordly villa, Baroque Revival building with hip roof, 1925/1926, architect Richard Starig; templelike garage, garden hut;
- Mathildenstraße 1 – two-and-a-half-floor corner house, brick building with plastered surfaces, 1903, architects August Henke & Sohn; stable, one-floor building with hip roof, 1904;
- Mathildenstraße 4, 6, 8, 10 (monumental zone) – tenements, Renaissance Revival and Art Nouveau motifs, 1904, architects August Henke & Sohn;
- Matthäushof 2 – former Herf winegrowing estate; corner building with mansard roof, about 1780; at the south risalto fragments of the previous, late mediaeval building;
- Metzgergasse 12 – essentially a Baroque pair of semi-detached houses, partly timber-frame (plastered), conversion about 1800;
- Metzgergasse 16 – house, partly timber-frame, 17th or 18th century;
- Mittlerer Flurweg 2/4 – pair of semi-detached houses with hip roof, Art Deco motifs, 1925, architect Düttermann;
- Mittlerer Flurweg 6/8 – pair of semi-detached houses with hip roof, Art Deco motifs, 1925, architect Düttermann;
- Mittlerer Flurweg 18/20 – pair of semi-detached houses with hip roof, Art Deco motifs, 1925, architect Düttermann;
- Mittlerer Flurweg 30/32, Rheinstraße 16 – long corner house with hip roof, 1930/1931, architect Karl Heep;
- Moltkestraße 3 – villa, cube-shaped building with hip roof, 1913/1914, architect Hans Best, Neoclassical front wings 1939;
- Moltkestraße 6 – villa with hip roof, outdoor staircase, 1914/1915, architect Willibald Hamburger;
- Mühlenstraße 5 – three-floor shophouse, Late Historicist two-wing access way, 1881/1882, architect R. Wagner;
- Mühlenstraße 7 – shophouse, apparently essentially from about 1600, shop built in in mid 19th century;
- Mühlenstraße 8 – three-floor shophouse, partly timber-frame, (plastered), 18th century;
- Mühlenstraße 10 – long house-inn, conversion with Neoclassical motifs, 1897, Architects Brothers Lang;
- Mühlenstraße 11 – long shophouse, possibly from about 1800, shops built in in the 19th century;
- Mühlenstraße 21 – former Mehlwaage ("Flour Scales"); building with mansard roof, partly timber-frame (plastered), mid 18th century;
- Mühlenstraße 23/25, 32/34 – former Tress'sche Mühle (mill); three-floor building complex, marked 1816, partly dismantled 1898/1899, conversion 1942/1943, architect Max Weber;
- Mühlenstraße 33 – three-window house, brick building, latter half of the 19th century;
- Mühlenstraße 37 – former Reichsbank; three-floor corner building, representative Baroquified sandstone-block building with hipped mansard roof, 1901/1902, architects Curjel & Moser, Karlsruhe;
- Mühlenstraße 78 – Brothers Holz's former furniture factory and cabinetmaker's workshop; spacious three-floor brick building with hip roof, about 1880;
- Mühlenstraße 84 – sophisticated brick building, Renaissance Revival, 1891/1892, architect Philipp Hassinger;
- Nachtigallenweg 2 – Hotel Quellenhof; three-part building with a hip roof with a three-floor middle part, 1912/1913, architect Hugo Völker;
- Neufelder Weg 65 – villa, artificial-stone-framed building with hip roof, 1930/1931, architect Hans Best & Co;
- Neufelder Weg 67 – villalike house on L-shaped footprint, hip roof, 1920s;
- Neufelder Weg 79 – imposing villa with hip roof, 1929, architect Hans Best;
- Neufelder Weg 9/11, 13/15, 17/19 (monumental zone) – mirror-image pairs of semi-detached bungalows with hip roofs, in front gardens, 1927/1928, architect Martin Au;
- Obere Flotz 4, 6–29, Mittlerer Flurweg 27, 34, Waldemarstraße 51 (monumental zone) – residential buildings built in two building sections, typical for the time, with front gardens and yards; three varied type buildings with Historicized and Heimatstil motifs, 1926/1927, architect Jean Rheinstädter; blocklike, ornamentally framed, major residential buildings, 1929/1930, architect Martin Au;
- Oligsberg 5, 6, 11/12, Mittlerer Flurweg 10/12, 14/16, Waldemarstraße 29/31, 33/35 (monumental zone) – residential development for officers of the French occupation; five pairs of semi-detached houses and two fully detached houses arranged symmetrically around a grassy area, Artificial-stone-framed buildings with hip roofs, entrance risalti with Art Deco motifs, gardens, 1912, architect Wilhelm Koban, Darmstadt;
- Oranienpark (monumental zone) – almost square park within Kaiser-Wilhelm-Straße, Salinenstraße, Oranienstraße and Weinkauffstraße; laid out in two terraces in 1934: upper terrace in forms of the French Baroque, lower terrace as landscape park; former watertower, Classicist plastered building, about 1830; warriors' memorial 1870/1871, Corinthian column with round shield; bronze figure of a "Schwebende Göttin" ("Floating Goddess"), H. Cauer, 1939;
- Oranienstraße 3 – spacious three-floor house with addition on the back, Classicist motifs, 1876/1877, architect J. Lang;
- Oranienstraße 4a – Gründerzeit villa, partly timber-frame, 1903/1904, architect Peter Kreuz;
- Oranienstraße 7, Salinenstraße 75 – three-floor pair of semi-detached villas with hip roof, Renaissance Revival motifs, 1902/1903, architect Peter Kreuz;
- Oranienstraße 10/12 – villalike pair of semi-detached houses with hip roof, Art Nouveau motifs, 1905/1906, architect Peter Kreuz;
- Oranienstraße 13/15 – villalike pair of semi-detached houses, clinker brick building with hip roof, Renaissance Revival, 1903/1904, architect Peter Kreuz;
- Oranienstraße 14 – elaborate villa resembling a country house, 1906, architect Peter Kreuz;
- Oranienstraße 17 – villalike house with hip roof, Renaissance Revival and Art Nouveau motifs, 1905/1906, architect Peter Kreuz;
- Oranienstraße 19 – villalike house with odd-shaped roofscape, Renaissance Revival motifs, 1904/1905, architect Peter Kreuz (?);
- Pestalozzistraße 4, 6, 8 – one-floor buildings with mansard roofs, 1925/1926, architect Karl Heep;
- Pestalozzistraße 5 – one-floor villa, partly hipped mansard roof, 1926/1927, architect Martin Au;
- Pestalozzistraße 9 – villalike house with hip roof, 1926, architect Peter Riedle;
- "Pfeffermühlchen" ("Little Peppermill") – Part of the town fortifications on the Nahe's bank; the pedestal of the Stumpfer Turm ("Stub Tower") at the point where the Ellerbach empties into the Nahe was walled up in 1845 and a Baroque roof cap added;
- Pfingstwiese 7/7a – house with wine cellar, brick building with hip roof, 1906/1907, architect C. W. Kron;
- Philippstraße 3 – two-and-a-half-floor corner house, Renaissance Revival motifs, 1900/01, Architects Brothers Lang;
- Philippstraße 5 – corner house, yellow clinker brick building with hip roof, Renaissance Revival motifs, 1895/1896, Architects Brothers Lang;
- Philippstraße 6 – lordly villa with hipped mansard roof, Renaissance Revival motifs, 1900/1901;
- Philippstraße 8 – villalike building with hipped mansard roof, corner tower with loggia, Renaissance Revival motifs, 1900/1901, architect Heinrich Müller;
- Philippstraße 9 – house, clinker brick building with hip roof, Renaissance Revival motifs, 1906/1907, architect Friedrich Metzger;
- Philippstraße 10 – villalike house, sophisticated building with hipped mansard roof, Renaissance Revival motifs, marked 1902, architect possibly Heinrich Müller;
- Planiger Straße 4 – primary school; Late Classicist porphyry-block building with hip roof, 1870;
- Planiger Straße 15/15a – three-floor sandstone-framed plastered buildings, Renaissance Revival motifs, 1908/1909, architect Kaspar Bauer; no. 15 with towerlike oriel window, 15a with middle risalto; characterises square's appearance;
- Planiger Straße 27 – two-and-a-half-floor corner shophouse with wine cellar buildings, clinker brick building with hip roof, 1896/1897, architect August Henke;
- Planiger Straße 147 – Seitz-Ensinger-Noll-Maschinenbau AG's factory complex; sophisticated three-and-a-half-floor Neoclassical building with hip roof, 1911, architect Hans Best, expansion in 1912; one-floor building with saw-tooth roof, 1928/1929, architect Erwin Hahn;
- Planiger Straße 69, 71/73, 75/77 (monumental zone) – small residential development of two-and-a-half- and three-and-a-half-floor multi-family dwellings, brick buildings with gable risalti, 1880–1895, architect Johann Au;
- Poststraße 7 – former town scrivener's office; three-floor Renaissance building, partly decorative timber framing, half-hip roof, 1540; shop built in and plastered façade 19th century;
- Poststraße 8 – spacious shophouse; three-floor building with hip roof, partly timber-frame (plastered), shopping arcades, mid 19th century;
- Poststraße 11 – three-floor five-axis timber-frame building (plastered), partly solid, 18th century;
- Poststraße 15 – terrace shophouse; timber-frame building (plastered), possibly before the end of the 18th century; cellar older;
- Poststraße 17 – three-floor, two-part shophouse, partly timber-frame; three-window house, mid 19th century, conversion and expansion in 1899/1900, architect Hans Best; cellar older;
- Poststraße 21 – former castle house "Zum Braunshorn"; three-floor building with mansard roof, partly timber-frame (plastered), essentially about 1573 (stairway thus marked), further floors and renovation possibly in the 18th century;

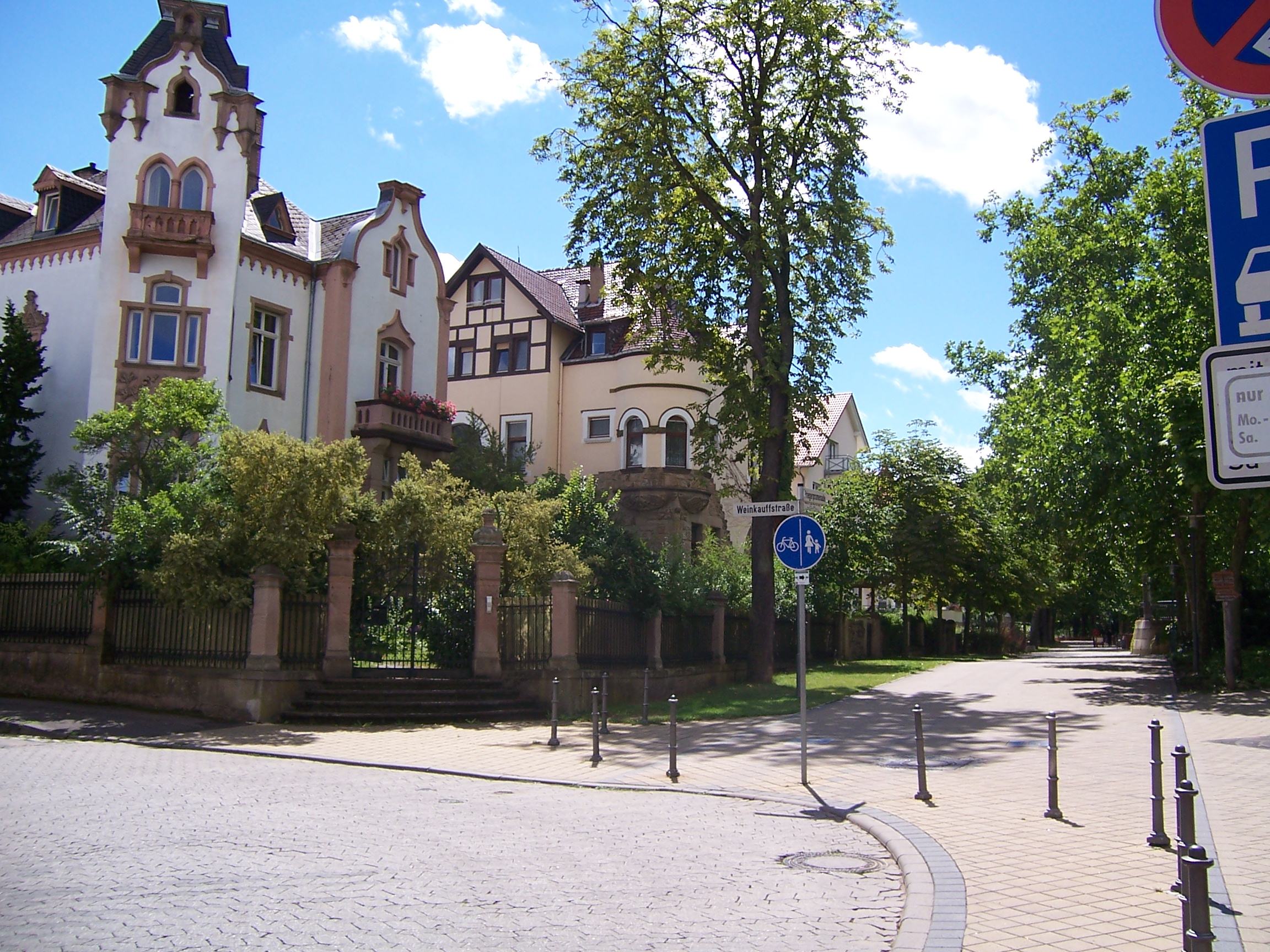
Priegerpromenade 1 and 3

- Priegerpromenade 1 – representative Historicist villa with hip roof, marked 1895/1896, architect Wilhelm Jost, Berlin;
- Priegerpromenade 3 – spacious Art Nouveau villa with motifs from castle architecture, 1906/1907, architect Peter Kreuz;
- Priegerpromenade 7 – lordly villa, Renaissance Revival and Art Nouveau motifs, twin-tower-gateway complex, 1906/1907, architect Hans Best;
- Priegerpromenade 9 – lordly villa resembling a country house, Renaissance Revival and Art Nouveau motifs, 1905, architect Hans Best;
- Priegerpromenade 17 – former "Logier- und Badehaus" ("Lodging and Bathing House"); lordly three-and-a-half-floor Neoclassical building with hip roof, about 1870, architect Ludwig Bohnstedt;
- Priegerpromenade 21 – Villa Elisa, imposing two-and-a-half-floor plastered building on asymmetrical footprint, staircase tower, about 1870;
- Prinz-Friedrich-Karl-Straße 4 – villa, large-size divided building with hip roof, 1916/1917, architect Willibald Hamburger;
- Raugrafenstraße 2 – villa, cube-shaped building with hip roof, 1927/1928, architect Wolfgang Goecke;
- Raugrafenstraße 4 – small villa, cube-shaped building with hip roof, 1927/1928, architect Paul Gans;
- Reitschule 12 – house with hip roof, Renaissance Revival motifs, 1903/1904, architect Jacob Karst;
- Reitschule 14 – villalike house with hip roof, Renaissance Revival motifs, 1903, architect Jacob Karst;
- Reitschule 16 – spacious villa with hip roof and rooftop tower, Renaissance Revival and Art Nouveau motifs, 1903, architect Jacob Karst;
- Reitschule 17/19 – pair of semi-detached houses in country house style, Renaissance Revival motifs, 1898, architect Jacob Karst;
- Reitschule 21 – house, brick building with hip roof, Renaissance Revival motifs, 1901, architect Jacob Karst;
- Rheingrafenstraße – so-called Kuhtempel ("Cow Temple"), Classicist lookout pavilion, shortly before 1840;
- Rheingrafenstraße 1 – sculptor family Cauer's house, Classicist plastered building, 1839, small studio building, 1901, architect Jacob Karst;
- Rheingrafenstraße 1a – house, Renaissance Revival building, 1901/1902, architect Jean Rheinstädter;
- Rheingrafenstraße 2 – former district building office; villalike official building, Late Historicist building with hipped mansard roof, 1905/1906, architect Jacob Damm;
- Rheingrafenstraße 3 – sophisticated house with hipped mansard roof, Renaissance Revival motifs, 1903/1904, Architects Brothers Lang;
- Rheingrafenstraße 5 – sophisticated corner house, brick building with hipped mansard roof, Renaissance Revival motifs, 1895, Architects Brothers Lang;
- Rheingrafenstraße 15 – Gründerzeit villa, brick building with hip roof, Renaissance Revival motifs, marked 1889, architect Philipp Hassinger; wine cellar building from the same time;
- Rheingrafenstraße 19/19a – plastered buildings, partly timber-frame, segmented hip roof, 1900/1901, architect Kaspar Bauer;
- Rheingrafenstraße 27, Graf-Siegfried-Straße 1/3 – three-house block with officers' dwellings, 1912/1913, architect Wilhelm Koban, Darmstadt;
- Rheingrafenstraße 34 – lordly villa with hipped mansard roof and corner tower, Renaissance Revival motifs, 1902, architect Jacob Metzger;
- Rheingrafenstraße 35 – lordly villa, corner tower with tented roof, Renaissance Revival and Art Nouveau motifs, 1903/1904, architect Hans Best; characterises street's appearance;
- Rheingrafenstraße 36 – villa in country house style, 1908/1909, architect Hans Best;
- Rheingrafenstraße 37 – representative villa in country house style, one-floor plastered building with roof expanded into two floors, 1905/1906, architect Hans Weszkalnys, Saarbrücken;
- Rheingrafenstraße 38 – villa resembling a country house, spacious plastered building with gable and hip roof, 1921, architect Alexander Ackermann;
- Rheingrafenstraße 46 – villa with hip roof, timber framing with clinker brick, 1935, architect Paul Schmitthenner, Stuttgart;
- Ringstraße 82/84/86 and 88/90/92 – two groups of two-and-a-half-floor houses, 1898/1899, architects Philipp and Jean Hassinger, two-colour brick buildings on porphyry pedestals;
- Ringstraße 94/96 – pair of semi-detached houses, clinker brick building with hipped mansard roof, Renaissance Revival, marked 1899, architect Wilhelm Metzger;
- Ringstraße 112 – primary school and Hauptschule; three-floor building with mansard roof, Art Deco motifs, 1926 and years following, architect Willibald Hamburger; caretaker's house from the time of building;
- Ringstraße 102/104, 106/108/110, Gustav-Pfarrius-Str. 14,17 and Jean-Winckler-Str. 2 (monumental zone) – whole complex of buildings; two like-shaped groups of houses, buildings with hip roofs joined by three-floor staircase towers, 1926/1927, architect Hugo Völker;

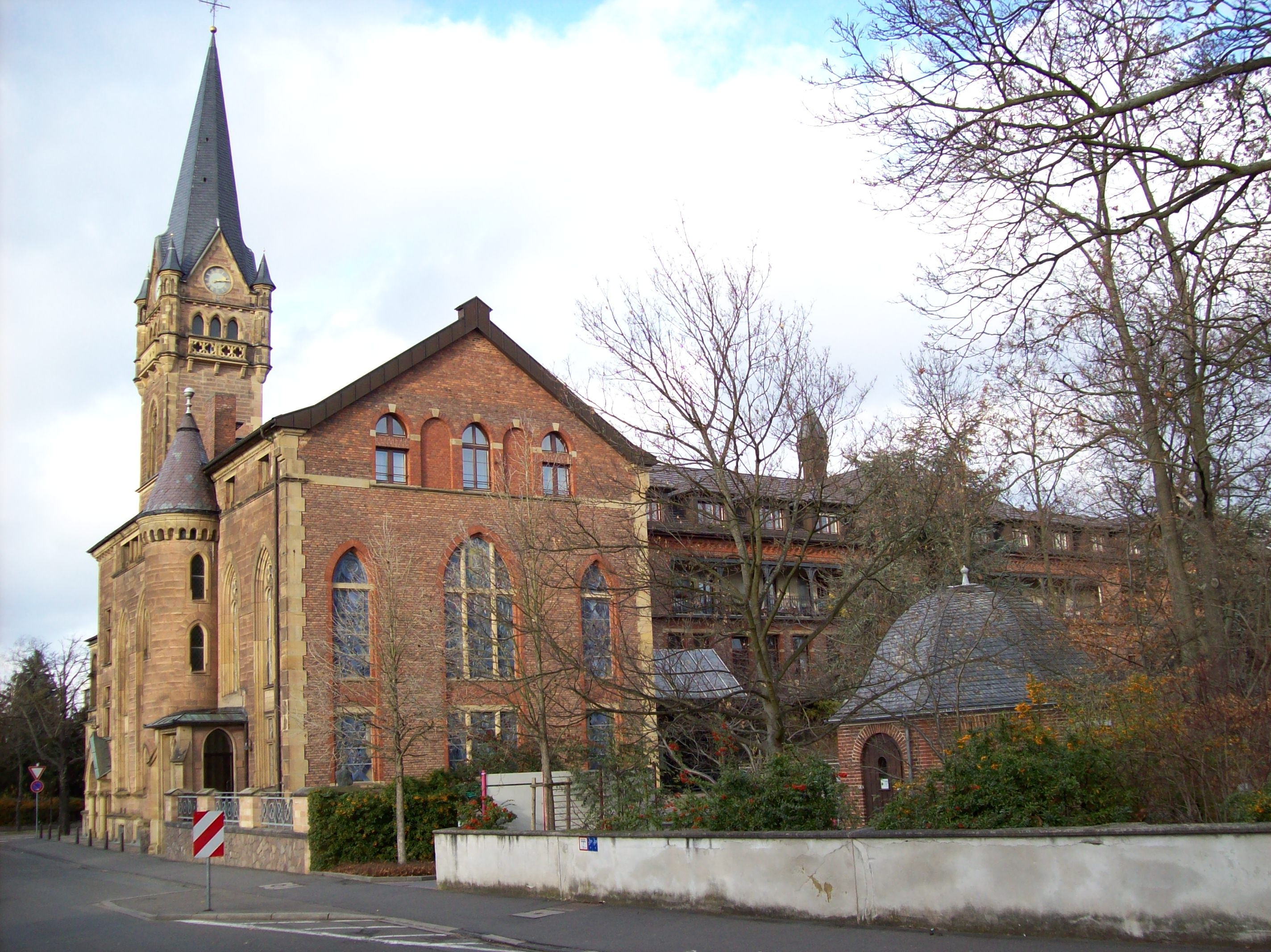
Deaconry institutions

- Ringstraße 58, Graf-Friedrich-Straße15, Waldemarstraße 24, Protestant Deaconry institutions (monumental zone) – building complex in the park put together beginning in 1897, Gothicized sandstone and brick buildings (first building section), architect Friedrich Langenbach, Barmen; 1912–1954 matching additional buildings, architect Willibald Hamburger;
- Römerstraße 1 – three-floor corner shophouse, sophisticated Gründerzeit building, marked 1905;
- Römerstraße 1a – narrow three-floor Art Nouveau building, about 1900;
- Röntgenstraße 6 – villa with hipped mansard roof, 1926/1927, architect Karl Heep;
- Röntgenstraße 16 – house with gable or mansard roof, barge-rafter gable, 1907/1908, architect Gustav Ziemer, Düsseldorf
- Röntgenstraße 20, Gustav-Pfarrius-Straße 30 – pair of semi-detached houses; building with hip roof on brick pedestal, 1935, architect Karl Schneider;
- Röntgenstraße 22/24 – pair of semi-detached houses; building with hip roof with slate-clad corner oriels, 1927/1928, architect Richard Starig;
- Röntgenstraße 25, 27, 29, 31 – group of buildings made up of four small two-floor single-family houses, buildings with hip roofs with gable risalti, 1925/1926, architect Hugo Völker;
- Röntgenstraße 33 – villalike house, cube-shaped building with hip roof, 1926/1927, architect Conrad Schneider; characterises the street's appearance;
- Roonstraße 3 – villa with mansard-like stepped hip roof, 1916/1917, architect Philipp Hassinger;
- Rosengarten 2 – Hauptschule; Gründerzeit brick building with hip roofs, 1898 and years following, architect Friedrich Hartmann;
- Roseninsel (monumental zone) – spa-related greenspace on the Nahe's bank along Priegerpromenade; pavilion above the disused Oranienquelle (spring), 1916; so-called Milchhäuschen ("Little Milk House"), crenellated turret, 19th century; Bismarck Monument, Hugo Cauer, 1897 (moved from the Kornmarkt after 1945); so-called "Durstgruppe" ("Thirst Group"), Ludwig Cauer, 1892;
- Roßstraße 6 – former "Maison Bold"; shophouse, Classicist plastered building, about 1850;
- Roßstraße 25 – Gründerzeit corner house, building with hip roof and knee wall, Renaissance Revival motifs, 1881/1882, architect J. Schaeffer; cellar about 1600;
- Roßstraße 33 – former inn; three-floor plastered building with imitation-ancient ornament, about 1860
- Roßstraße 35 – three-floor Classicistically structured house, about 1860;
- Rüdesheimer Straße 11 – villa with knee wall, country house style, soon after 1900;
- Rüdesheimer Straße 21 – sophisticatedly structured house, about 1850;
- Rüdesheimer Straße 38 – house, Classicistically structured brick building, early 1870s;
- Rüdesheimer Straße 46, 48 and 50 – three-part corner shophouse, Historicist brick building with mansard roof, 1906/1907, architect Fritz Wagner;
- Rüdesheimer Straße 52 – corner shophouse, Historicist brick building with mansard roof, 1907, architect Joseph Reuther;
- Rüdesheimer Straße 58 – Gründerzeit corner house, brick building, Renaissance Revival motifs, 1891/1892, architect Karl Keller;
- Rüdesheimer Straße 60–68 (even numbers) – Landes-Lehr- and Versuchsanstalt für Weinbau, Gartenbau and Landwirtschaft ("State Teaching and Experimental Institute for Winegrowing, Gardening and Agriculture"); no. 68 brick building with hipped mansard roof, Renaissance Revival motifs, 1900, in the garden warriors' memorial 1914/1918; wine cellar building from the same time and in the same style; packing and shipping house, about 1920; no. 62 clinker brick building, 1896; no. 60 Baroquified building with mansard roof, 1910/1911;
- Rüdesheimer Straße 74 – Historicized terraced house with gateway, brick building with mansard roof, 1903/1904, architect Joseph Buther;
- Rüdesheimer Straße 86 – house, about 1860; winepress house, 1888, architect Philipp Hassinger; worker's house with stable, 1893, architect Johann Henke;
- Rüdesheimer Straße 87 – villa and wine cellar building, lordly plastered building with hip roofs, Renaissance Revival motifs, 1894/1895, architect Friedrich Metzger;
- Rüdesheimer Straße 95–127 (odd numbers) (monumental zone) – semicircular building complex with gardens, spire light gable two floors tall in the middle, lobbies with polygonal oriels, 1924 and years following, architect Hugo Völker;
- Saline Karlshalle 3, 4, 6, 7 – Baroque bungalows, plastered timber-frame buildings (except no. 4), no. 7 marked 1732;
- Saline Karlshalle 8 – former Sudhaus ("Boiling House"); spacious building with mansard roof, 18th century;
- Saline Karlshalle 12 – well house; plastered building with freestanding stairway, 1908, architect Hans Best;
- Saline Theodorshalle 28 – former children's home; representative building with hipped mansard roof, Classicist motifs, 1911, architect Hans Best;
- Salinenstraße – Salinenbrücke ("Saltworks Bridge"); six-arch sandstone-block bridge, bridge across the Nahe between Salinenstraße and Theodorshalle saltworks, 1890;
- Salinenstraße 43 – two-and-a-half-floor villalike house, brick building with hip roof, Renaissance Revival motifs, 1896/1897, architect August Henke;
- Salinenstraße 45 – two-and-a-half-floor house, porphyry building with hip roof, about 1860, side building with arcade and barge-rafter gable, 1897, architects Brothers Lang;
- Before Salinenstraße 47/49 – five armorial tablets, marked 1891/1892, Cauer workshop;
- Salinenstraße 53 – two-and-a-half-floor corner shophouse, Late Classicist building with hip roof, about 1860;
- Salinenstraße 57a – corner house, elaborately structured Late Historicist building with mansard roof, 1898, architect Rheinstädter;
- Salinenstraße 57 – Late Classicist plastered building, 1851, architect August Henke Jun;
- Salinenstraße 60 – two-and-a-half-floor house, clinker brick building with hip roof, Renaissance Revival motifs, 1889, architect Philipp Hassinger; one-and-a-half-floor wine cellar building; front-garden fencing and segmented gateway, 1919, as well as dwelling and office building in the yard, 1921/1922, architect Alexander Ackermann;
- Salinenstraße 63 – former "Hotel Kriegelstein"; three-floor Classicist building with hip roof, joining onto the back, bathing wing, 1852/1853, architect Karst;
- Salinenstraße 68 – two-and-a-half-floor house, Classicist building with hip roof, about 1870, side building 1904, architects Henke & Sohn;
- Salinenstraße 69 – lordly villa with hip roof, Renaissance and Classicist motifs, about 1865;
- Salinenstraße 72 – sophisticated two-and-a-half-floor corner house, Neoclassical plastered building, about 1870;
- Salinenstraße 74/76 – pair of semi-detached houses, sandstone-framed brick building with hip roof, Renaissance Revival motifs, 1894/1895, architect Jean Henke;
- Salinenstraße 82 – villalike house with hip roof, 1921/1922, architect Vorbius;
- Salinenstraße 84 – one-floor villa with hip roof, Classicist motifs, 1925/1926, architect Hans Best;
- Salinenstraße 90 – lordly villa with hip roof with corner pavilions, 1921/1922, architect Hans Best;
- Salinenstraße 92/94, Moltkestraße 8 – sophisticated three-wing building with hip roof, Art Deco motifs, 1921/1922, architect Alexander Ackermann;
- Salinenstraße 95 – Gründerzeit bungalow, clinker brick building with hipped mansard roof, Renaissance Revival motifs, 1895, architect Johann Stanger;
- Salinenstraße 113/115 – pair of semi-detached houses, spire light gable with half-hips, Renaissance Revival and Art Nouveau motifs, 1907/1908, architect Fritz Wagner;
- Salinenstraße 114/116 – Doppelvilla, langgestreckter building with hip roof, 1921/1922, architect Hans Best
- Salinenstraße 117 – artificial-stone-framed cube-shaped building with hip roof, Art Deco motifs, 1927/1928, architects Hans Best & Co.;
- Salinenstraße 118 – house with winepress house, clinker brick building with pyramidal roof, 1898/1899, architect Himmler
- Salinenstraße 119, 121, 123, 125, 127, 129, 131 (monumental zone) – seven-house group; houses with forward eaves but forward-gabled lobbies, Art Deco motifs, 1921/1922, architect Paul Gans;
- Salinental – includes the Karlshalle and Theodorshalle saltworks east of Salinenstraße (Bundesstraße 48) in the town's southwest; graduation tower no. 6, 18th century; monument to K. Altenkirch, Ludwig Thormalen, 1934;
- Schloßstraße 1 – lordly villa, building with hip roof, Renaissance Revival motifs, about 1862, architect C. Conradi;
- Schloßstraße 2a – Art Deco villa with hipped mansard roof, 1928/1929, architect Paul Gans;
- Schloßstraße 4 – cube-shaped building with hip roof, Renaissance Revival, side building, 1879/1880, architect J. Schaeffer
- Schloßstraße 5 – guesthouse, three-floor cube-shaped building with hip roof, timber-frame side building about 1850;
- Schöffenstraße 3 – two-and-a-half-floor house, brick building, 1892, architect August Henke;
- Schöne Aussicht 1 – residential building, long building with hip roof, 1927/1928, architect Wolfgang Goecke;
- Schöne Aussicht 3/5/7/9 – long building with hip roof and corner oriels, 1924/1925, architect Gruben;
- Schöne Aussicht 10/12, Dr.-Geisenheyner-Straße 5 – houses picturesquely staggered with each other, 1926/1927, architect Hans Best & Co.;
- Schöne Aussicht 11–21 – long residential building with hip roof, 1924/1925, architect Gruben;
- Schöne Aussicht 1–25 (odd numbers), 10–16 (even numbers), Dr.-Geisenheyner Straße 1, 3, 5, 2–12 (even numbers) as well as Winzenheimer Straße 23 and 25 (monumental zone) – workers' housing development, craftsmen and white-collar workers; pairs of semi-detached houses and terraced buildings joined together into dwelling units with hip or gable roofs in gardens, some with corner oriels or front wings, 1924–1927 under town building councillor Hugo Völker's leadership;
- Schuhgasse 1 – three-floor shophouse, plastered timber-frame building, possibly 18th century, shop built in 1881, architect Jacob Kossmann; cellar before 1689;
- Schuhgasse 2 – three-floor shophouse, partly timber-frame (plastered), hip roof, possibly shortly after 1849 with Baroque parts; cellar before 1689;
- Schuhgasse 3 – three-floor house, partly timber-frame (plastered), mansard roof, 18th century; cellar before 1689;
- Schuhgasse 4 and 6 – two Classicist three-floor three-window houses, about 1850; under no. 4, cellar before 1689, no. 6 Gründerzeit shop built in;
- Schuhgasse 5 – two-and-a-half-floor dwelling and wine cellar house, Gründerzeit clinker brick building, 1882/1883, architect Josef Pfeiffer; cellar before 1689;
- Schuhgasse 7 – three-floor house, partly timber-frame (plastered), essentially from the 18th century, partly Classicist makeover 19th century; cellar older;
- Schuhgasse 8 – three-floor Late Classicist house, 1850; cellar older;
- Schuhgasse 9 – three-floor two-window house, plastered timber-frame building, about 1800 (?); cellar before 1689;
- Schuhgasse 11 – stately three-floor house, partly timber-frame (plastered), about 1800;
- Schuhgasse 13 – three-floor three-window house, about 1800 (?), partly Classicist makeover, about 1850; cellar before 1689
- Sigismundstraße 16/18 – pair of semi-detached houses with hipped mansard roof, Renaissance Revival and Art Nouveau motifs, 1907/1908, architect Wilhelm Metzger;
- Sigismundstraße 20/22 – pair of semi-detached bungalows, sandstone-framed brick building, 1908/1909, architect Wilhelm Metzger;
- Stromberger Straße 1/3 – villalike pair of semi-detached houses, brick building with hipped mansard roof and corner tower, Renaissance Revival motifs, 1907/1908, architect Anton Kullmann;
- Stromberger Straße 2 – Neoclassical villa with three-floor tower with Muse figures, side building, Renaissance Revival watertower, early 1870s, architect Paul Wallot, Oppenheim;
- Stromberger Straße 4 – Gründerzeit villa, picturesquely grouped clinker brick building, 1879, architect Gustav F. Hartmann;
- Stromberger Straße 5/7 – villalike pair of semi-detached houses, brick building, Renaissance Revival motifs, 1904, architect Anton Kullmann;
- Stromberger Straße 6 – Gründerzeit villa, picturesquely grouped clinker brick building, partly timber-frame, 1879, architect Gustav F. Hartmann;
- Stromberger Straße 8 – Michel winegrowing estate; Gründerzeit villa, clinker brick building with odd-shaped roofscape, 1888, architect Jacob Karst;
- Stromberger Straße 9 – small villa made up of two structures thrust through each other at right angles, 1902/1903, architect Anton Kullmann;
- Stromberger Straße 10 – former "Restaurationslokal"; one-and-a-half-floor corner building with round arch openings, 1879, architect Josef Pfeiffer, side building given upper floors in 1911 and brought into line, architect Friedrich Metzger;
- Stromberger Straße 11 – villalike house made up of two structures standing at right angles to each other, 1902, architect Anton Kullmann;
- Stromberger Straße 12 – Gründerzeit villa, clinker brick building with hip roof, 1887, architect Jacob Kossmann, partial conversion 1924;
- Stromberger Straße 15, 17, 19 – Paul Anheußer winegrowing estate; one-floor building with pitched roof with two-floor side axes, 1888, architect Jacob Karst;
- Stromberger Straße 22 – house, clinker brick building with gable risalto, 1888, architect Heinrich Ruppert;
- Stromberger Straße 30 – villa, one-floor building with hipped mansard roof, 1924/1925, architect Anton Reiter;
- Sulzer Hof 2 – house, brick building with belltower, one-floor brick side building, 1892;
- Viktoriastraße 3 – two-and-a-half-floor Gründerzeit corner house, 1883, architect R. Wagener;
- Viktoriastraße 4 – house; sandstone-framed plastered building, about 1870, wrought-iron balcony about 1906; characterises street's appearance;
- Viktoriastraße 7 – Gründerzeit terraced house; two-and-a-half-floor sandstone-framed clinker brick building, 1879, architect R. Wagener;
- Viktoriastraße 9 – Gründerzeit corner shophouse, Neoclassical motifs, 1877, architect Johann Au;
- Viktoriastraße 11/13/15 – lordly palacelike group of three houses with three-floor middle building, hip roofs, 1878/1879, architect C. Conradi; characterises the street's appearance;
- Viktoriastraße 18 – Gründerzeit house; building with hip roof with knee wall, Renaissance Revival, 1882, architect Josef Pfeiffer; characterises street's appearance;
- Viktoriastraße 19 – Gründerzeit terraced house, three-floor clinker brick building, 1882, architect August Henke;
- Viktoriastraße 22 – Gründerzeit terraced house, two-and-a-half-floor clinker brick building, 1888, architect August Henke;
- Viktoriastraße 23 – corner shophouse; two-and-a-half-floor brick building, Renaissance Revival motifs, 1878, architect Jean Jenke jr., shop and display window expansion 1888;
- Viktoriastraße 24 – two-and-a-half-floor house; sandstone-framed clinker brick building, Renaissance Revival, 1894, architect Christian Zier;
- Viktoriastraße 26 – house, Classicistically structured clinker brick building, possibly from shortly before 1876;
- Weinkauffstraße 2/4 – villalike pair of semi-detached houses on irregular footprint, 1901/1902, architect Hans Best;
- Weinkauffstraße 6 – Art Nouveau villa with hip roof, 1902/1903, architect Hans Best;
- Weinkauffstraße 8 – three-floor villa with hip roof, Art Deco motifs, 1921/1922, architect Alexander Ackermann;
- Weinkauffstraße 10 – one-and-a-half-floor villa, 1922/1923, architect Alexander Ackermann, mansard roof 1927;
- Weyersstraße 3 – lordly villa with hip roof, 1925, architect Hermann Tesch, somewhat newer garden house;
- Weyersstraße 6 – villalike house with a tented or mansard roof, 1920s;
- Weyersstraße 8 – house; cube-shaped building with hip roof, partly Expressionist motifs, 1925/1926, architect Karl Heep;
- Wilhelmstraße – Wilhelmsbrücke; bridge across the Nahe; three-arch red sandstone structure with two towers and expanded arcaded approach, 1905/1906, architect Hermann Billing, Karlsruhe, reconstructed after 1945; relief in the "Fischerturm" (tower), 1932 by Ludwig Cauer * Wilhelmstraße 2 – former "Brückenschänke" inn; one-floor, pavilionlike commercial building, 1922, architect Otto Völker;
- Wilhelmstraße 48 – three-floor shophouse, Renaissance Revival and Art Nouveau motifs, 1906, architect Heinrich Ruppert;
- Wilhelmstraße 50 – three-floor shophouse, oriel window, Renaissance Revival and Art Nouveau motifs, 1906, architect Heinrich Ruppert;
- Winzenheimer Straße 3/3a – mirror-image pair of semi-detached houses, sandstone-framed clinker brick building, 1898/1899, architect Anton Kullmann;
- Winzenheimer Straße 5 – two-and-a-half-floor villalike house, Late Gründerzeit sandstone-framed brick building, 1900, architect Anton Kullmann;
- Winzenheimer Straße 7 – spacious villalike house with side buildings, 1888/1889, architect Schott; brick building with hip roof, Renaissance Revival; characterises the street's appearance;
- Winzenheimer Straße 12/14 – pair of semi-detached houses under influence of country house style and New Objectivity, 1911, architect Rudolf Frey;
- Winzenheimer Straße 15 – one-and-a-half-floor villalike house, sandstone-framed clinker brick building, 1900, architect Josef Pfeiffer;
- Winzenheimer Straße 16 – two-and-a-half-floor villa resembling a country house with odd-shaped roofscape, 1909/1910, architect Hermann Tesch;
- Winzenheimer Straße 23 – corner house; building typical of the time with hip roof, 1927/1928, architect Wolfgang Goecke;
- Winzenheimer Straße 25 – villa; one-floor building with hipped mansard roof, 1925, architect Richard Starig;
- Winzenheimer Straße 36 – villa; brick-framed building with hip roof, 1928, architect Max Weber (?);
- Zwingel – Zwingelbrücke, red sandstone mediaeval two-arch bridge across the Ellerbach lying between Zwingel and Lauergasse, 1277;
- Zwingel – 30 m-long stretch of wall of the sovereign area (Burgfrieden) fortification between the Zwingelbrücke and the Kauzenburg;
- At Zwingel 4 – barrel-vaulted cellar and skylight portal, marked 1755;
- Zwingel 5 – main building of the former Tesch Brewery; three-floor building with pitched roof and clad timber framing, marked 1830 and 1832, from the solid ground floor entrance to three vaulted cellars in the Schlossberg;
- Zwingel 9 – three-floor timber-frame house, partly plastered, on trapezoidal footprint, 1880, architect Jacob Kossmann;
- Graveyard of Honour, Lohrer Wald, in town's western woods (monumental zone) – for the fallen of the Second World War on the German War Graves Commission's behalf; slated outer wall with open entrance hall, Classicist and Heimatstil motifs, 1952/1953, architect Robert Tischler, Munich, short sandstone crosses on burial ground laid out like a park;
- Hargesheimer Landstraße, Gutleuthof (monumental zone) – house, partly timber-frame, hipped mansard roof, carriage hall, stable-commercial building, about 1800;
- Jewish graveyard, north of the Nahe towards Winzenheim (monumental zone) – funnel-shaped area laid out in 1661, expanded in 1919; on the northern, oldest part, mostly Baroque sandstone slabs, on the narrow burial ground south of the mortuary chapel (mid 19th century, expanded in 1894) sandstone slabs from the 19th century; Baroque Revival marble tablets from the destroyed synagogue;
- Schloss Rheingrafenstein – long building with a hip roof, marked 1722, side building 19th century, in the gateway arch an armorial stone of the family Salm.

==== Bosenheim ====
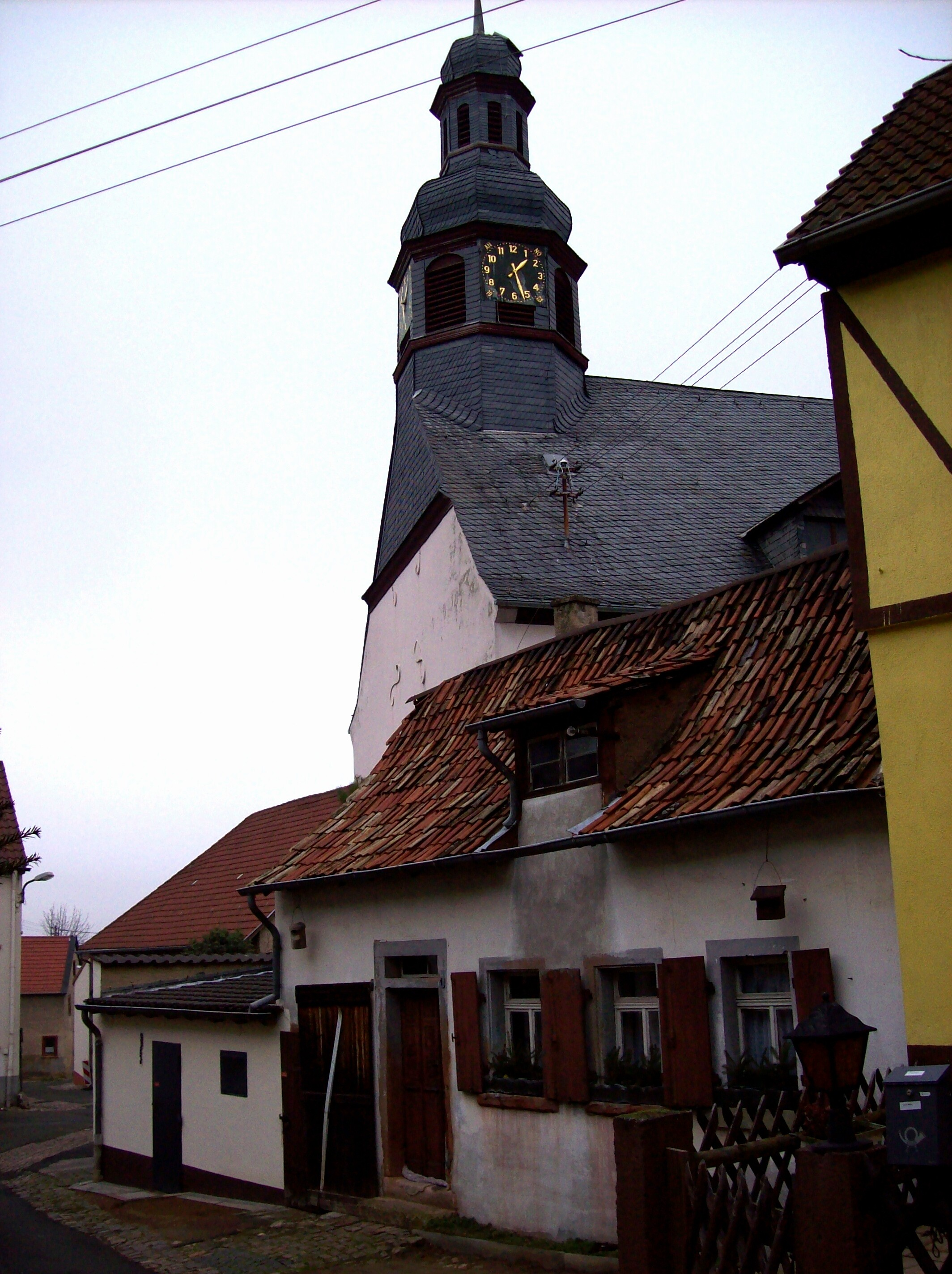
Karl-Sack-Straße 4 – Evangelical parish church

- Protestant parish church, Karl-Sack-Straße 4 – quire 14th century, aisleless church with ridge turret, 1744; characterises street's appearance;
- Friedhofsweg 1 – Altes Schulhaus ("Old Schoolhouse"), one-floor plastered building, 1897;
- Hackenheimer Straße 2 – three-sided estate; house, partly timber-frame, 1929 and older, barn door lintel marked 1567; characterises village's appearance;
- Hackenheimer Straße 6 – schoolhouse, representative building with hip roof, 1909;
- Karl-Sack-Straße 2 – Evangelical rectory, Historicized plastered building, late 19th century; characterises the street's appearance;
- Karl-Sack-Straße 3 – Renaissance building, partly timber-frame (plastered), marked 1617;
- Parkstraße 2 – estate of the winegrowing family Görz, hook-shaped estate; dwelling wing with barn, one-floor quarrystone building, 1826, administrator's house, partly shingled, 1927;
- Rheinhessenstraße 35 – three-sided estate; house, partly timber-frame (plastered), marked 1835;
- Rheinhessenstraße 43 – Baroque building with half-hip roof, partly timber-frame (plastered), 18th century;
- Rheinhessenstraße 54 – house, partly timber-frame, Renaissance double window, marked 1587;
- Rheinhessenstraße 58 – Baroque house, partly timber-frame, 18th century;
- Rheinhessenstraße 65 – three-sided estate, essentially possibly from the late 18th century; barn and house, partly timber-frame, stable building;
- Rheinhessenstraße 68 – former village hall, building with half-hip roof, 1732, expansion marked 1937;
- Rheinhessenstraße 78 – house, partly timber-frame, 18th century.

==== Ippesheim ====
- Protestant Christ Church (Christuskirche), Frankfurter Straße 2 – two-floor aisleless church, small-block wallwork, 1892, architect C. Schwartze, Darmstadt;
- Ernst-Ludwig-Straße 1 – corner house, brick building, 1891, one-floor commercial building, 1888;
- Ernst-Ludwig-Straße 4 – house, partly timber-frame, 18th century;
- Ernst-Ludwig-Straße 13 – house, partly timber-frame (partly plastered), 18th century;
- Falkensteinstraße 1 – corner house, partly timber-frame (partly plastered), possibly from the late 18th century, former barn, about 1900;
- Frankfurter Straße 8 – one-and-a-half-floor house, yellow-brick building, shortly after 1900.

==== Planig ====
- Protestant parish church, Am Ehrenmal 4 – late mediaeval plastered building, quire 1492, main space 1507; tower possibly high mediaeval, uppermost floor and spire 1818, architect Friedrich Schneider; furnishings;
- Saint Gordianus's Catholic Parish Church (Pfarrkirche St. Gordianus), Biebelsheimer Straße 4 – three-naved Romanesque pseudobasilica, quarrystone building, 1899/1900, architect Ludwig Becker; furnishings; characterises village's appearance;
- Village core, Kirchwinkelstraße and Dorfbrunnenstraße, Heinrich-Kreuz-Straße, Zentbrückenstraße, Dalbergstraße (monumental zone) – closed historical construction of village-like character up to the 19th century, including the late mediaeval Evangelical parish church, the Apfelsbach and the mixed gardens; mostly one-and-a-half-floor dwelling or estate houses, estate complexes of various types and sizes with a ring of barns;
- Biebelsheimer Straße/corner of Winzerkeller – Heiligenhäuschen (a small, shrinelike structure consecrated to a saint or saints), yellow-brick building with crow-stepped gables, 1892;
- Mainzer Straße 55 – house, Baroque building with half-hip roof, partly timber-frame;
- Mainzer Straße 63 – house, sandstone-framed brick building, 1900;
- Mainzer Straße 85 – Baroque barn with half-hip roof, 18th century;
- Mainzer Straße 87 – house, Baroque building with half-hip roof;
- Rheinpfalzstraße 15 – villa, hewn-stone-framed brick building, Renaissance Revival motifs, 1899;
- Jewish graveyard, on the northern town limit, Frenzenberg (monumental zone) – area with 13 gravestones from the 18th and late 19th centuries laid out no later than the 18th century, planted all round with hedges.

==== Winzenheim ====
- Luke's Protestant church (Lukaskirche), Hintere Grabenstraße 8 – Classicist aisleless church, 1833/1834, architect Ludwig Behr;
- Saint Peter's Catholic Church (Kirche St. Peter), Kirchstraße – high altar, about 1770, Late Gothic baptismal font, about 1500;
- Kirchstraße 1 – so-called Hofgut Zweifel ("Doubt Estate"); Baroque estate complex, 1772; wings with hip roofs, one-floor cross-wing, gateway with coat of arms.

=== Tourist attractions ===
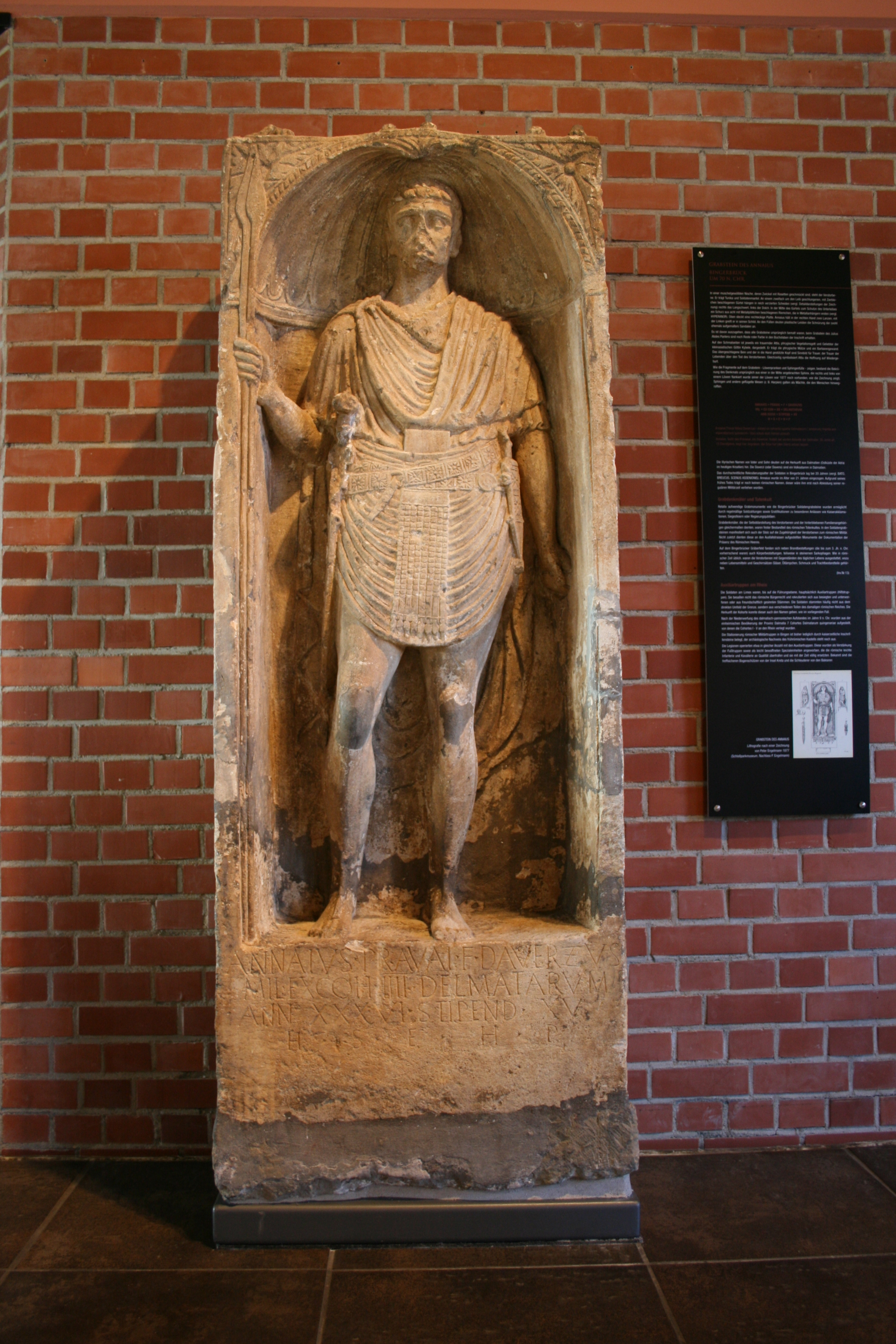
Gravestone of Annaius Daverzus in the Römerhalle museum, discovered during the construction of Bingen (Rhein) Hauptbahnhof in 1860

The town of Bad Kreuznach is home to the following tourist attractions:

- The Alte Nahebrücke, a bridge that crosses the River Nahe in central Bad Kreuznach along the Walkplatz, dates from around 1300. It supports houses built from 1582 to 1612, and it is one of the few remaining bridges with buildings on it.;
- The Pauluskirche (St. Paul's Church), where Karl Marx was married to Jenny von Westphalen on 19 June 1843.;
- The Kurhaus (built in 1913) is a hotel and bath house. The baths which give the town its special designation contain the noble gas radon, with supposedly curative properties;
- The Dr-Faust-Haus (built in 1507) was the home of Johann Georg Faust, the alchemist on whom the Faust tale is said to be based;
- Two mosaics from a Roman villa (about AD 250) are displayed in an on-site museum, the Römerhalle. The tombstone of Tiberius Julius Abdes Pantera is also on view here;
- Bad Kreuznach's wine is well known;
- For 50 years Kreuznach was home to a United States Army base, Rose Barracks, including headquarters of the U.S. 8th Infantry Division, including the 8th Signal Battalion, and the 8th Intelligence Co., and later the U.S. 1st Armored Division, which closed down in May 2001.
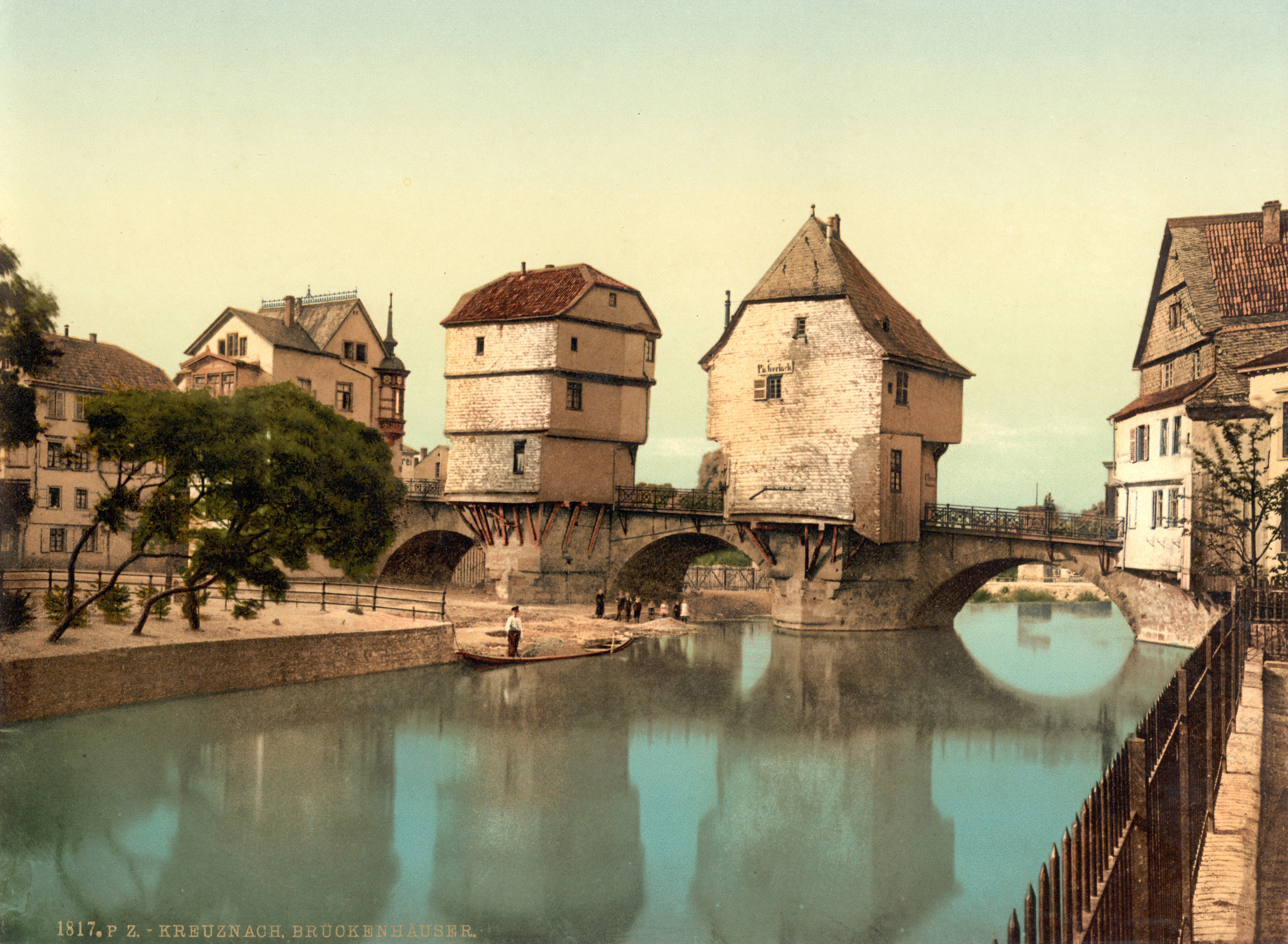
Nahe bridge houses between 1890 and 1905

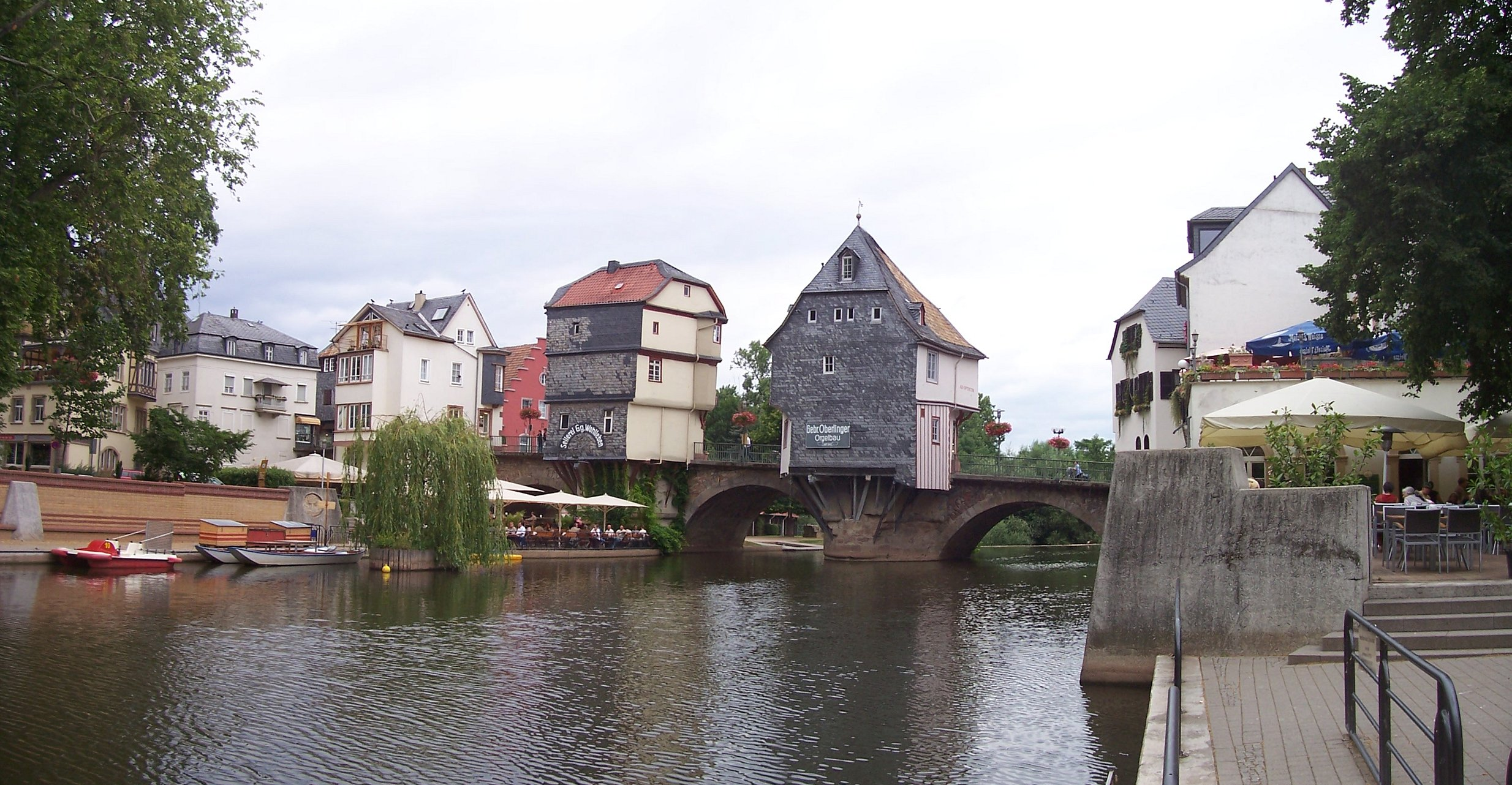
Nahe bridge houses in 2008

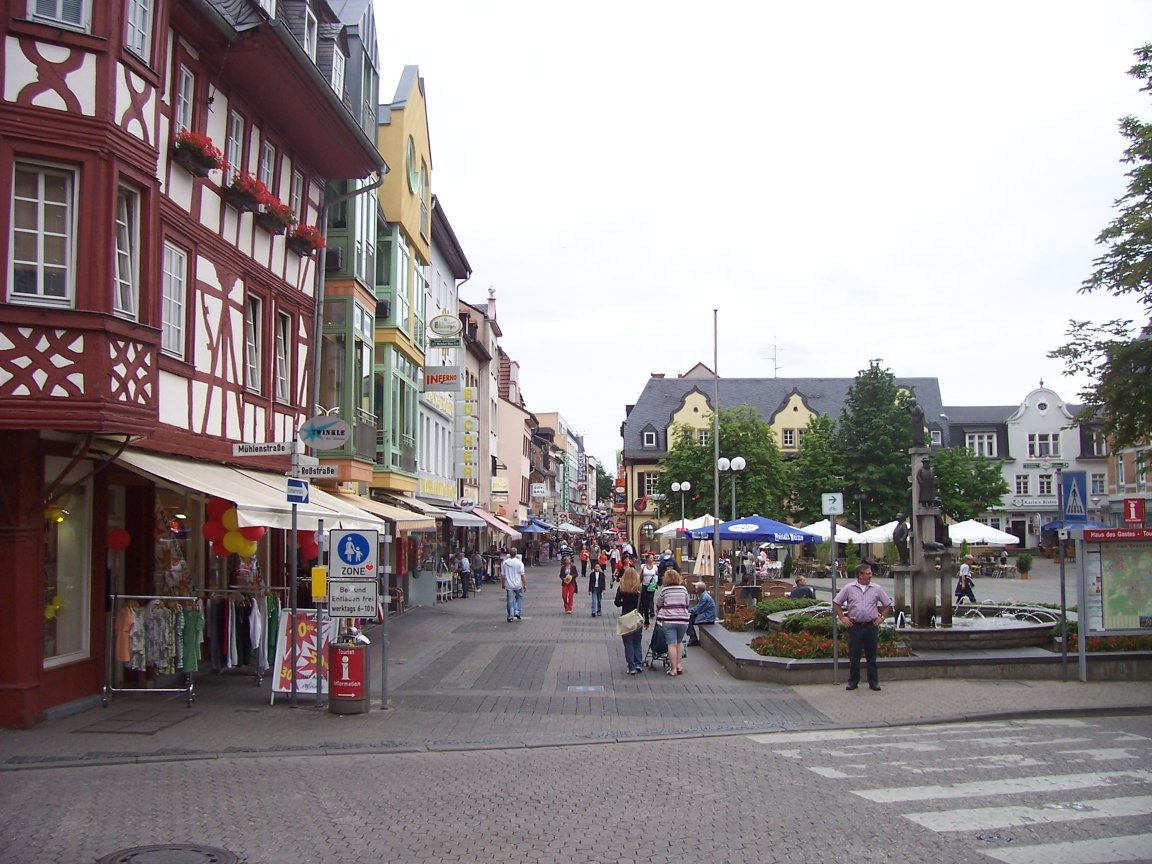
Mannheimerstraße

=== Music clubs and choirs ===
- Capella Nicolai
- Chor Cantamus
- Chor Mosaik
- Chor Reinhard – newly founded men's Christian choir
- Gospelchor Grenzenlos – "Borderless" Gospel choir
- Kantorei der Pauluskirche – Paul's Protestant Church choir
- Konzertgesellschaft Bad Kreuznach – concert company
- Kreuznacher-Diakonie-Kantorei – diaconal choir
- MC Harmonie 1845 Planig e.V.
- Musikverein "Musikfreunde Winzenheim" e. V. – "Winzenheim Friends of Music"
- Pop- und Gospelchor ReJOYSing, Planig.

=== Regular events ===
- Weekly market (Wochenmarkt) at the Kornmarkt: Tuesday and Friday, 0700 to 1300
- Altweiberfastnacht ("Old Women's Carnival") in the Narrenkäfig ("Fools' Cage") at the Kornmarkt: Thursday before Ash Wednesday
- Kreuznacher Narrenfahrt ("Kreuznach Fools' Journey"): Saturday before Ash Wednesday
- Nahetal-Turnier, junior football tournament: at Whitsun from Friday to Monday.
- Drachenfest auf dem Kuhberg ("Dragon Festival on the Kuhberg"): mid to late April
- Kreuznacher Hockey Club International Easter Hockey Tournament
- Automobilsalon: biggest automobile exhibition in Rhineland-Palatinate, last weekend in April
- Eiermarktfest ("Egg Market Festival"): mid July
- Kreuznacher Jahrmarkt ("Yearly Market"): (since 1810) third weekend in August (Friday to Tuesday)
- Fischerstechen ("Water Jousting"): first weekend in September
- RKV (Rowing and Canoeing Club) Herbst-Kanuslalom ("Autumn Canoe Slalom") in the Salinental: last weekend in September
- Nikolausmarkt ("Saint Nicholas's Market"): until 2008 always at the Eiermarkt ("Egg Market"), future still unclear
- Festival "marionettissimo"/Die Kunst des Spiels am Faden ("The Art of Playing on the Thread") in November at the Museum für PuppentheaterKultur
- Französischer Markt ("French Market"): once a year, dealers from the French partner town Bourg-en-Bresse hold a "French market" at the Kornmarkt; last held in 2007.

=== Town of Bad Kreuznach Cultural Prize ===
The Kulturpreis der Stadt Bad Kreuznach is a promotional prize awarded by the town of Bad Kreuznach each year in the categories of music, visual arts and literature on a rotational basis. A full list of prizewinners since the award's introduction can be seen at the link. In 2013, the prize was not awarded owing to cost-cutting measures.

=== Sport and leisure ===
==== Sport clubs ====
In Bad Kreuznach, there are many clubs that can boast of successes at the national level. In trampolining and whitewater slalom, the town is a national stronghold, while it has also shown strength at the state level in shooting sports and bocce. The biggest club is VfL 1848 Bad Kreuznach, within which the first basketball department in any sport club in Germany was founded in 1935. After the World War II, too, the club produced many important personalities, among them several players at the national level. Moreover, the club's field hockey department is also of importance, having for a while been represented in the Damen-Bundesliga ("Ladies' National League"). The first field hockey department in a Bad Kreuznach sports club, however, was the Kreuznacher HC, which made it to the semi-finals at the German Championship in 1960, and which to this day stages the Easter Hockey Tournament. In football, the town's most successful club is Eintracht Bad Kreuznach. The team played in, among other leagues, the Oberliga, when that was Germany's highest level in football, as well as, later, the Second Bundesliga. The club that has won the most titles is MTV Bad Kreuznach, which, in trampolining, is among Germany's most successful clubs. Canoeing, in particular whitewater slalom, is practised by RKV Bad Kreuznach. Creuznacher RV has a long tradition in rowing. Also important are the shooting sport clubs SG Bad Kreuznach 1847 and BSC Bad Kreuznach. In disabled sports, the Sportfreunde Diakonie has been especially successful, particularly in bocce.

==== Town of Bad Kreuznach Sport Badge ====
The Sportplakette der Stadt Bad Kreuznach is an honour awarded by the town once each year to individual sportsmen or sportswomen, whole teams, worthy promoters of sports and worthy people whose jobs are linked to sports. With this award, the town also hopes to underscore its image as a sporting town in Rhineland-Palatinate. The Sport Badge is conferred upon sportsmen or sportswomen at three levels:

- Gold
  - Participation in a world championship or the Olympic Games
  - World Cup ranking 1st to 3rd place
  - 1st to 3rd place at European championships
- Silver
  - World Cup ranking 4th or 5th place
  - European championships 4th or 5th place
  - 1st place at German championships
- Bronze
  - World Cup ranking 6th or 7th place
  - Participation in a European championship
  - 2nd or 3rd place at a German championship

A promoter or person working in a sport-related field must be active in an unpaid capacity for at least 25 years to receive this award.

== Economy and infrastructure ==
=== Winegrowing ===
Bad Kreuznach is characterised to a considerable extent by winegrowing, and with 777 ha of vineyard planted – 77% white wine varieties and 23% red – it is the biggest winegrowing centre in the Nahe wine region and the seventh biggest in Rhineland-Palatinate.

=== Industry and trade ===
Bad Kreuznach has roughly 1,600 businesses with at least one employee, thereby offering 28,000 jobs, of which half are filled by commuters who come into town from surrounding areas. The economic structure is thus characterised mainly by small and medium enterprises, but also some big businesses like the tire manufacturer Michelin, the machine builder KHS, the Meffert Farbwerke (dyes, lacquers, plasters, protective coatings) and the Jos. Schneider Optische Werke GmbH may be mentioned. In 2002, the tradition-rich Seitz-Filter-Werke was taken over by the US-based Pall Corporation. Thus, producing businesses are of great importance, and are especially well represented by the chemical industry (tires, lacquers, dyes) and the optical industry, as well as machine builders and automotive suppliers. Retail and wholesale dealers, as well as restaurants, hold particular weight in the inner town, although in the last few years, the service sector, too, has been gaining in importance. The express road links to the Autobahn bring Bad Kreuznach closer to Frankfurt Airport. The town can also attract new investment with its economic conversion areas.

=== Spa and tourism ===
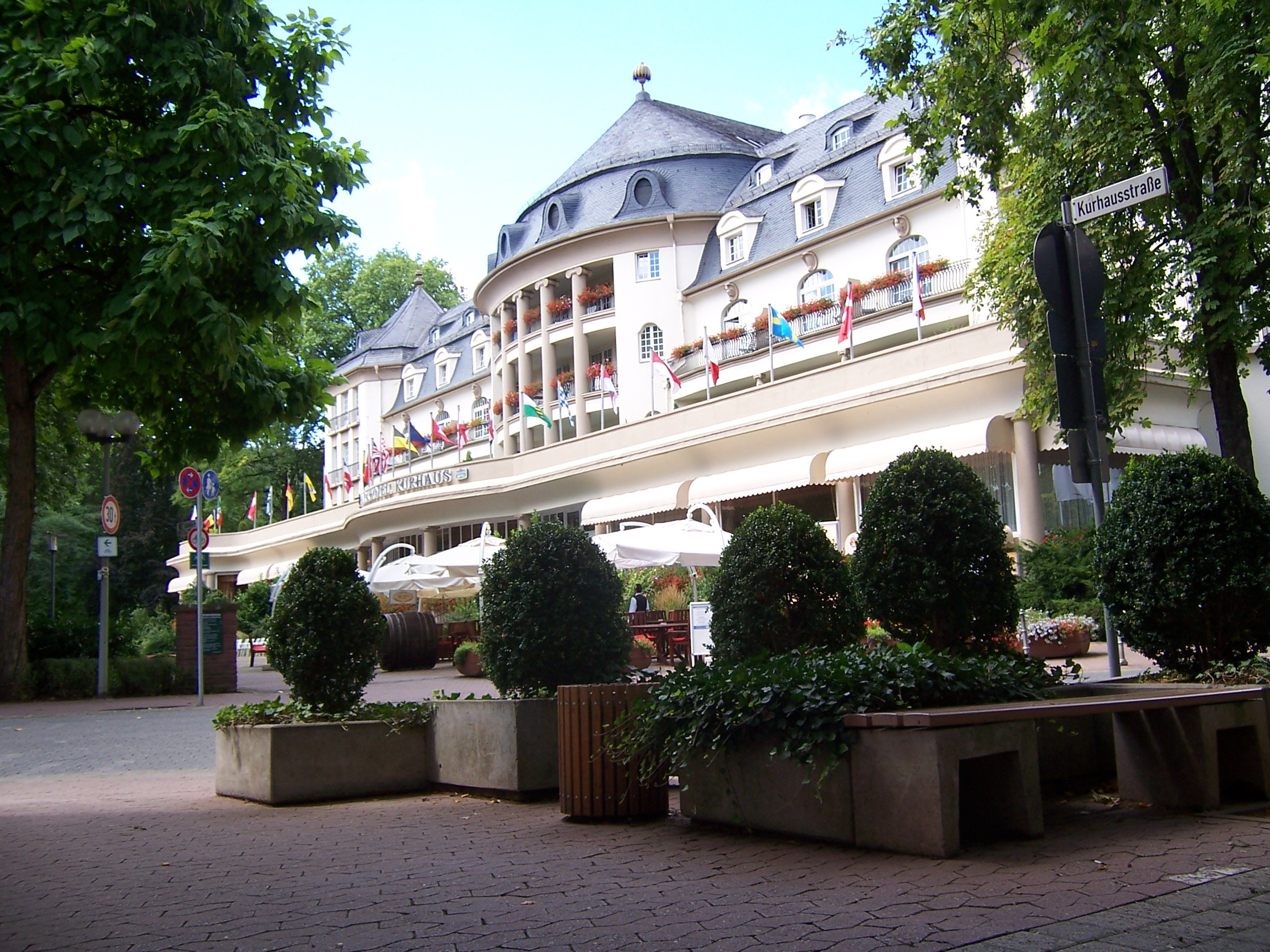
Parkhotel Kurhaus

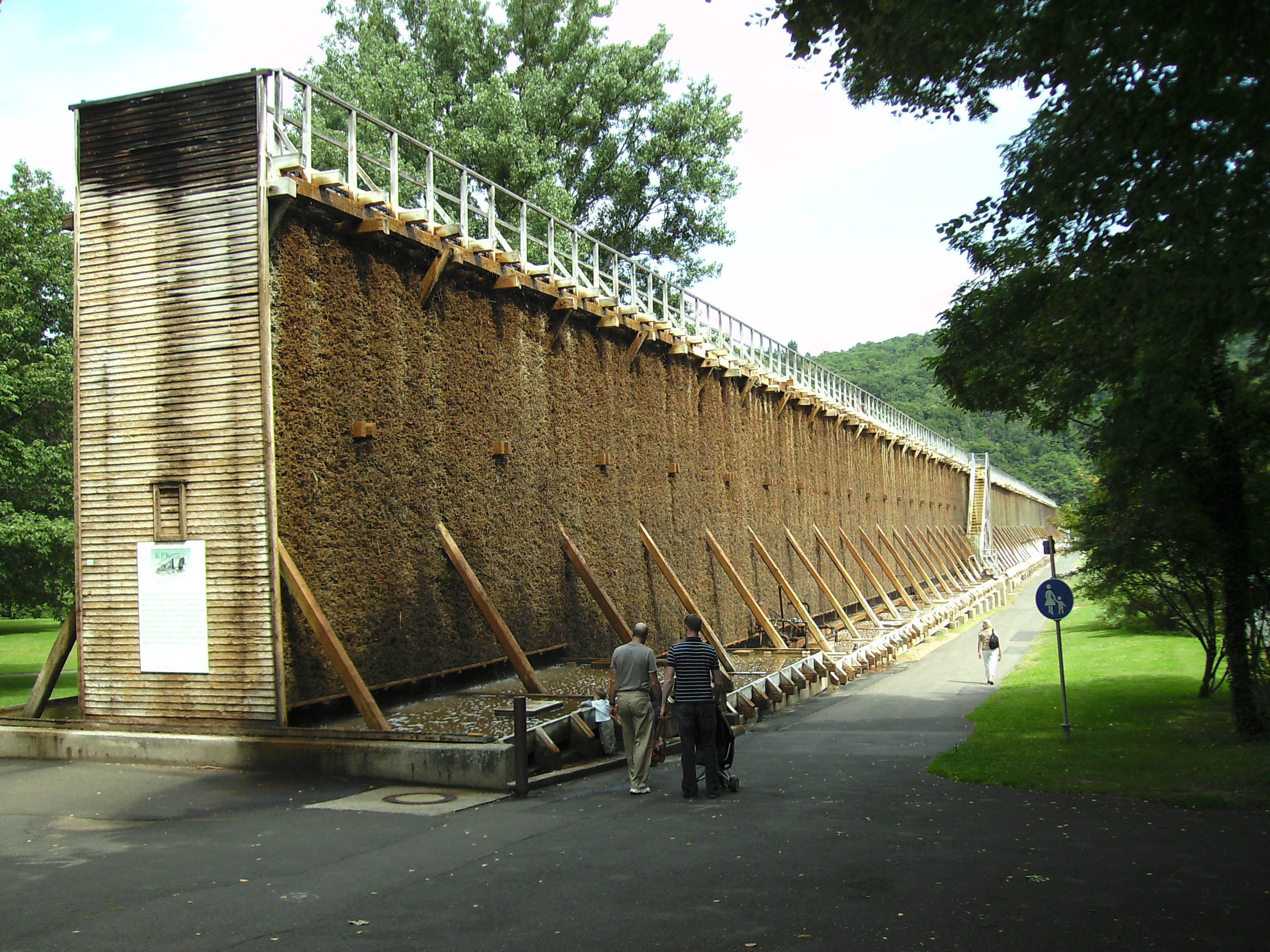
Graduation tower in the saltworks complex

The spa operations and the wellness tourism also hold a special place for the town as the world's oldest radon-brine spa and the Rhineland-Palatinate centre for rheumatic care. Available in town are 2,498* beds for guests, which out of 449,756* overnight stays have seen 270,306* stays by guests in rehabilitation clinics. All together, the town was visited by 92,700 overnight guests (*as of 31 December 2010). Also available to the spa operations are six spa clinics, spa sanatoria, the thermal brine movement bath "Crucenia Thermen" with a salt grotto, a radon gallery, graduation towers in the Salinental (dale), the brine-fogger in the Kurpark (spa park) set up as open-air inhalatoria and the "Crucenia Gesundheitszentrum" ("Crucenia Health Centre") for ambulatory spa treatment. The indications for these treatments are for rheumatic complaints, changes in joints due to gout, degenerative diseases of the spinal column and joints, women's complaints, illnesses of the respiratory system, paediatric illnesses, vascular illnesses, non-infectious skin diseases, endocrinological dysfunctions, psychosomatic illnesses and eye complaints. After the noticeable decline in the spa business in the mid 1990s, there was a remodelling of the healing spa. At the Saunalandschaft bathhouse rose a "wellness temple" with 12 great saunas on an area of 4 000 m2, which receives roughly 80,000 visitors every year.

=== Hospitals and specialised clinics ===
In the hospital run by kreuznacher diakonie (397 beds) and the St. Marienwörth hospital (Franciscan brothers), Bad Kreuznach has at its disposal two general hospitals that have available the most modern specialised departments for heart and intestinal disorders, and also strokes. In the spa zone, there is also the "Sana" Rhineland-Palatinate Rheumatic Centre, made up of a rheumatic hospital and a rehabilitation clinic, the Karl-Aschoff-Klinik. Another rehabilitation clinic under private sponsorship is the Klinik Nahetal. Also, there are the psychosomatic specialised clinic St.-Franziska-Stift and the rehabilitation and preventive clinic for children and youth, Viktoriastift.

=== Transport ===
Given Bad Kreuznach's location in the narrow Nahe valley, all transport corridors run upstream parallel to the river. Moreover, the town is an important crossing point for all modes of transport.

==== Rail ====
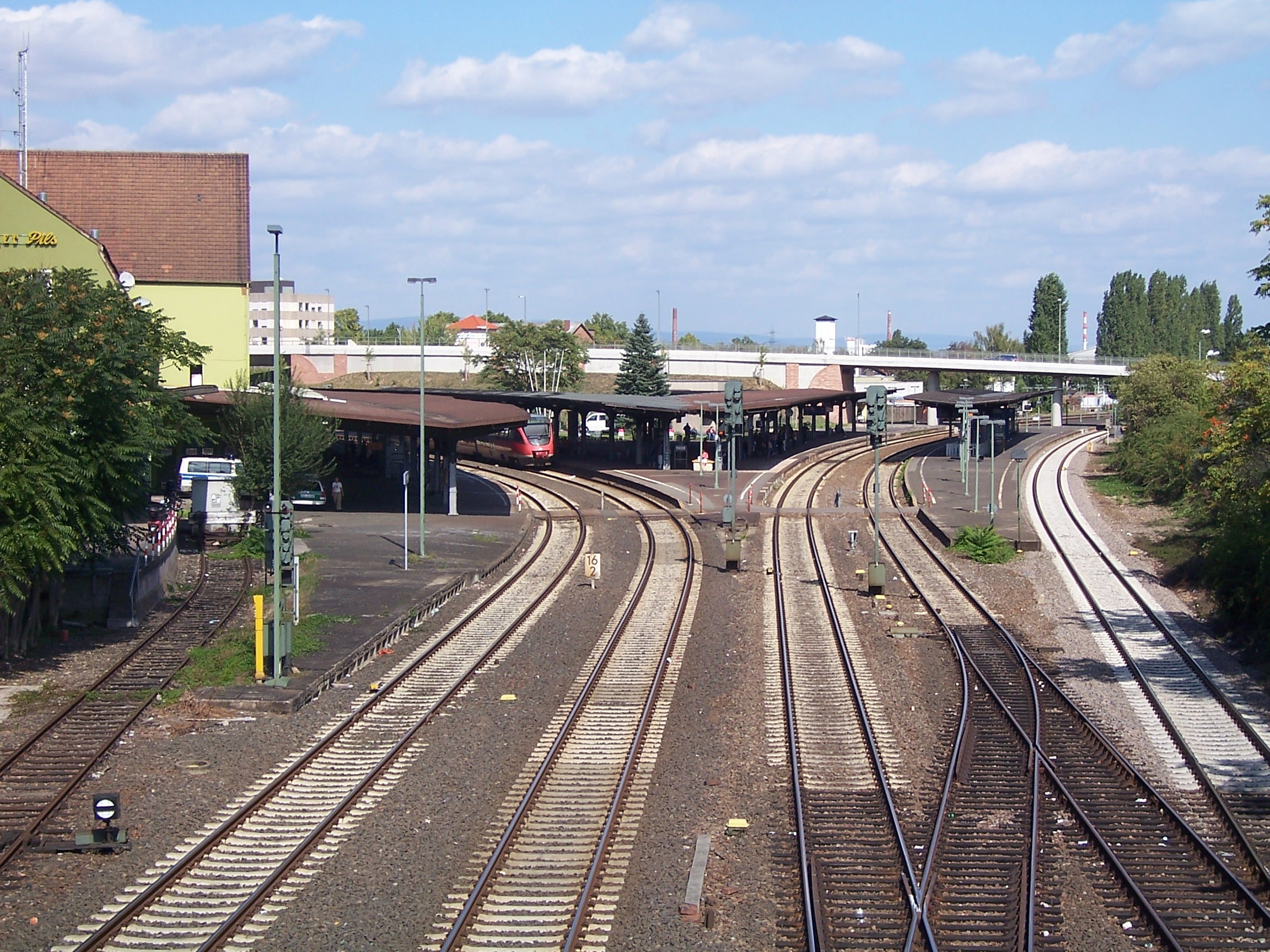
Fork in the tracks at the railway station

From 1896 to 1936, there were the Kreuznacher Kleinbahnen ("Kreuznach Narrow-Gauge Railways"), a rural narrow-gauge railway network. An original steam locomotive and its shed, which were moved from Winterburg, can be found today in nearby Bockenau. The Kreuznacher Straßen- und Vorortbahnen ("Kreuznach Tramways and Suburban Railways") ran not only a service within the town but also lines out into the surrounding area, to Bad Münster am Stein, Langenlonsheim and Sankt Johann. In 1953, the whole operation was shut down. Since the introduction of "Rhineland-Palatinate Timetabling" (Rheinland-Pfalz-Takt) in the mid 1990s, the train services other than the ICE/EC/IC services have once again earned some importance. Besides the introduction of hourly timetabling, there has also been a marked expansion into the nighttime hours, with trains leaving for Mainz three hours later each day. Bad Kreuznach station is one of Rhineland-Palatinate's few V-shaped stations (called a Keilbahnhof, or "wedge station", in the German terminology). Branching off the Nahe Valley Railway (Bingen–Saarbrücken) here is the railway line to Gau Algesheim. From Bingen am Rhein, Regionalbahn trains run by way of the Alsenz Valley Railway, which branches off the Nahe Valley Railway in Bad Münster am Stein, to Kaiserslautern, reaching it in roughly 65 minutes. Running on the line to Saarbrücken and by way of Gau Algesheim and the West Rhine Railway to Mainz are Regional-Express and Regionalbahn trains. The travel time to Mainz lies between 25 and 40 minutes, and to Saarbrücken between 1 hour and 40 minutes and 2 hours and 20 minutes.

==== Road ====
Bad Kreuznach can be reached by car through the like-named interchange on the Autobahn A 61 as well as on Bundesstraßen 41, 48 and 428. Except for Bundesstraße 48, all these roads skirt the inner town, while the Autobahn is roughly 12 km from the town centre. Local public transport is provided by a town bus network with services running at 15- or 30-minute intervals. There are seven bus routes run by Verkehrsgesellschaft Bad Kreuznach (VGK), which is owned by the company Rhenus Veniro. Furthermore, there is a great number of regional bus routes serving the nearby area, run by VGK and Omnibusverkehr Rhein-Nahe GmbH (ORN). The routes run by the various carriers are all part of the Rhein-Nahe-Nahverkehrsverbund ("Rhine-Nahe Local Transport Association").

=== Media ===
==== Broadcast ====
- Antenne Bad Kreuznach radio station;
- domradio Studio-Nahe UKW 87,9, clerical radio, domradio Köln repeater, local station on Saturday morning and church service broadcast on Sunday;
- Bürgerfernsehen Offener Kanal Bad Kreuznach, public access television channel.

==== Print media ====
- Allgemeine Zeitung Bad Kreuznach: daily newspaper for Bad Kreuznach and area, owned by Verlagsgruppe Rhein Main. circulation roughly 13,000;
- Oeffentlicher Anzeiger: daily newspaper for Bad Kreuznach and area, owned by Rhein-Zeitung (Mittelrhein-Verlag). circulation roughly 22,000;
- Concerned with town history: Bad Kreuznacher Heimatblätter, irregularly appearing insert in the Oeffentlichen Anzeiger;
- VorSicht – Das Rhein-Nahe-Journal. circulation 15,000;
- Lifetime: town magazine for Bad Kreuznach;
- Wochenspiegel Bad Kreuznach: weekly advertising flyer, owned by SW-Verlag;
- Kreuznacher Rundschau, until 1 October 2010: Neue Kreuznacher Zeitung: weekly advertising flyer. The first edition appeared in October 2006.

==== Online ====
- Kreuznach-Blog – current events and information about Bad Kreuznach from the region and the Internet. Since 1 June 2008;
- Extrawelle – news for Bad Kreuznach.

=== Education and research ===
Found in Bad Kreuznach are not only several primary schools, some of which offer "full-time school", but also secondary schools of all three types as well as vocational preparatory schools or combined vocational-academic schools such as Berufsfachschulen, Berufsoberfachschulen and Technikerschulen, which are housed at the vocational schools. The following schools are found in Bad Kreuznach:

==== Primary schools ====
- Dr. Martin-Luther-King-Schule ("full-time school");
- Grundschule Kleiststraße ("full-time school");
- Grundschule Hofgartenstraße;
- Grundschule Planig;
- Grundschule Winzenheim;
- Grundschule Bad Münster am Stein Ebernburg.

==== Hauptschulen ====
- Hauptschule Ringstraße (with 10th school year, "full-time school");
- Hauptschule am Römerkastell (with 10th school year).

==== Realschulen ====
- Realschule Heidenmauer ("full-time school").

==== Comprehensive schools ====
- IGS Bad Kreuznach ("full-time school").

==== Gymnasien ====
- Lina-Hilger-Gymnasium;
- Gymnasium an der Stadtmauer (with classical-language and mathematical-natural sciences branch);
- Gymnasium am Römerkastell (with bilingual branch);
- Berufliches Gymnasium Fachrichtung Wirtschaft (secondary level 2 only);
- Berufliches Gymnasium Fachrichtung Technik (secondary level 2 only);
- Höhere Berufsfachschule Polizeidienst und Verwaltung (Fachhochschulreife only).

==== Vocational training schools ====
- Berufsbildende Schule für Technik, Gewerbe, Hauswirtschaft, Sozialwesen;
- Berufsbildende Schule für Wirtschaft;
- Berufsbildende Schule Landwirtschaft;
- DEULA Rheinland-Pfalz GmbH Lehranstalt für Agrar- und Umwelttechnik.

==== Special schools ====
- Bethesda-Schule Schule für Körperbehinderte ("full-time school");
- Don-Bosco-Schule Schule für geistig Behinderte ("full-time school");
- Schule am Ellerbach Schule für Lernbehinderte ("full-time school").

In 1950, the Max Planck Institute for Agricultural and Agricultural Engineering was moved from Imbshausen to Bad Kreuznach, where it used spaces of the Bangert knightly estate. From 1956 until its closure in 1976, it bore the name Max-Planck-Institut für Landarbeit und Landtechnik. From 1971 to 1987, the discipline of cultivation of the Fachhochschule Rheinland-Pfalz, Bingen, was located in Bad Kreuznach. Since it moved away to Bingen, Bad Kreuznach has been offering collegelike training for aspirant winemakers and agricultural technologists with the DLR (Dienstleistungszentrum Ländlicher Raum). This two-year Technikerschule für Weinbau und Oenologie sowie Landbau is a path within the agricultural economics college. It continues the tradition of the former, well known Höheren Weinbauschule ("Higher Winegrowing School") and the Ingenieurschule für Landbau ("Engineering School for Cultivation") and fills a gap in the training between Fachhochschule and one-year Fachschule. The Agentur für Qualitätssicherung, Evaluation und Selbstständigkeit von Schulen ("Agency for Quality Assurance, Evaluation and Independence of Schools") and the Pädagogisches Zentrum Rheinland-Pfalz ("Rhineland-Palatinate Paedagogical Centre"), the latter of which the state's schools support with their further paedagogical and didactic development, likewise have their seats in the town, as does the Staatliche Studienseminar Bad Kreuznach (a higher teachers' college). The Evangelical Church in the Rhineland maintained from 1960 to 2003 a seminary in Bad Kreuznach to train vicars.

== Notable people ==
=== Honorary citizens ===
Thus far, 18 persons have been named honorary citizens of the town of Bad Kreuznach. Three of those have been stripped of the honour: Adolf Hitler, Wilhelm Frick and Richard Walther Darré. The fifteen remaining honorary citizens are listed here with the date of the honour in parentheses:

- Otto von Bismarck (1895)
- Berthold von Nasse (1901)
- Otto Agricola (1902)
- Jean Winckler (1904)
- Otto Hersing (1915)
- Paul von Hindenburg (1918)
- Erich Ludendorff (1918)
- Franz Ernst Potthoff (1924)
- Joseph Schneider, entrepreneur (1928)
- Werner Forßmann (1957), Nobel Prize in Medicine 1956
- Hans Staab, owner of a large magazine distribution company, a foundation named after him (1996)
- Alex Jacob, hotel owner, socially engaged honorary consul general for Romania (2008)
- Hans Jöckel, spa and health resort medic, health counsellor (2020)
- André Borsche (2024)
- Eva Eisenhardt-Borsche (2024).

=== Sons and daughters of the town ===
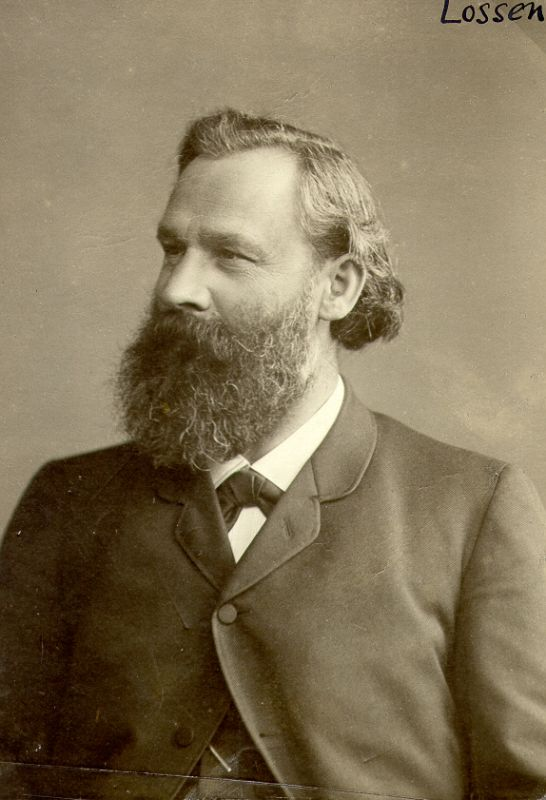
Karl August Lossen

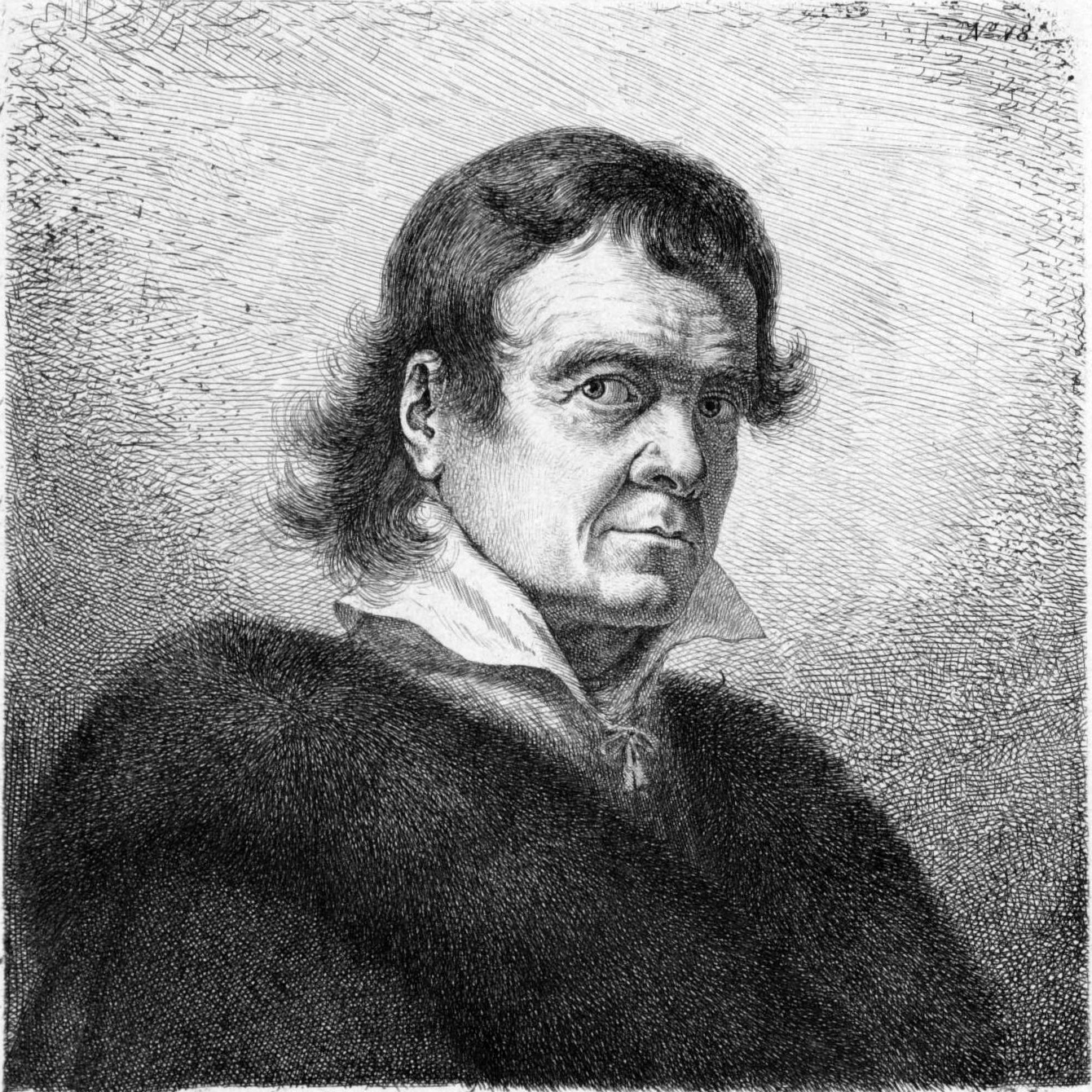
Friedrich Müller

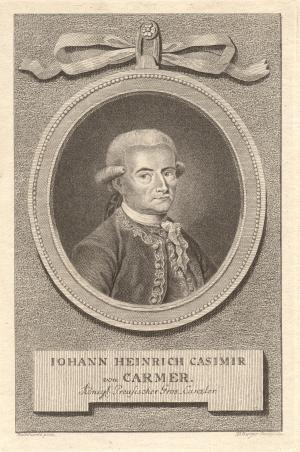
Johann Heinrich von Carmer

- Konrad von Kreuznach (d. 13 October 1368 in Mainz), lyricist (minstrel) and musician
- Nikolaus von Kreuznach (c. 1430 – 1491), jurist, theologian and rector of the University of Vienna
- Johannes Philippi "Alemanus" de Butzbach aus Kreuznach (de Critznach) (before 1460 – c. 1519), "sworn" printer active in Toulouse and Paris, there partner of Georg Wolff from Baden in Baden
- Conrad Faber von Kreuznach (c. 1500 – c. 1552), German painter and draughtsman
- Johann Heinrich von Carmer (1721–1801), Prussian grand chancellor and justice reformer
- Friedrich Müller (1749–1825), pseudonym: Nasturtius, German poet and painter
- Franz Christoph Braun (1766–1833), clergyman and government representative
- Carl Löwig (1803–1890), chemist
- Eberhard Anheuser (1805–1880), entrepreneur, owner of the major brewery Anheuser-Busch
- Wilhelm Lossen (1838–1906), chemist
- Karl August Lossen (1841–1894), geologist
- Erich Prieger (1849–1913), musicologist
- Arthur Quassowski (1858–1943), lieutenant general
- Hella O'Cuire Quirke (1866–1944), writer
- Ludwig Cauer (1866–1947), sculptor
- Stanislaus Cauer (1867–1943), sculptor and college instructor
- Hans Driesch (1867–1941), biologist and natural philosopher
- Alexe Altenkirch (1871–1943), painter, designer and artistic educator
- Friedrich Karl Johann Vaupel (1876–1927), botanist
- Nelli Schmithals (1880–1975), photographer
- Hugo Rothenberg (1882-1948), Jewish businessman and friend of Hermann Göring
- Karl Sack (1896–1945), jurist and resistance fighter
- Lothar Steuer (1893–1957), lawyer and politician
- Herbert Eimert (1897–1972), composer
- Hanna Cauer (1902–1989), sculptor and painter
- Hugo Salzmann (1903–1979), Communist and Antifascist
- Edmund Collein (1906–1992), architect
- Konrad Frey (1909–1974), gymnast
- Eberhard Au (1921–1996), engineer, co-inventor of the Dahlbusch Bomb
- Hans Schumm (1927–2007), district chairman
- Albrecht Martin (1927–2014), educator and politician
- Heijo Hangen (1927–2019), constructivist artist and documenta participant
- Elmar Pieroth (1934–2018), German politician (CDU).
- Ursula Hill-Samelson (1935–2013), mathematician and computer science pioneer
- Rudolf Wohlleben (born 1936), engineering scientist, writer and student historian
- Manfred Ströher (born 1937), basketball functionary
- Peter Anheuser (1938–2016), winegrower and politician (CDU)
- Wolfgang Bötsch (1938–2017), politician (CSU)
- Hans Maria Mole (1940–2021), painter and actionist artist
- Gerhard Bahrenberg (1943–2022), geographer
- Hans-Robert Lichtenberg (born 1943), celebrity
- Hein-Direck Neu (1944–2017), discus thrower
- Volker Pudel (1944–2009), nutritional psychologist
- Günter Verheugen (born 1944), politician (SPD, before that FDP)
- Ulrich Birkenheier (born 1949), Chairman of the Militärischer Abschirmdienst
- Udo van Kampen (born 1949), journalist
- Wolfgang Donsbach (1949–2015), communication scientist
- Andreas Höfele (born 1950), Anglist and writer
- Armin Emrich (born 1951), handball trainer
- Wolfgang Schömel (born 1952), author
- Horst Klee (born 1952), guitarist and musical educator
- Hans-Werner Wagner (1952–1998), state secretary (CDU)
- Lee Charm (born 1954), Chairman of the National Tourism Authority of South Korea
- Holger Härter (born 1956), manager
- Yaacov Lozowick (born 1957), philosopher and educator
- Sabine Hassinger (born 1958), author
- Helmut Freitag (born 1960), university music director
- Ise Thomas (born 1960), politician (Alliance '90/The Greens)
- Karl Christoph Klauer (born 1961), cognitional psychologist and professor
- Peter Eich (born 1963), football goalkeeper
- Hans-Peter Burghof (born 1963), economist
- Marcus Birkenkrahe (born 1963), physicist, information architect and executive coach
- Melitta Sundström/Thomas Gerards (1964–1993); entertainment and travesti artist
- Aiman Abdallah (born 1965), television moderator
- Karsten Thormaehlen (born 1965), photographer, editor and curator
- Petra Erdtmann (born 1967), flautist
- Gregor Beyer (born 1968), politician (FDP)
- Katharina Saalfrank (born 1971), diplomaed educator and columnist
- Andreas Fischer-Lescano (born 1972), expert in jurisprudence and professor
- Michael Senft (born 1972), canoeist
- Julia Klöckner (born 1972), politician (CDU) and as President of the German Bundestag since 25 March 2025.
- Siegfried Kärcher (born 1974), visual artist
- Thomas Reichenberger (born 1974), footballer
- Thomas Schmidt (born 1976), canoeist
- Alexander Graeff (born 1976), writer
- Manuel Friedrich (born 1979), footballer
- Niklas Meinert (born 1981), field hockey player
- Tine Fetz (born 1984), illustrator
- Jens Werrmann (born 1985), hurdler
- Benjamin Kessel (born 1987), footballer
- Matthias de Zordo (born 1988), javelin thrower
- Pierre Merkel (born 1989), footballer.

=== Famous personalities ===
- Marie von Oranien-Nassau (1642–1688), widow of Pfalzgraf Louis Henry, Count Palatine of Simmern-Kaiserslautern (1640–1674), remodelled the abandoned Augustinian convent of Saint Peter into the "Oranienhof"
- Friedrich Christian Laukhard (1757–1822), theologian and political writer (spent his last years here)
- Emil Cauer the Elder (1800–1867), sculptor
- Prince Carl of Solms-Braunfels (1812–1875), called "Texas-Carl", buried at the Bad Kreuznach town graveyard
- Robert Cauer the Elder (1831–1893), sculptor, son of Emil Cauer the Elder and brother of Karl Cauer
- Hermann Niebuhr (1904–1968), basketball pioneer in Germany
- Werner Forßmann (1904–1979), cardiologist, Nobel laureat
- Dieter Wellmann (born 1923), church musician at Paul's Protestant Church (Pauluskirche) from 1960 to 1996
- Helmut Kickton (born 1956), cantor of the kreuznacher diakonie
- Anna Dogonadze (born 1973), German-Georgian Olympic champion in trampolining
- Jean Mannheim (1862–1945), California Impressionist painter and educator, born in Bad Kreuznach.
- Yann Peifer DJ of Cascada (born 1974), known by his stage name Yanou

== Sundry ==
- In Eisenach, the well-to-do salesman and patrician Conrad Creutznacher had the later so-called Kreuznacher Haus (or Creuznacherhaus) built in the Renaissance style next to Saint George's Church (Georgenkirche) in 1507/1539. In the early 17th century, this was integrated into the residential palace (today Markt 9);
- In Daniel Defoe's novel Robinson Crusoe, which came out in 1719, the title character tells the reader that his mother's family originally bore the name "Kreutznaer" and had emigrated to England by way of Bremen. Since then, the surname Crusoe has been taken to be a corruption of the word Kreuznacher ("person from Kreuznach"). In 1720, at first anonymously, Defoe's novel Memoirs of a Cavalier appeared, in which receipts from "Creutznach" are described.;
- Marcel Proust visited the town with his mother in 1895;
- Bad Kreuznach is known among photographers as the home of Schneider Optische Werke, a famous photographic lens maker.

== See also ==
- Kreuznach Conference (7 October 1917)
