= The Good Neighbor (2022 film) =

- Promotional poster
- Directed by: Stephan Rick
- Written by: Stephan Rick; Ross Partridge
- Based on: Unter Nachbarn by Stephan Rick and Silja Clemens
- Produced by: Dean Altit; Yulia Zayceva
- Starring: Jonathan Rhys Meyers; Luke Kleintank; Eloise Smyth; Bruce Davison
- Cinematography: Stefan Ciupek
- Edited by: Robert K. Lambert
- Music by: Enis Rotthoff
- Distributed by: Screen Media
- Release date: June 17, 2022
- Running time: 105 minutes
- Countries: United States; Latvia
- Languages: English; Latvian

The Good Neighbor is a 2022 mystery crime thriller film written by Stephan Rick and Ross Partridge, directed by Rick and starring Jonathan Rhys Meyers, Luke Kleintank, Eloise Smyth and Bruce Davison. It is a remake of Rick’s 2011 German film of the same name.

The Good Neighbour was a joint American-Latvian production and was given a limited cinema release in June 2022, before steaming on VOD. The film attracted mixed reviews, with criticism for plausibility but also praise for suspense.

== Plot ==
After a bad relationship break-up, American journalist David Stevens arrives in Riga, Latvia to begin a new job at the “European Press Network”. David's editor Grant gives him the use of a house on the outskirts of Riga while an apartment in the city is being prepared for him. Grant also tells David that as he is new, he will initially be given the journalistic assignments that no-one else wants. At the office, Grant tries to fix David up with an attractive, mature fellow journalist, Alice. Back at the house when David has trouble starting the car Grant has left for him, an old BMW 7 Series, he enlists the help of his neighbour, Robert, a friendly but eccentric mobile male nurse, who tells David he has a British mother. The two go for a night-time drive around Riga together.

David settles into his new job at the press network. He shows little interest in pursuing a relationship with Alice, instead wanting to go out drinking, exploring Riga as a single man. On Thursday, his editor Grant politely declines a proposal from David to go out drinking, leaving David bored and lonely in the evening. After noticing Robert watching the same television programme as him, about ants, through the window, he goes round and asks Robert to come out for some drinks with him. The two go out to a club in Riga and David meets a girl, Janine, from London, who tells him she is a cyclist. The two drink together, flirt, and dance. Robert sees this, and looks on disapprovingly. Janine writes her phone number on David's arm before leaving the club, with David calling her immediately. David and Robert stay on at the club for a while before, both drunk, driving home, with David at the wheel. As they drive down a lane, David is distracted at the wheel and hits a woman riding a bike. Upon exiting the car David sees that the woman is Janine. David wants to call emergency services, however Robert tells him that the woman is dead and convinces him to get in the car and drive home, which they do.

David struggles in the aftermath of Janine's killing, first planning to flee Latvia, then wanting to confess to the police. Robert however is calm, making him agree to a pact to cover up their crime, using the alibi that they travelled back from the club by tram. Robert takes actions to cover their crime, including disposing of the BMW, as David continues to struggle with guilt, exacerbated when he is assigned, as a journalist, to cover the case. Janine's sister, Vanessa, sees David at a press conference about her sister's death, and sets about striking up a relationship with him. David is initlaly reluctant, agreeing only when he sees that Vanessa is completely alone, giving him a chance for redemption, and also realising that he can use her inside information into the police investigation into Janine's killing for his own benefit. David's friendship with Robert, a keen fisherman, initlaly develops, with Robert taking David fishing at a nearby lake; David catches a fish which the two of them cook and eat for dinner. Robert's strange, obsessive behaviour, however, including spying on David from his window, which David sees, gives David cause for concern and desire to keep a distance from him.

Receiving a tip from Vanessa that police have found a eye-witness of Janine's killing, David informs Robert, who recognises the witness is one of his patients and, without telling David, kills her with an injection before she can speak to the police. David starts to priorities his blossoming relationship with Vanessa over his frienship with Robert. When David cancels an arranged meet-up with Robert to go on a date with Vanessa, Robert is enraged, damaging David's rental car and stalking Vanessa to her home. Robert then spies on the two from his home as Vanessa comes to stay at David's place. Robert, jealous of David's relationship with Vanessa, orders him to break off contact with her telling him she will inevitably expose them, however David cannot do this. Vanessa for her part is lonely in Latvia and is both attracted to David and sees in him someone who can help her own amateur investigation into what happened to her sister.

As David and Vanessa's relationship develops, David's deceit begins to cause increasing problems for him. Grant wants to use the BMW, and David has to make up a story as to why it is unavailable. Due to stress, David's performance starts slipping at work. Alerted by the police, and with suspicions that something with David is amiss, Grant comes to David's house to ascertain what has happened to the BMW. Finding the BMW missing from the garage, Grant is surprised by Robert, who kills him, disposing of his body in the lake he disposed of the BMW. Robert then ambushes David and Vanessa when they go kayaking on a lake, chasing Vanessa until her kayak capsizes and she is thrown into the water, almost drowning. After this, David has a heated verbal row with Robert, telling him to leave them alone, and terminating their friendship. David and Vanessa return from their kayaking trip to find the police have come to question David about his relationship with Janine, having discovered that he called her phone on the night of the hit-and-run. Vanessa is present, and starts to suspect that David is involved in her sister's death, unable to believe David's explanation that he didn't know it was Janine he had met, and that his car was stolen the day after Janine was killed.

Robert corroborates David's story to the police that he and David travelled home by tram the night Janine was killed, however Vanessa, who has severed her relationship with David, is conducting her own investigation and soon discovers that the tram system does not run on Thursday nights, making their alibi impossible. David has turned to heavy drinking to cope with stress, remorse about Janine's death and heartbreak at Vanessa ending their relationship. Vanessa goes to David's home to confront him however he is not there; when Robert appears she accuses them of lying about taking the tram home and Robert of having killed her sister, Robert then attacks and abducts her. When David arrives home Robert has already broken into his house and is waiting for him. Robert offers David a 2-week paid-for holiday to go fishing, however David angrily rejects the offer and ejects Robert from his house.

David tries to call Vanessa, but her phone is in Robert's possession, with Robert screening the calls and therefore knowing that David plans to confess to Vanessa. David tries to call in on Robert, but Robert is now hiding from him. At David's office he finds evidence that Robert has been there and spoken to Grant, and connects this with both the damage to his rental car and Grant's disaappearance. Robert next anonymously informs police of the location of the BMW, and Grant's body, aware that the police will connect these to David. Robert then calls David from Vanessa's phone and tells him he has Vanessa by the fishing lake. Before knocking her unconscious with a paddle, Robert confesses to Vanessa, who he is holding hostage, that Janine was still alive when they left the scene, and he told David she was dead in order to form a bond based on mutual conspiracy with him, because he had never had a brother.

David goes to the lake where he finds Vanessa apparently dead, beaten by Robert. He confronts Robert at the scene who tells him that everything he has done was for their friendship, because he regarded David as a brother. David attacks Robert for killing Vanessa, as he is punching him armed police turn up, having been called by Robert, and immediately arrest David. Robert then, believing Vanessa is dead, accuses David of all the murders, and is initially believed, telling the detective that his mother was from Latvia. However, when Robert is told by police that Vanessa has survived he realises his lies will be exposed, and drowns himself in the lake tied to an anchor.

== Cast ==
- Jonathan Rhys Meyers as Robert Graetz
- Luke Kleintank as David Stevens
- Eloise Smyth as Vanessa Rafael
- Bruce Davison as Grant
- Ieva Florence-Vīksne as Janine Rafael
- Guna Zariņa as Juta Reine
- Ieva Segliņa as Antra Valtere
- Regīna Razuma as Mrs. Petrova

== Development and Filming ==
After the success of his debut 2011 German film The Good Neighbour (film), writer and director Stephan Rick was approached by an American producer about doing a remake in English. Rick developed the idea of a remake for years, wanting to evolve things from the original and make significant improvements. Rick was inspired by 80s and 90s thrillers, including The Vanishing and Single White Female.

The Good Neighbour was shot on location in and around Riga between April 19th, 2021 and May 26th, 2021. It was co-produced by Latvian film production company Forma Pro films.

=== Release ===
The film was given a limited release in cinemas, and made available on VOD on June 17, 2022.

== Reception ==
The Good Neighbor received generally mixed reviews. Variety wrote that it is "polished and well-acted enough to provide a reasonably entertaining 90 minutes or so. But it’s not original, tense, or even plausible enough to prevent a feeling of moderate letdown once that span has passed." Other reviews praised the film for its interesting choice of location and suspense. Luke Y. Thompson of The A.V. Club graded the film a C+. Journalist Graham Phillips has called it one of his favourite films of recent times.

The film has a 25% rating on Rotten Tomatoes based on 12 reviews.
