= Die dunkle Seite des Mondes =

2000 novel by Martin Suter

- Author: Martin Suter
- Language: German
- Publisher: Diogenes Verlag
- Publication date: 2000
- Publication place: Switzerland
- Pages: 320
- ISBN: 978-3-257-06231-1

Die dunkle Seite des Mondes (lit. 'The Dark Side of the Moon') is a novel by the Swiss writer Martin Suter, first published by Diogenes Verlag in 2000. It is about a successful business lawyer who has a midlife crisis, starts an affair with a younger bohemian woman, takes hallucinogenic mushrooms and has a personality change that makes him violent and dangerous. The title is a reference to the album The Dark Side of the Moon by Pink Floyd.

The book was adapted into the 2015 film The Dark Side of the Moon directed by Stephan Rick and starring Moritz Bleibtreu.
