= Beresina, or the Last Days of Switzerland =

1999 film by Daniel Schmid

- Promotional poster
- Directed by: Daniel Schmid
- Written by: Martin Suter
- Produced by: Marcel Hoehn
- Starring: Elena Panova; Geraldine Chaplin; Martin Benrath; Ulrich Noethen; Iván Darvas
- Cinematography: Renato Berta
- Edited by: Daniela Roderer
- Music by: Carl Hänggi
- Release date: May 1999
- Running time: 108 minutes
- Countries: Switzerland; Germany; Austria
- Language: German

Beresina, or the Last Days of Switzerland (German: Beresina oder Die letzten Tage der Schweiz) is a 1999 Swiss satirical comedy film directed by Daniel Schmid and written by Martin Suter. It follows Irina, a Russian call girl who becomes entangled with figures from Swiss business, politics, the military, and the media, and unwittingly triggers the coup of a forgotten patriotic organisation. The film was screened in the Un Certain Regard section at the 1999 Cannes Film Festival.

== Synopsis ==
The film follows Irina, a Russian call girl who arrives in an Alpine country she comes to idealise. A lawyer and his companion introduce her to clients from business, politics, the military, and the media. She is caught between different interests and faces blackmail and possible deportation. Without meaning to, she sets off a coup planned by a forgotten patriotic organisation, known as the Beresina alarm. Her life, and the country, then change unexpectedly.

== Cast ==
The cast includes:

- Elena Panova as Irina
- Geraldine Chaplin as Carlotte De
- Martin Benrath as Alt-Divisionär Sturzenegger
- Ulrich Noethen as Dr. Alfred Waldvogel
- Iván Darvas as Direktor Vetterli

== Reception ==
=== Awards and nominations ===
At the Swiss Film Awards in 2000, the film received a nomination for Best Fiction Film.

=== Critical response ===
Variety described the film as “a rollicking socio-political farce that roasts just about everybody in a position of power”, adding that Daniel Schmid used black humour to expose Swiss high society as a “hypocritical façade hiding secrets from money-laundering to pimping”.

The New York Times review summary highlighted the film's “barbed wit” and “clever production design”, as well as Yelena Panova's comic performance.

Filmdienst described the film as a comedy that satirises Switzerland's history and contemporary clichés, but found that it ultimately failed because of its excesses, clumsy direction, and only average performances.

== Festival screenings ==
The film premiered in May 1999. It was screened that month in the Un Certain Regard section at the 1999 Cannes Film Festival, and later screened at festivals including the Seattle International Film Festival in May 2000, the Warsaw Film Festival in October 2000, the International Filmfestival Mannheim-Heidelberg in November 2000, the Buenos Aires International Independent Film Festival in April 2002, the Troia International Film Festival in June 2003, and the Zurich Film Festival in September 2016.

== See also ==
- List of submissions to the 72nd Academy Awards for Best Foreign Language Film
- List of Swiss submissions for the Academy Award for Best Foreign Language Film
