= The Good Neighbour (film) =

- Directed by: Stephan Rick
- Written by: Stephan Rick; Silja Clemens
- Produced by: Daniel Reich; Christoph Holthof
- Starring: Maxim Mehmet; Charly Hübner; Eloise Smyth
- Cinematography: Felix Cramer
- Edited by: Florian Drechsler
- Music by: Stefan Schulzki
- Release date: 12 June 2011 (Shanghai)
- Running time: 95 minutes
- Country: Germany
- Language: German
- Budget: $1.3 million

The Good Neighbour (German: Unter Nachbarn) is a 2011 German drama/thriller film directed by Stephan Rick. It premiered in competition at the 2011 Shanghai International Film Festival and was screened at the 2011 Montreal World Film Festival and the Hof International Film Festival.

In 2022, Rick directed an English-language remake of his own film (under the same title), starring Jonathan Rhys Meyers as Robert Graetz, Luke Kleintank as David Ahrens, Eloise Smyth as Vanessa Rafael, Bruce Davison as Grant and Ieva Florence as Janine Rafael.

The Good Neighbour was shot on location in Karlsruhe, Baden-Baden (including the Waldenecksee) and Mannheim, Germany. The thriller, about a new friendship between two men that takes a dark turn, is Rick's debut feature film. His previous work, the children's TV series Allein gegen die Zeit, had been nominated for the German Television Award and the International Emmy Award. The film received half its funding from German broadcaster ARD's SWR unit and from the film fund of Baden-Wuerttemberg.

Charly Hübner was awarded "Best German actor" of 2013, a Golden Camera Award.

== Cast ==
- Maxim Mehmet as David Ahrens
- Charly Hübner as Robert Graetz
- Eloise Smyth as Vanessa Rafael
- Helmut Rühl as Inspector Wagner
- Rainer Sellien as Hannes Fieser
- Katharina Heyer as Janine Rafael
