= The Last Weynfeldt =

2008 novel by Martin Suter

- Author: Martin Suter
- Original title: Der letzte Weynfeldt
- Translator: Steph Morris
- Language: German
- Publisher: Diogenes Verlag
- Publication date: 2008
- Publication place: Switzerland
- English publication date: 2016
- Pages: 313
- ISBN: 9783257066302

The Last Weynfeldt (German: Der letzte Weynfeldt) is a 2008 crime novel by the Swiss writer Martin Suter. It is set in the world of private art collecting and forgery in Zurich and follows a wealthy bachelor in his 50s who becomes involved with a young mysterious woman. Kirkus Reviews called it "entertaining, if also predictable" and a story that "doesn’t leave much of a lasting impression, for better or worse".

The book was adapted into the 2010 television film Der letzte Weynfeldt directed by Alain Gsponer and starring Stefan Kurt and Marie Bäumer.
