= Die Zeit, die Zeit =

Novel by Martin Suter

- First edition
- Author: Martin Suter
- Language: English
- Publisher: Diogenes Verlag
- Publication date: 2012

Die Zeit, die Zeit (English: The time, the time) is a novel by Martin Suter published in September 2012 by Diogenes Verlag.

The novel does not feature Suter's long-running character Detective Allmen. Instead, it features two amateur detectives brought together by the deaths of their wives. The book has an autobiographical element, reflecting the author's mourning for the death of his three-year-old son in 2009.

== Plot summary ==
The protagonist is Peter Taler, a 42-year-old who works at a building company. Taler's wife Laura was shot in front of their flat and he can't stop thinking about her. His aim is to locate and kill the killer of his wife.

Every evening he observes the surrounding houses, which leads his attention to his neighbour Knupp, whose wife died of malaria 20 years ago. Knupp feels guilty about her death. The 82-year-old believes that time doesn't exist but changes do. He wants to rearrange the whole area – trees, cars etc. – to look just as it did in pictures from the year 1991, when his wife died. In this way, he hopes to get his wife back.

Knupp blackmails Taler with pictures that promise hints about the killer of Taler's wife, forcing him to help with his rearrangements. The men restore houses, gardens, and Knupp's house to how they looked in 1991, incurring extensive financial and temporal costs. During this, Taler finds out that Knupp is the killer of his wife and kills him immediately.

== Reception ==
Der Spiegel found the book slow, but praised how it creates suspense and its convincing portrayal of the two main characters. Stern also praised its suspense, but found it not as good as his earlier novels, with too much detail and an implausible ending.

Hessian Broadcasting described it as a novel that activates thinking and turns our world topsy-turvy for a moment. Die Zeit, die Zeit is a necessity for all fans of Suter and those, who want to become it (29 August 2012).

== Book ==
- Hardcover: Diogenes, Zurich 2012, ISBN 978-3-257-06830-6
