= Hugo Salzmann =

Hugo Salzmann (February 4, 1903 – 1979) was a German trade unionist, Communist in the Weimar Republic, and an Anti-Fascist during and after the Second World War.

== Life ==
Salzmann was the son of a glassmaker, born in Bad Kreuznach. After completing an apprenticeship as a metalworker in Bad Kreuznach, he became head of the Metal Workers' Youth, Chairman of the Red Aid, Works Council Chairman, Chief Organiser of the KPD and political head of the League of Struggle against Fascism in Bad Kreuznach. In 1929 he was elected for the Communist Party in the city council, where he was chairman of the local General German Trade Union Federation.

Hugo Salzmann married Juliana Sternat in 1930. On November 2, 1932, their son Hugo was born.

== Exile ==
The family fled Germany in 1933 after the Nazi seizure of power, first to the Saar region and shortly thereafter to Paris. Salzmann worked as a packer and messenger; soon he was recognized as a political refugee and worked for exiled organizations of the KPD.

== Persecution, imprisonment ==
After the invasion of Poland at the beginning of the Second World War, Hugo Salzmann was arrested by the French police and interned in Le Vernet. Juliana Salzmann was also arrested in 1940 in Paris. Their son Hugo lived with her sister in Styria. Juliana Salzmann was sent to prison in Koblenz first then to the women's concentration camp at Ravensbrück where she died of typhoid on December 5, 1944.

At the end of 1941 Hugo Salzmann was extradited to Germany, jailed in Koblenz and in 1943 there convicted of conspiracy to commit treason and sentenced to eight years in prison. The sentence was served in Butzbach / Hessen prison. He was liberated in May 1945 by Americans.

== Postwar ==
After the war he was again a trade unionist and in 1945 was again elected to the city council of Bad Kreuznach for the KPD. Hugo Salzmann died in 1979. His son Hugo now lives with his family in Austria.

In Bad Kreuznach, a street is named after him.

== Sources ==
- The Salzmann Family - Erich Hackl
- Erich Hackl: Familie Salzmann. Erzählung aus unserer Mitte. Diogenes Verlag, Zürich 2010, 192 Pages. German. ISBN 978-3-257-06758-3
- Hans Canjé: Nicht alltägliche Ehrung. Bad Kreuznach erinnert an den Kommunisten Hugo Salzmann. In: Neues Deutschland, 24/25 August 2013, S. W 7
