= 2011 Shanghai International Film Festival =

Chinese film festival

- Opening film: Water for Elephants
- Location: Shanghai, China
- Awards: Golden Goblet
- No. of films: more than 200
- Festival date: June 11–19, 2011
- Website: http://www.siff.com

Shanghai International Film Festival chronology
- 2012 2010

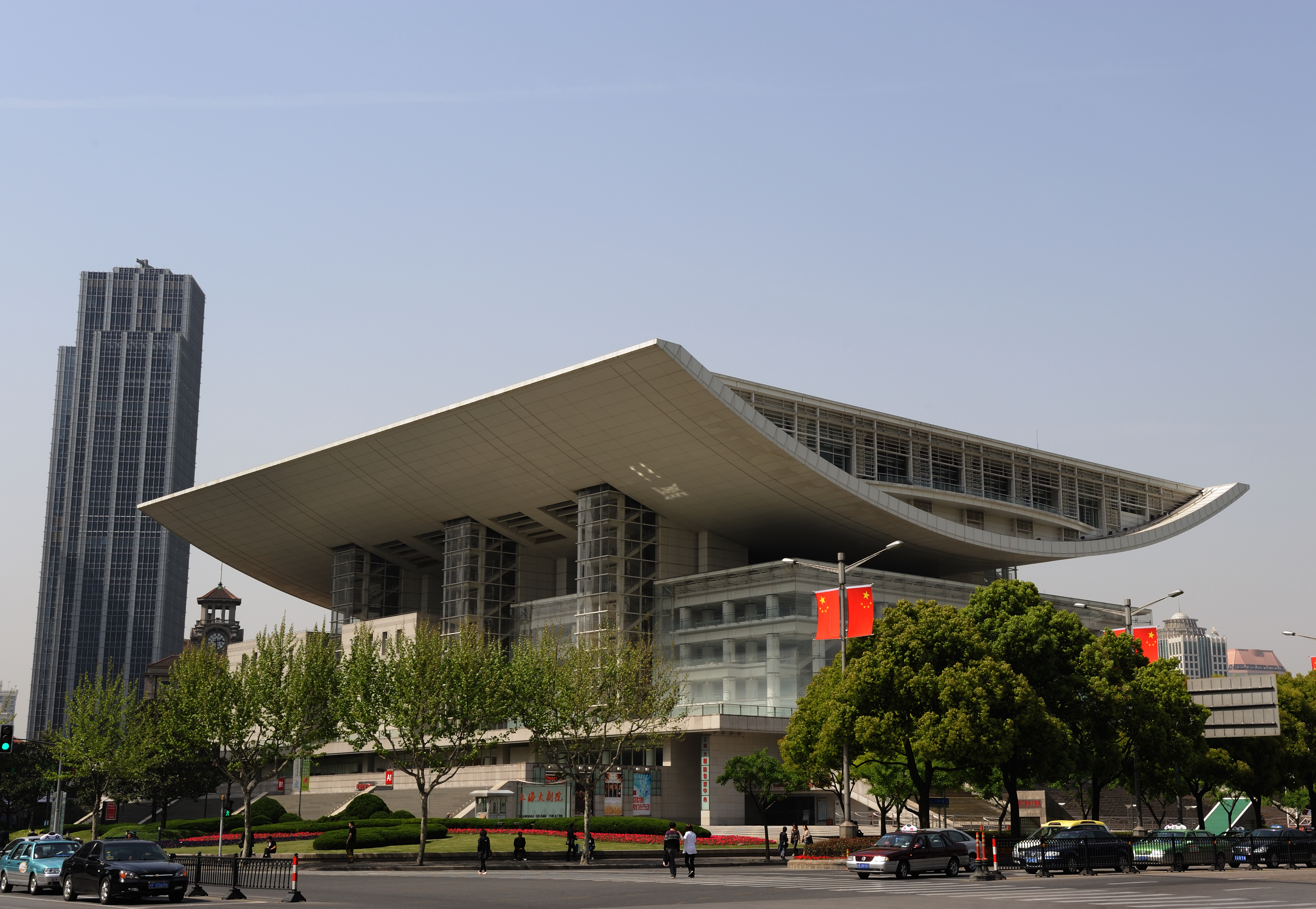
Shanghai Grand Theater

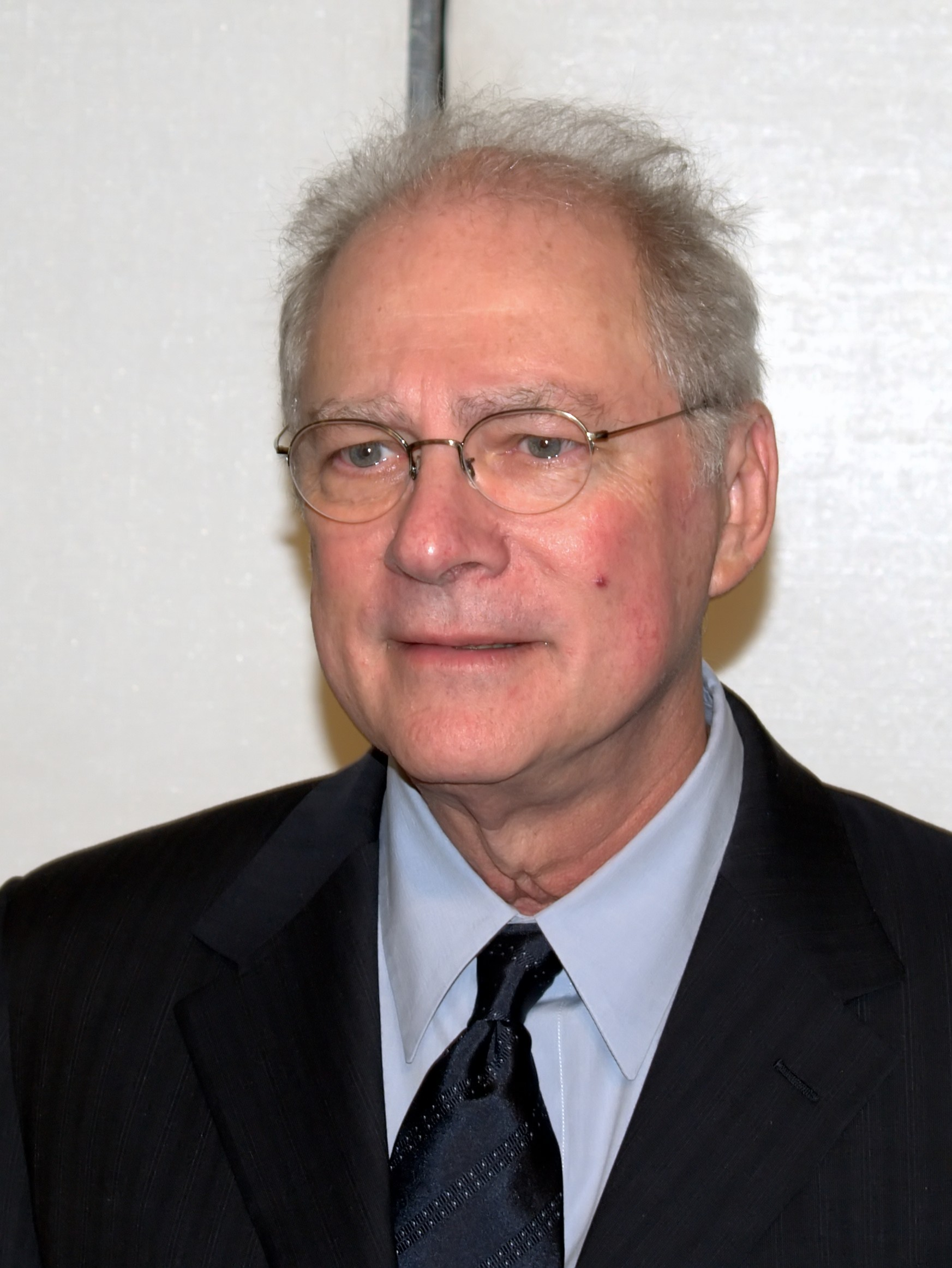
Barry Levinson, president of the jury for the Golden Goblet Award

The 2011 Shanghai International Film Festival was the 14th such festival devoted to international cinema held in Shanghai, China. It took place from June 11 to June 19, 2011. The opening and closing ceremonies were held at the Shanghai Grand Theater.

== International Jury ==
The members of the jury for the Golden Goblet Award were:

- Barry Levinson (USA; president of the jury)
- Christopher Hampton (UK)
- Yoichi Sai (Japan)
- Tran Anh Hung (France)
- Paz Vega (Spain)
- Wang Quan'an (China)
- Zhang Jingchu (China)

== In competition ==
The line-up for the Golden Goblet Award consisted of 16 films that were selected from 1,519 entries from 102 countries.

Title	Director	Country
The Bones Tunnel (El túnel de los huesos)	Nacho Garassino	Argentina
Time Bends (E o Tempo Passa)	Alberto Seixas Santos	Portugal
Ainom	Lorenzo Ceva Valla, Mario Garofalo	Italy
Hayde Bre	Orhan Oğuz	Turkey
Friday Killer	Yuthlert Sippapak	Thailand
Bunny Drop (Usagi Drop)	Sabu	Japan
The Quest (Moner Manush)	Goutam Ghose	India/Bangladesh
Alive and Ticking (Ein Tick anders)	Andi Rogenhagen	Germany
Tomorrow's Joe (Ashita no Joe)	Fumihiko Sori	Japan
The Good Neighbour (Unter Nachbarn)	Stephan Rick	Germany
Maya	Pluton Vasi	Albania
Hydraulic	Yevgeni Serov	Russia
There Be Dragons	Roland Joffé	United States/Argentina/Spain
The Young Man Sings Folk Songs in the Opposite Door	Zhang Ming	China
Mr. Tree	Han Jie	China
Rest on Your Shoulder	Jacob Cheung	China

== Winners ==
=== Golden Goblet Awards ===
Awards	Winners	Country
Best Feature Film	Hayde Bre directed by Orhan Oğuz	Turkey
Jury Grand Prix	Mr. Tree	China
Best Director	Han Jie for Mr. Tree	China
Best Screenplay	Zhang Min for The Young Man Sings Folk Songs in the Opposite Door	China
Best Actor	Sevket Emrulla in Hayde Bre	Turkey
Best Actress	Lu Xingchen in The Young Man Sings Folk Songs in the Opposite Door	China
Best Cinematography	Tiwa Moeithaisong for Friday Killer	Thailand
Best Music	Wen Zi for The Young Man Sings Folk Songs in the Opposite Door	China
Jury Award	Friday Killer directed by Yuthlert Sippapak	Thailand

=== Asian New Talent Award ===
- Best Director
  - Yung-Shing Teng for Return Ticket (China)
- Best Film
  - Kaasan: Mom's Life directed by Shōtarō Kobayashi (Japan)
- Special Jury Award
  - Birthright directed by Naoki Hashimoto (Japan)
