= Ash Hunter =

British TV and theatre actor

Ash Hunter is a British actor known for playing Heathcliff in Emma Rice’s production of Wuthering Heights at The National Theatre in London and Alexander Hamilton in the West End musical, Hamilton. He also had recurring roles in TV series Bridgerton (Netflix), Harlots (ITV/BBC/HULU) and The Secret Agent (BBC).

== Career ==
Hunter played the character Hedges in The Secret Agent – a BBC miniseries starring Stephen Graham and Toby Jones about a 19th century shop owner who doubles as a Russian spy.

He starred as the alternate Alexander Hamilton in the original production of hit West End musical Hamilton at the Victoria Palace Theatre in London from 2017-2018 before taking on the lead role full-time from December 2018 to early 2019.

In 2019 he took on the role of Hal Pincher in the third season of period TV drama Harlots, alongside Alfie Allen as his brother Isaac.

In 2020 he played Tom in series 1 of Shondaland’s historical-romance TV series Bridgerton, which became the most watched original TV series ever on Netflix

In 2021/22 Hunter took on the leading role of Heathcliff in Emma Rice’s acclaimed production of Wuthering Heights at The Bristol Old Vic in Bristol and The National Theatre in London.

The Times, which gave the play five stars, wrote: “The excellent Hunter sells us both on Heathcliff’s capricious cruelty and on the context of it” while the Evening Standard said: “Hunter powerfully expresses the character’s seething resentment and brutal iron will.” The British Theatre Guide called his depiction “an excellent performance of a difficult, complex character”.

Hunter’s other theatre credits include: A Midsummer Night's Dream at the Almeida, Antony and Cleopatra with the RSC and Light Shining in Buckinghamshire at The National Theatre.

He was included in the Evening Standard’s ‘The faces to watch in 2022 in TV and theatre’ list.

Most recently, Ash Hunter performed in Macbeth (2024) at the Leeds Playhouse. His performance was loved among critics.
