= Phantom Halo =

- Film poster
- Directed by: Antonia Bogdanovich
- Written by: Antonia Bogdanovich; Anne Heffron
- Produced by: William Blaylock; Peter Bogdanovich; Brian Espinosa; Gabriela Revilla
- Starring: Luke Kleintank; Thomas Brodie-Sangster; Sebastian Roché; Jordan Dunn; Tobin Bell; Rebecca Romijn
- Cinematography: Gavin Kelly
- Edited by: Javier Alvarez; David Moritz; Daniel R. Padgett
- Music by: Jason Lazarus
- Production companies: Station 8 Films; Optimism Entertainment
- Distributed by: ARC Entertainment
- Release dates: October 24, 2014 (Austin); June 19, 2015 (United States)
- Running time: 87 minutes
- Country: United States
- Language: English

Phantom Halo is a 2014 American crime thriller drama film directed by Antonia Bogdanovich and starring Luke Kleintank, Thomas Brodie-Sangster, Sebastian Roch, Jordan Dunn, Tobin Bell and Rebecca Romijn. It is Bogdanovich's directorial debut. Her father, Peter Bogdanovich, served as an executive producer.

== Cast ==
- Luke Kleintank as Beckett Emerson
- Thomas Brodie-Sangster as Samuel Emerson
- Sebastian Roché as Warren Emerson
- Jordan Dunn as Little Larry
- Tobin Bell as Smashmouth
- Rebecca Romijn as Ms. Rose
- Gbenga Akinnagbe as Roman
- Jeff Seymour as Adam
- Clare Grant as Carlene

== Reception ==
The film has an 8% rating on Rotten Tomatoes. Dann Gire of the Daily Herald awarded the film two stars. Oleg Ivanov of Slant Magazine awarded it half a star out of four. Roger Moore of The Mercury News gave the film one and a half stars. Oktay Ege Kozak of IndieWire graded the film a C−. Tirdad Derakhshani of The Philadelphia Inquirer gave the film one and a half stars out of four.
