= Philippe Fix =

French illustrator and author

Philippe Fix (born 1 May 1937) is a French illustrator and author of children's books. He studied Decorative Arts in Strasbourg at the Ecole des Arts Decoratifs and Ecole des Beaux-Arts in Paris.

== Career ==
Born in Grendelbruch, Département du Bas-Rhin, Alsace, Fix created the comic character Chouchou for the magazine Salut les copains in 1963. The magazine Chouchou was founded specifically for the character in 1964, and in the same year it appeared as a "singer" on two records with the voice of Jean-Jacques Debout at higher speed, including one song "La Mascotte des copains" with Fix's lyrics. In 1965 it appeared in the magazine Pilote. The book Chouchou au Far West was published in 1966.

Books with Fix' illustrations have appeared in French, German, English, Italian, Finnish, Danish, Dutch, Welsh, Swedish, Norwegian (bokmål), Spanish, Afrikaans, Japanese, Lithuanian, Portuguese, and Hebrew.

== Awards ==
- 1970 : "Mention" Premio Critici in Erba, Bologna Children's Book Fair (Italy) for Serafin und seine Wundermaschine, written by Alain Grée and Janine Ast, which Fix illustrated.
- 1972 : "Mention" Premio Grafico Fiera di Bologna per l'Infanzia, Bologna Children's Book Fair (Italy) for Serafin: lesen verboten, written by Alain Grée, illustrated by Fix.
- 1990: Hans Christian Andersen Diploma for Il y a cent ans déjà

== Bibliography ==
Title	Year	ISBN
Chouchou au Far West	1966	
Le Merveilleux Chef-d'oeuvre de Séraphin (English title: The House That Beebo Built)	1967	978-2842301491
Séraphin contre Séraphin (English title: Beebo and the Fizzimen)	1968	
Défense de lire Séraphin (English title: Beebo & Ben and the Funny Machine)	1968	
The kangaroo with a hole in her pocket	1968	
Alexander and the Magic Mouse	1969	9780828150064
L'éléphant rose à point d'or (English title: Arabella, the pink and gold spotted elephant)	1970	
The Book of Giant Stories	1972	978-1-56397-976-7
Mumps und Tilli reisen mit der Zeitmaschine (English title: Tim and Tilly and the Time Machine)	1977	3-257-00587-3
Popcorn the Hipporhino	1977	9780224013031
Mumps und Tilli kehren zurück	1978	9783257006070
Le livre de Paris - 2/Chroniques Parisiennes	1990	9782070395590
L'atelier du Père Noël	1992	9782070567737
Weihnachtszeit, schönste Zeit	1996	978-3473333653
Contes populaires du Maroc (English title: Moroccan Myths & Legends)	2003	978-2842301507

== Sources ==
- Philippe Fix on ricochet-jeunes.org
- Illustrations at theartofchildrenspicturebooks.blogspot.de
- The Book of Giant Stories, Publishers Weekly
- Not So Very Long Ago: Life in a Small Country Village, Publishers Weekly
