= Waldenecksee =

Quarry lake in Germany

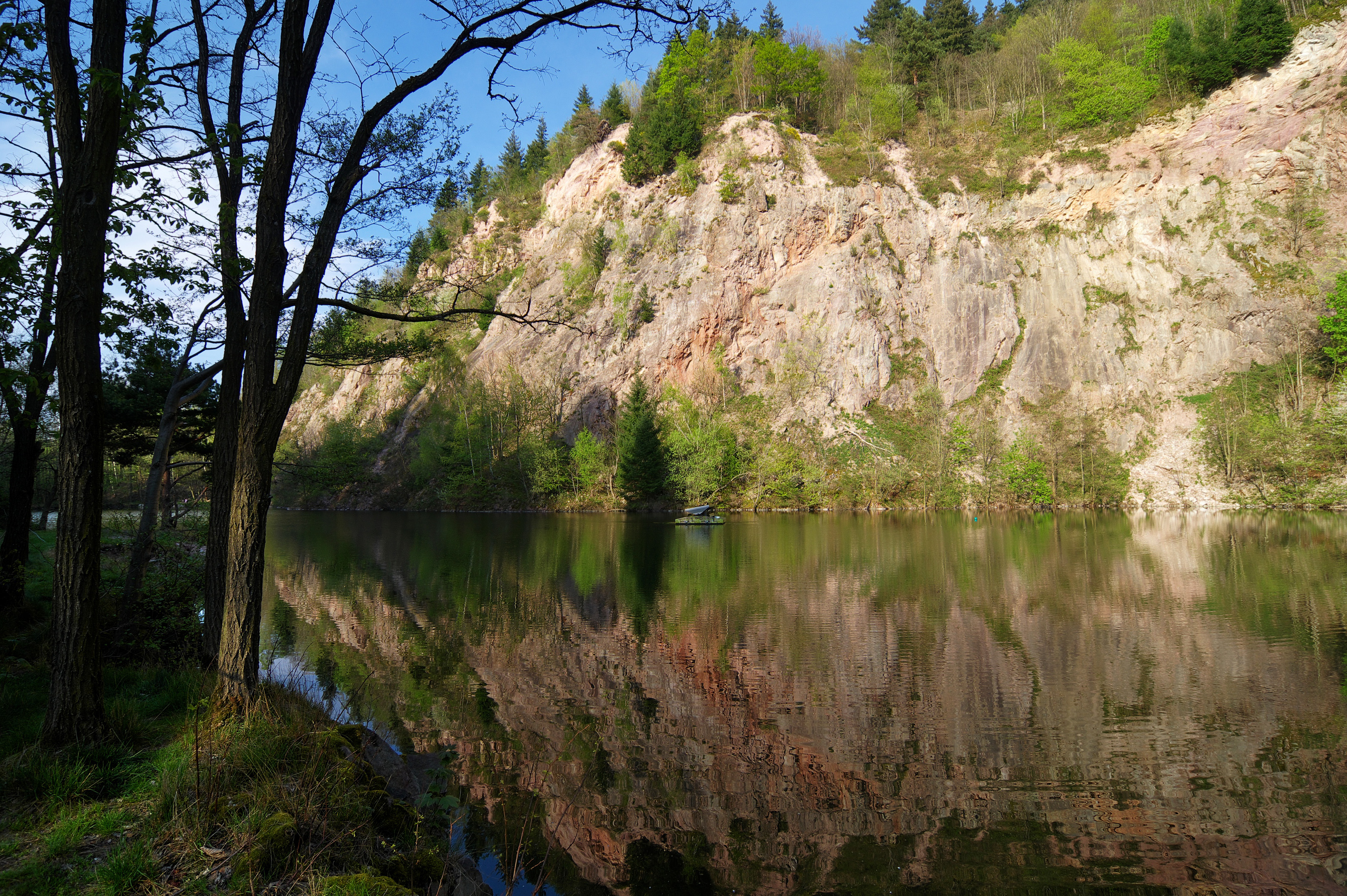
- Rock faces of the abandoned Waldeneck Quarry and the Waldenecksee

- Location within Germany
- Location: Sinzheim, Baden-Württemberg
- Coordinates: 48°44′16″N 8°12′33″E

The Waldenecksee or Petersee is a quarry lake on the western edge of the Northern Black Forest. It lies in an exclave of the municipality of Sinzheim, surrounded by Baden-Baden, between Iberg and Fremersberg on the western side of the hill of Waldeneck. Around 1900 a quarry was established here that was worked until 1968. After that a lake formed on the floor of the quarry, about 200 metres long and 35–75 metres wide. One of its common names, the Petersee, is derived from the name of the former quarry owners, the Peter Porphyry Gravel Works (Porphyr-Schotterwerk Peter). Today it is leased as an angling lake and bathing is forbidden.

== Ecology ==
Because water could not circulate in the lake as it is fed by springs and surface water, and because of nutrients introduced by plant growth and bathers, there was a risk of life in the lake dying out. This could only be prevented in summer 2013 by the intervention of the fire service who enriched the lake water by spraying it with oxygen.

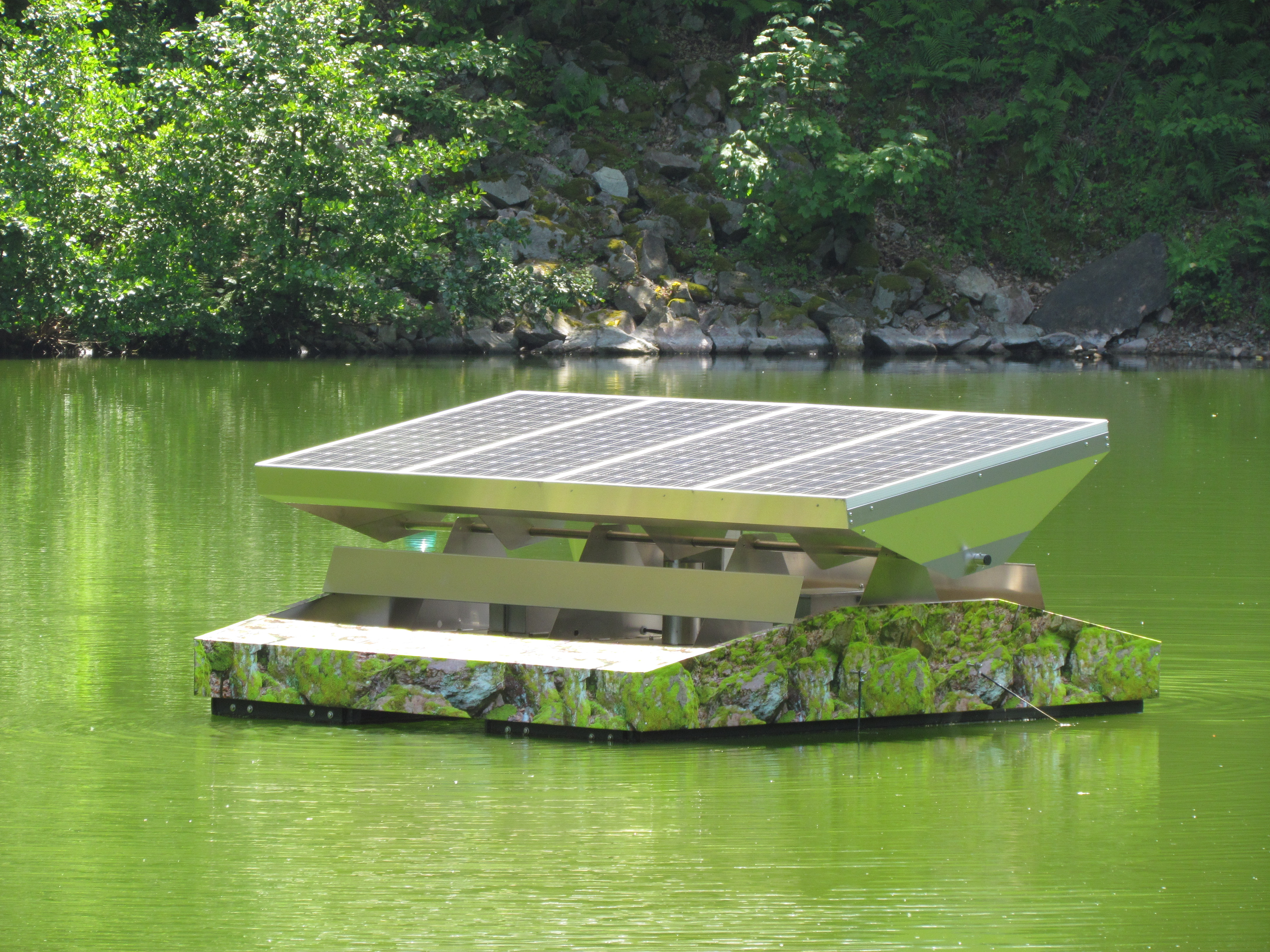
Solar-driven circulator pump

Thereafter the leaseholders of the lake, Sinzheim Sports Fishing Club, with financial support from the municipality of Sinzheim 2014, installed a solar-powered circulator pump, which pumps water from the lakebed to the surface.

== Geology ==
Quartz porphyry of the upper Rotliegendes is visible on the rock walls of the quarry. They are ignimbrite rhyolites, that is, pyroclastic volcanic rocks which have not flowed out as lava and cooled. but are formed from fluid suspensions of small magmatic particles in highly heated gases. Three of lava fields of ignimbrite of different colours and mineral composition are recognizable from bottom to top. The rocks are lithostratigraphically part of the Lichtental Formation, which is composed of remains of a volcano that is almost 300 million years old. The Baden-Württemberg State Office for Geology, Raw Materials and Mining (Landesamt für Geologie, Rohstoffe und Bergbau Baden-Württemberg) classifies the abandoned Waldeneck Quarry as a valuable geotope.

== Film location ==
The terrain of the quarry and lake, which is about 2 kilometres from the Baden-Baden broadcasting studio of Südwestrundfunk is repeated used as a film location. For example, in 1984 in the four-part historical series, The Lenz Papers, where it represented Hell Valley, in several episodes of the TV crime series Tatort and in 2010 as the scene of the showdown in the thriller, The Good Neighbour.
