= Daniel Schmid =

Swiss film director and screenwriter (1941–2006)

- Born: 26 December 1941; Flims, Switzerland
- Died: 6 August 2006 (aged 64); Flims, Switzerland
- Occupations: Film director, opera director, screenwriter

Daniel Schmid (26 December 1941 – 6 August 2006) was a Swiss film and opera director and screenwriter. Films through which he gained international recognition included La Paloma (1974), Schatten der Engel (1976) and Beresina oder Die letzten Tage der Schweiz (1999). Beresina was selected by the Federal Office of Culture as Switzerland's entry for the Academy Award for Best Foreign Language Film. Schmid received the Leopard of Honour at the Locarno International Film Festival in 1999 and a lifetime-achievement diploma at the Kyiv International Film Festival Molodist in 2002.

== Biography ==
Daniel Schmid was born on 26 December 1941 in Flims, in the canton of Grisons, to hotel owners Arthur Schmidt, who was also a musician, and Carla Bivetti. Originally registered as Daniel Schmidt, he used Daniel Schmid professionally. He grew up in the family-run Hotel Schweizerhof in Flims, where he later shot many of his films.

Between 1962 and 1968, Schmid studied history and journalism at the Free University of Berlin. Alongside his studies, he worked as an interpreter, journalist and translator. In 1966, he began attending the German Film and Television Academy Berlin, where he studied until 1969.

Schmid took part in student protests in Munich and Berlin alongside Rainer Werner Fassbinder and Werner Schroeter. He lived openly as a gay man during his years in Berlin. In 1977, he returned to Switzerland.

Schmid and Fassbinder were friends and appeared in each other's films. He appeared in Fassbinder's The Merchant of Four Seasons (1971) and Lili Marleen (1980). In 1988, he served on the international jury of the Berlin International Film Festival. In 1996, he co-chaired the Caméra d'Or jury at the Cannes Film Festival.

Schmid received the Grisons Culture Prize in 1986. In 1998, he received the City of Zurich Art Prize for his film work and opera productions. In 1999, the Locarno International Film Festival awarded him its Leopard of Honour. In 2002, Schmid received a lifetime-achievement diploma at the Kyiv International Film Festival Molodist. His films were the subject of retrospectives in Boston, Washington, New York, Chicago, Vancouver, Montreal and Paris. He died of cancer in Flims on 6 August 2006.

== Work ==
=== Film ===
Schmid's 1974 film La Paloma was hailed by critics as his masterpiece. The film established his reputation in European cinema. It used theatrical and deliberately artificial imagery, presenting reality as surreal and constructed. He became known through Schatten der Engel (1976), his adaptation of Rainer Werner Fassbinder's play Die Stadt, der Müll und der Tod. His 1984 documentary Il bacio di Tosca was about Casa Verdi in Milan, a retirement home for opera singers.

In Zwischensaison (1992), Schmid drew directly on memories of his childhood in a hotel. He collaborated repeatedly with writer Martin Suter, who wrote the screenplays for Jenatsch, Zwischensaison and Beresina. His 1999 satire Beresina oder Die letzten Tage der Schweiz screened at the Cannes and Locarno film festivals and was selected by the Federal Office of Culture as Switzerland's entry for the Academy Award for Best Foreign Language Film.

Schmid was influenced by German Expressionist cinema and the melodramas of Douglas Sirk. He embraced artificiality, visual beauty and heightened emotion as central elements of his filmmaking. His films combined a refined aesthetic style with social criticism and satire.

=== Opera and theatre ===
Schmid's first theatre production was Ingrid Caven's chanson programme Ingrid Caven au Pigall's, staged in Paris in 1978. His first opera productions were Offenbach's Barbe-Bleue at the Grand Théâtre de Genève in 1984 and Berg's Lulu there in 1985.

He directed Rossini's Guillaume Tell at the Zurich Opera House in 1987 and Donizetti's Linda di Chamounix in 1995. In the same year, he directed Bellini's I puritani in Geneva. Further productions included Verdi's Il trovatore in 1996 and the Swiss premiere of Bellini's Beatrice di Tenda in Zurich in 2001. Schmid staged four Italian bel canto operas at the Zurich Opera House and three at the Grand Théâtre de Genève.

== Selected filmography ==
=== Director ===
A selection of Schmid's films as director includes:

- Thut alles im Finstern eurem Herrn das Licht zu ersparen (1971)
- Heute nacht oder nie (1972)
- La Paloma (1974)
- Schatten der Engel (1976)
- Violanta (1977)
- Notre dame de la croisette (1981)
- Hécate (1982)
- Mirage de la vie (1983)
- Il bacio di Tosca (1984)
- Barbe Bleu (1984)
- Jenatsch (1987)
- Les amateurs 1912–1931 (1991)
- Hors Saison (1992)
- The Written Face (1995)
- Beresina oder Die letzten Tage der Schweiz (1999)
- Flimmerndes Flims / Les amateurs (2003)

=== As actor ===
- The Merchant of Four Seasons (1971)
- The American Friend (1977)
- Lili Marleen (1980)
