= Victoria Emslie =

British actress

- Born: Victoria Emslie; London, England
- Education: University of St Andrews, Royal Central School of Speech and Drama
- Occupation: Actress
- Years active: 2013–present
- Notable work: Downton Abbey; The Danish Girl (film); Grace (TV series); 12 Monkeys (TV series)

Victoria Emslie is a British stage, television and film actress, best known for her roles in Downton Abbey, The Theory of Everything, The Frankenstein Chronicles, The Danish Girl (film), Grace (TV series) and the TV adaption of 12 Monkeys.

== Education ==
She has a Masters in French and Arabic from the University of St. Andrews Emslie chose these languages as an opportunity to live abroad and travel. She then studied for an MA in Acting For Screen at the Royal Central School of Speech and Drama.

== Career ==
=== Screen ===
In 2015, Emslie joined the cast of Downton Abbey played Audrey. She is a recurring character in the sixth and final series of Downton Abbey.

She played the newly devised character of the Automaton in ITV's The Frankenstein Chronicles. In preparation for the role, she had to have a full body cast taken, including exact replicas of her hands, face and body.

In 2018, Emslie booked her first television Guest Lead role playing Amelia in 12 Monkeys.

When Emslie was filming "Dusk", she reunited with Jake Graf who she met working on The Danish Girl, who wrote the part with her in mind.

In 2023, Emslie returned to Brighton near to where she grew up to join the series 3 cast of Grace playing the lead role of a rising rock star Gaia Lafayette based on the Peter James novel Not Dead Yet.

=== Stage ===
Emslie played the titular role in Lotty's War, during a No.1 UK tour in 2016. The production returned to Guernsey, where the play was set, which Emslie said was a privilege to be a part of. Emslie spoke about how refreshing it was to have such a strong female lead character who was onstage for the duration of the play.

=== Advocacy ===
Emslie is also a member of Time's Up UK and ERA 50:50. She bootstrapped Primetime to provide a solution to challenge the gender inequality behind the camera in the Entertainment Industry which launched at Cannes Film Festival in 2019. She has stated "Primetime is a centralised global database of all the women working above and below the line behind the camera in the Entertainment Industry so there can no longer be the excuse of "Where are all the women"." She organised 300 1-2-1 meetings alongside BECTU between underrepresented talent and those with hiring power which resulted in high end TV jobs for those attending. Emslie and the Primetime platform have been nominated and won a number of awards, such as the award 'Shaker Of The Year Award' and in 2023 she was listed as one of NatWest's top 100 women working in Social Enterprise.

On September 30, 2021, Emslie was a participant in the Kindness In Film Summit with a focus on 'Duty Of Care Towards Actors'. It was established to bring awareness of better kindness practices within the Entertainment Industry, especially since the beginning of the COVID pandemic.

Emslie believes that everyone has their part to play in making change happen and that there is also a responsibility for those with privilege to use it to make spaces more representative for all.

Emslie launched a fund at Cannes Film Festival in 2023 to finance work by female and non-binary filmmakers which will feature Jodie Whittaker.

== Public image ==
Emslie was named as One To Watch in Kneon Magazine and advocates for the separation of the professional and private lives of performers.

Emslie appears in photographer Simon Annand's book, Time To Act. She appears in Helen O'Hara's book Women vs Hollywood: The Fall and Rise of Women in Film. She also did a podcast where Emslie said there are not enough women behind the camera. Emslie has spoken about pressures arising from being a woman in the entertainment industry and advocates for the industry to be a safer environment for all. She has also recently been on the Jury for BAFTA Scotland in the Best Actor category, the Jury for BAFTA in the Casting category and sits on BAFTA's Disability Advisory Group

She is an ambassador for the homelessness charity St Mungo's and has climbed Scafell Pike and Ben Nevis with their clients. She has also participated in their campaigns

== Filmography ==
=== TV series ===
- 2023: Grace: Gaia Lafayette
- 2018: 12 Monkeys: Amelia
- 2017: The Frankenstein Chronicles: Automaton
- 2015: Downton Abbey: Audrey

=== Films ===
- 2021: I'm Not In Love: Lydia
- 2018: Love Type D: Susannah
- 2015: The Danish Girl: Gallery Employee
- 2014: The Theory Of Everything: Sarah
- 2013: The Christmas Candle: Mrs. Haddington 1690

=== Short films ===
- 2017: Dusk: Julie
- 2017: Run It Off: Kate
- 2016: Speakeasy: Alice
- 2014: Her Forgotten Act: Actress
- 2013: Juniper Crescent: Caitlyn

== Awards and nominations ==
Year	Award	Category	Work	Result	Ref.
2020	Makers & Shakers	Shaker Of The Year	Primetime	Won	
2017	British Independent Film Awards	Best Supporting Actress	Run It Off	Nominated	
2014	London Fashion Film Festival	Best Actor or Model	Her Forgotten Act	Nominated	
