= Small World (2010 film) =

- Film poster
- French: Je n'ai rien oublié
- Directed by: Bruno Chiche
- Written by: Bruno Chiche
- Based on: Small World by Martin Suter
- Produced by: Nicolas Duval; Yann Zenou; Amelie Latscha; Felix Moeller; Nathalie Andries; Arnaud Bertrand; Dominique Boutonnat; Niels Court-Payen; Farid Tourab; Camille Lipmann
- Starring: Gérard Depardieu; Niels Arestrup
- Cinematography: Thomas Hardmeier
- Edited by: Marion Monnier
- Music by: Klaus Badelt; Jean-Michel Bernard
- Production companies: Quad Productions; Blueprint Film; Studio 37; Chaocorp; Profidev; Apidev 2010
- Distributed by: Rézo Films (France); Majestic Filmverleih (Germany)
- Release dates: 10 December 2010 (Marrakech); 16 December 2010 (Germany); 30 March 2011 (France)
- Running time: 93 minutes
- Countries: France; Germany
- Language: French
- Budget: $7.4 million
- Box office: $3.9 million

Small World (French: Je n'ai rien oublié; lit. 'I've not forgotten anything') is a 2010 Franco-German drama film directed by Bruno Chiche and adapted from the book Small World by Martin Suter.

== Synopsis ==
Conrad Lang is the handyman of a wealthy family. He grew up as the brother of Thomas, the family son who is the same age. Conrad accidentally sets fire to the large holiday home of which he was the guardian. He then returns to the city of his childhood, on the wedding day of Phillipe (son of Thomas) and Simone. Memory problems and repeated behavior quickly reveal neurological disease to Conrad, which brings Elvira, Thomas' stepmother, to install him with a nurse in the home of a friend.

== Cast ==
- Gérard Depardieu as Konrad Lang
- Niels Arestrup as Thomas Senn
- Françoise Fabian as Elvira Senn
- Nathalie Baye as Elisabeth Senn
- Alexandra Maria Lara as Simone Senn
- Yannick Renier as Philippe Senn
- Olivier Rohde as Arthur Senn
- Féodor Atkine as Scholler
- Anne Benoît as Nadia
- Pascale Arbillot as Dr. Wirth
- Olivier Claverie as Dr. Cohen
- Hélène Hardouin as Consuela
- Sarah Stern as Anna
- Corinne Debonnière as Sophie

== Festival ==
The film premiered at the Marrakech International Film Festival, 10 December 2010.
