= Fortitude (TV series) =

2015-2018 British television series

- Genre: Psychological thriller; Drama; Mystery; Horror
- Created by: Simon Donald
- Starring: see Main cast
- Opening theme: "Peeling Off the Layers" by Wildbirds & Peacedrums
- Composer: Ben Frost
- Country of origin: United Kingdom
- Original language: English
- No. of seasons: 3
- No. of episodes: 26

Production
- Executive producers: Simon Donald; Anne Mensah; Cameron Roach; Patrick Spence; Frith Tiplady; Andrew Woodhead
- Producer: Matthew Bird
- Production locations: Seasons 1–2: Reyðarfjörður, Iceland; London, England; Season 3: Svalbard, Norway; The Bottle Yard Studios, Bristol, England
- Running time: 46–49 minutes
- Production companies: Fifty Fathoms; Tiger Aspect Productions

Original release
- Network: Sky Atlantic
- Release: 29 January 2015 – 27 December 2018

Fortitude is a British horror psychological thriller television series created and written by Simon Donald. A 12-episode season was commissioned by Sky Atlantic in 2013, and started airing on 29 January 2015. The series is set in the fictional Arctic Norwegian settlement of Fortitude. On 9 April 2015, Sky Atlantic recommissioned the show for a second season consisting of 10 episodes, which premiered on 26 January 2017. The third and final season premiered on 6 December 2018 and concluded on 27 December, consisting of 4 episodes.

== Premise ==
On the Norwegian Arctic island of Fortitude, things appear calm on the surface, but a string of violent and increasingly strange deaths slowly exact a toll on the quiet international community where almost everyone appears to be keeping at least one secret.

== Cast ==
=== Main cast ===
Actor	Character	Series		
Actor	Character	1	2	3
Richard Dormer	Sheriff Dan Anderssen	Main	Main	Main
Sofie Gråbøl	Governor Hildur Odegard	Main	Main	Main
Björn Hlynur Haraldsson	Police Sergeant / Sheriff Eric Odegard	Main	Main	Main
Mia Jexen	Police Constable Ingrid Witrey	Main	Main	Main
Alexandra Moen	Police Constable Petra Bergen	Main	Main	Main
Sienna Guillory	Natalie Yelburton	Main	Main	Main
Luke Treadaway	Vincent Rattrey	Main	Main	Main
Darren Boyd	Markus Huseklepp	Main	Main	Main
Verónica Echegui	Elena Ledesma	Main	Main	
Ramon Tikaram	Tavrani Tavra	Main	Main	
Nicholas Pinnock	Frank Sutter	Main		
Jessica Raine	Julia 'Jules' Sutter	Main		
Christopher Eccleston	Professor Charlie Stoddart	Main		
Stanley Tucci	Detective Chief Inspector Eugene Morton	Main		
Michael Gambon	Henry Tyson	Main		Guest
Jessica Gunning	Shirley Allerdyce	Main		Guest
Johnny Harris	Ronnie Morgan	Main		
Elizabeth Dormer-Phillips	Carrie Morgan	Main		
Aaron McCusker	Jason Donnelly	Main		
Phoebe Nicholls	Margaret Allerdyce	Main		
Emil Hoștină	Yuri Lubimov	Main		
Dennis Quaid	Michael Lennox		Main	Main
Michelle Fairley	Freya Lennox		Main	
Edvin Endre	Rune Lennox		Main	
Ken Stott	Erling Munk		Main	
Parminder Nagra	Surinder Khatri		Main	Guest
Robert Sheehan	Vladek Klimov		Main	
Paul Ready	Mark Devlin		Main	
Aliette Opheim	Elsa Schenthal			Main
Abubakar Salim	Boyd Mulvihill			Main
Maria Schrader	Detective Chief Inspector Ingemar Myklebust			Main
Set Sjöstrand	Detective Sergeant Torsten Øby			Main
Brigid Zengini	Annie Burgess			Main

=== Recurring cast ===
- Tam Dean Burn as Billy Pettigrew (series 1, 3)

==== Series 1 ====
- Chipo Chung as Trish Stoddart
- Darwin Brokenbro as Liam Sutter
- Elizabeth Dormer-Phillips as Carrie Morgan
- Michael Obiora as Max Cordero
- Emil Hoștină as Yuri Lubimov
- Jonjo O'Neill as Ciaran Donnelly
- Leanne Best as Celia Donnelly
- Lorcan Cranitch as DI Bernard Littlejohn

==== Series 2 ====
- Jude Akuwudike as Dr Adebimpe
- Gershwyn Eustache Jnr as Tomak Bowzyk
- Rune Temte as Lars Ulvinaune
- Eloise Smyth as Yeva Podnikov
- David Yip as Hong Mankyo
- Ralph Riach as Ralfi Sigurdson
- Joi Johannsson as Axel Fersen
- Steve Toussaint as Avec Lamont
- Mark Field as 'The Fiend'
- Jessica Henwick as Bianca Mankyo
- Robert Sheehan as Vladek Klimov

==== Series 3 ====
- Simon Donald as Neil McIndoe

== Production ==
=== Conception ===
After talking to a parasitologist, writer Simon Donald based his parasite on ichneumon wasps, which lay their eggs in hosts.

=== Location ===
Fortitude is a fictional community located in Svalbard in Arctic Norway. It is described as an international community, with inhabitants from many parts of the world (population of 713 inhabitants and 4 police officers). The series was filmed in both the UK and Reyðarfjörður, Iceland.

=== Casting ===
American actor Stanley Tucci appears in his first British television role as Detective Chief Inspector Morton from London's Metropolitan Police, who has flown to the peaceful close-knit community of Fortitude as the local sheriff, played by Richard Dormer, investigates a violent murder. Christopher Eccleston plays Charlie Stoddart, a British scientist who leads the arctic biology department at the Fortitude arctic research facility. Michael Gambon portrays Henry Tyson, a wildlife photographer who is dying of cancer. The Killing star Sofie Gråbøl plays Hildur Odegard, the governor of Fortitude, in her first UK television drama role.

== Episodes ==
Series	Episodes	Originally released	
Series	Episodes	First released	Last released
1	12	29 January 2015	9 April 2015
2	10	26 January 2017	30 March 2017
3	4	6 December 2018	27 December 2018

=== Season 1 (2015) ===
No. overall	No. in series	Title	Directed by	Written by	Original release date	UK viewers (millions)
1	1	"Episode 1"	Sam Miller	Simon Donald	29 January 2015	1.53
An elderly photographer, Henry Tyson, searching the icy surf for places to photograph, hears screams. Rushing towards them, he discovers a man being disemboweled by a polar bear. He tries to shoot the bear to save the man but accidentally shoots the man in the head instead. Immediately after, Sheriff Dan Anderssen arrives and tells Tyson he will take responsibility for the mercy killing. Professor Charlie Stoddart, a scientist at the Fortitude research centre, is approached by Jason Donnelly, who claims to have found a mammoth carcass. When Jason offers to sell Charlie the carcass, he refuses and threatens to report Donnelly to the police for the illegal sale of a scientific discovery. Meanwhile, a young boy, Liam Sutter, faints after taking a walk with his friend, Carrie Morgan. When he later awakens, he discovers he is alone. His father, Frank, who is supposed to be looking after him, is nowhere to be seen. Liam opens up his bedroom window, and climbs barefoot into the snow. When he develops frostbite, he is rushed to hospital. Meanwhile, scientist Vincent Rattrey arrives at Stoddart's house for a planned meeting and finds his body, the victim of a savage attack.
2	2	"Episode 2"	Sam Miller	Simon Donald	29 January 2015	1.53
Rattrey is taken to the police station, but as forensic officers arrive to sweep the crime scene, they discover Stoddart is still alive, but he dies on the way to hospital. The mysterious disappearance of Natalie Yelburton leads Sheriff Anderssen to suspect she is either the perpetrator or another victim. When Henry Tyson discovers Stoddart has been murdered, he makes a call to an old friend in Britain. DCI Eugene Morton, from the London Metropolitan Police, arrives to investigate. Anderssen isn't pleased at Morton's arrival and immediately makes his feelings known. Dr. Allerdyce offers Liam's mother Julia the chance for Liam to take part in an experimental procedure which could stave the effects of frostbite.
3	3	"Episode 3"	Sam Miller	Simon Donald	5 February 2015	1.26
The search for Natalie Yelburton continues, but information from Eric Odegard points the team toward Jason Donnelly, who they suspect may be responsible for Stoddart's murder, whom he confronted earlier in the day. Sheriff Anderssen is suspicious when he learns Morton left London before Stoddart's murder was reported. Meanwhile, Morton receives advice from local teacher Markus Huseklepp, who turns to him after a violent confrontation with Frank Sutter. As the search for Natalie and Jason leads the team to an exploration bunker out on the glacier, they finally stumble upon a possible motive for the murder. As the team set out to find Jason's brother Ciaran, Governor Hildur discovers Stoddart left a telephone message for his wife, which could thwart her plans to build a hotel on the glacier.
4	4	"Episode 4"	Richard Laxton	Stephen Brady	12 February 2015	1.10
Ciaran is found beaten and gagged in a warehouse at the back of his shop, and he points the finger towards Ronnie Morgan, whom he claims demanded passage on a boat. When Ciaran tries to defend himself with a knife, Morgan grabs it with his right hand. Morgan and his daughter, Carrie, are missing. Meanwhile, Morton seizes his chance to interview Henry Tyson, who denies making the phone call that brought Morton to Fortitude. When Eric Odegard pays a visit to Julia, an unexpected accident leads him to discover Frank's blood-stained T-shirt in the bathroom. Eric tries to alert Sheriff Anderssen, but he is out of radio range while searching for a boat used by Ronnie Morgan in his escape. Later, a vital piece of evidence belonging to Stoddart is stolen from Morton's hotel room while he is distracted by an altercation next door, where he discovers an angry Sheriff Anderssen savagely beating Frank.
5	5	"Episode 5"	Richard Laxton	Simon Donald	19 February 2015	1.15
Frank is taken in and interviewed by Morton. He denies being responsible for Stoddart's murder and claims, on the night in question, he found his son covered in blood, saying this was caused by a ruptured swelling in his son's throat. Hildur organizes a DNA test to determine if the blood found on the shirt is Stoddart's or Liam's. Elena reveals he snuck out to have sex with her and left his son alone. The blood is confirmed to belong to Stoddart, but Frank is adamant that he found his son covered in blood and was not responsible for the murder. When Anderssen finds a pair of blood-stained pyjamas hidden in Liam's room, the evidence seemingly confirms Frank's story. Meanwhile, Ronnie Morgan and Carrie camp out on the glacier to hide from the police.
6	6	"Episode 6"	Hettie MacDonald	Simon Donald	26 February 2015	1.15
In a flashback to the night of the murder, Liam is seen leaving his bedroom and walking over to Stoddart's house. He attacks him with a chopping board before taking cover under the kitchen table when he hears growling. Further forensic examination of Stoddart's body reveals a broken fingernail lodged in a rib, which is later determined to belong to Liam. Dr. Allerdyce wakens Liam in his hyperbaric chamber just long enough for him to confirm to Morton he was present at the murder scene. Jason discovers Ronnie has taken an ivory tusk from the mammoth carcass. Meanwhile, the focus of Morton's investigation switches to the dead Pettigrew, a geologist who was eaten by a polar bear. After discovering who was responsible for stealing the evidence, he unexpectedly stumbles upon a possible crime scene.
7	7	"Episode 7"	Hettie MacDonald	Tom Butterworth & Chris Hurford	5 March 2015	1.05
As Fortitude begins to come to terms with Stoddart's death, Morton begins his investigation to find out who was responsible for Pettigrew's murder. After visiting the research centre and speaking with lab technician Max Cordero, he decides to track down Yuri Lubimov, whom he is certain holds vital information on the case. Shirley Allerdyce becomes more and more sick, but her boyfriend Markus continues to make her more beautiful in his eyes by feeding her. Lubimov suggests to Morton that Eric was responsible for Pettigrew's murder, and that his police colleagues have hidden evidence in order to protect him. Henry Tyson has a flashback and realizes he photographed Pettigrew's murder scene. Ronnie Morgan arranges a deal to sell the ivory tusk to purchase passage on a fishing boat, but the captain steals it instead at gunpoint. Shirley's illness overcomes her, leading her to brutally attack her own mother by hitting her on the head, cutting open her belly, then vomiting into the wound.
8	8	"Episode 8"	Hettie MacDonald	Ben Richards	12 March 2015	1.00
The townsfolk are disturbed by the second attack and suspect a serial killer. Shirley is found dead of a heart attack in a nearby supermarket. Frank Sutter becomes convinced the second attack proves his son was not responsible for Stoddart's murder and tries to find evidence to prove Markus' involvement. Carrie Morgan discovers that her father has a large cut in the palm of his right hand. As he becomes septic, she abandons him. As Dr. Allerdyce fights for her life in hospital, Carrie finally returns home.
9	9	"Episode 9"	Nick Hurran	Stephen Brady	19 March 2015	1.03
Elena looks after Carrie. Frank Sutter interrogates and tortures Huseklepp, convinced he was responsible for his son's involvement in Stoddart's death. Meanwhile, Rattrey and Yelburton receive a note from Stoddart, to be delivered in the event of his death. It asks them to perform a brain analysis on a polar bear who was found to have mauled and eaten another adult male. Toxins discovered in the bear's brain inspire Rattrey to perform the same analysis on Shirley Allerdyce to determine if her body carried the same toxins. Rattrey theorizes that an environmental factor played a part in both murders when the test results come back positive. Morton continues to probe the circumstances surrounding Pettigrew's death. When he finds a series of photographs in Henry Tyson's dark room depicting the scene that reveal Pettigrew's severed arm attached to a pylon on the beach by handcuffs, he realises Sheriff Anderssen has lied to him.
10	10	"Episode 10"	Nick Hurran	Tom Butterworth & Chris Hurford	26 March 2015	0.87
The spinal tap to determine if Liam Sutter carries the same toxins as Shirley Allerdyce comes back negative. They discover both perpetrators had the same immune response which suggests a similar infectious agent. When Jules decides to flee with Liam, they discover Hildur has locked down the island in order to contain the outbreak and determine who has been infected. Jason Donnelly returns home, battered and bruised, but he refuses to give an account of his whereabouts. Morton heads out onto the glacier in search of Henry, who shoots him in the abdomen, saying he is sorry, while revealing that he is Anderssen's father. After pleas from Morton, Henry finally calls Anderssen before shooting himself in the head.
11	11	"Episode 11"	Sam Miller	Simon Donald	2 April 2015	0.82
Anderssen heads out onto the glacier in an attempt to rescue Morton. Nearly dead, Morton simply asks Anderssen to confess the truth to him. Through flashback, Anderssen reveals that a very drunk Pettigrew had picked a fight with Eric and ended up with his handcuffs. Anderssen discovers Pettigrew had handcuffed Elena to his bed in her hotel and then raped her. As Anderssen drove Pettigrew in his squad car, Pettigrew taunted him with details of the rape and accused Anderssen of wanting to do the same thing to her. Enraged, Anderssen took Pettigrew to the beach and handcuffed him to a pylon to suffer icy surf coming in, but a polar bear arrived and mauled him, before Henry Tyson sees him and shoots him in the head. Meanwhile, Rattrey suggests examining Stoddart's dog who was shot at the scene of his murder. A post-mortem examination reveals the dog ingested larvae found in Stoddart's remains. Going to see Dr. Allerdyce in hospital, he finds her body riddled with sores from which parasitic wasps emerge, and then a swarm explodes from her mouth as she dies, filling the ICU room.
12	12	"Episode 12"	Sam Miller	Simon Donald	9 April 2015	1.06
Rattrey is trapped. Yelburton quickly surmises that a host injected by eggs of these ancient and previously unknown wasps develops larvae and is compelled to deposit them into another host where the larvae mature into adult wasps. She, Rattrey, and Sheriff Anderssen work together to fill the room with gas, and Rattrey ignites it with a lighter to incinerate the wasps. He survives with bad burns. Meanwhile, Eric goes out in search of a stolen ice drill, and finds Yuri and Max out on the glacier. Max flees while Yuri and Eric have a standoff. Yuri explains that a "treasure" was located in the ice by Pettigrew and offers to share it with him. When Eric refuses, Yuri convinces him to fight him "man to man." Yuri eventually knocks him out, starts to lower himself down the drill shaft, only for the cable to fail and for him to fall down the drill shaft where he discovers a cave beneath the ice that contains a graveyard of thawing mammoth carcasses and buzzing wasps. Back in town, Jason finally reveals the location of the mammoth carcass and Ronnie Morgan's body. Elena shows signs of fever similar to Shirley's and handcuffs herself to her bed. Carrie unlocks the handcuffs only to be knocked out and then stabbed by an infected Elena. Anderssen shoots her despite his intense feelings.

=== Season 2 (2017) ===
No. overall	No. in series	Title	Directed by	Written by	Original release date	UK viewers (millions)
13	1	"Episode 1"	Hettie MacDonald	Simon Donald	26 January 2017	0.777
In a flashback to a night in the late 1940s with a "blood" Aurora over a Russian camp described as 60 km north of Fortitude, a Russian man discovers another in a tent. There are sounds of bones crunching, and the man in the tent turns to reveal he is devouring a baby. The first man shoots him, only for the man to rise again and walk past him outside. The enraged first man pursues him, shoots him again, but the man again rises and disappears. In present time, an older man in a bar in Fortitude mutters legends of cannibalism. When the bar closes, he wanders into the street under another "blood" aurora where he faces an unidentified man. The old man prostrates himself before this man. The next morning, Ingrid and Petra respond to a road traffic accident out on the glacier where a snowplow ran over a person lying on the road. Investigation leads to the discovery of a headless body. Forensic examination reveals that the angle of decapitation suggests that it could not have been an accident. As Ingrid and Petra try to identify the victim, Hildur is forced to take charge of the investigation in Anderssen and Eric's absence. Anderssen has disappeared and Eric has been searching the glacier for him or his body. Meanwhile, fisherman Michael Lennox has pitched up in Fortitude in the hope of collecting an incoming haul of rare Arctic King Crab worth upwards of $13 per pound. However, a fire on his vessel leads him to suspect that one of his rivals may have discovered his intended plan. Vincent announces that he is heading back home to London for good, but not before he reveals his true feelings for Natalie. Convinced that Sheriff Anderssen has died somewhere out on the glacier, Hildur sends out a search party to bring Eric home. Later, as Hildur and Eric drive to Fortitude together, they nearly run into a man standing in the road. When Eric confronts him, the man tries to bite his leg. After Eric subdues him, he discovers that the man is Anderssen.
14	2	"Episode 2"	Hettie MacDonald	Tom Butterworth & Chris Hurford	2 February 2017	0.350
Hildur is shocked to discover that she is to be replaced as governor of Fortitude by Erling Munk. The search for the glacier victim's missing head takes a surprising turn when Ingrid discovers a belt belonging to Rune Lennox in the victim's house. Michael and Markus are forced to join forces when a polar bear runs rampant in the local primary school. Vincent and Natalie later attempt to determine the cause of the animal's rage. As Hildur seeks to discover why her bosses are keen to oust her, Sheriff Anderssen continues to fight for his life. Meanwhile, attempting to use Tavrani as a source of information to discover how the decapitation may have taken place, Eric is surprised to find the victim's missing head upright in Tavrani's freezer, and Tavrani knocks him out.
15	3	"Episode 3"	Hettie MacDonald	Simon Burke	9 February 2017	0.330
Eric, Ingrid and Petra finally manage to track down Tavrani but he fails to provide them with any useful information as to who the killer might be. Meanwhile, Natalie and Vincent head out into the wilderness in an attempt to discover why a deer has been spotted eating the remains of a polar bear in the frigid wastes of the tundra. When a second headless victim is found out on the glacier, Munk angrily demands that Eric catch the killer. However, the killer's reign of terror continues to cause trouble when a burial site is ravaged for surviving organs. Whilst Tavrani is trapped in custody, a masked intruder forces his way into the station and uses a knife to remove Tavrani's tongue. Khatri orders a review of Anderssen's medical history in light of his miraculous recovery. Hildur struggles to adjust to life outside of government.
16	4	"Episode 4"	Kieron Hawkes	Simon Burke	16 February 2017	0.298
Hong Mankyo identifies the second headless victim found out on the glacier as his missing daughter, Bianca. Tavrani begins to recover in hospital but continues to refuse to identify who was responsible for the vicious attack on him. Hildur and Eric's relationship continues to crumble as it becomes apparent that Munk has ulterior motives for becoming acting governor. Michael offers Hildur assistance in retrieving communications from Munk's computer that could provide information as to why she was sacked. Vladek Klimov comes to Fortitude and reignites his friendship with Freya, Michael Lennox's wife, and she asks Vladek, a shaman, to heal her from her deadly neurodegenerative disease (amyotrophic lateral sclerosis, a.k.a. Lou Gehrig's disease). Natalie and Vincent's field trip continues to spiral when Vincent begins to suffer from a bout of hysterical blindness. Eric comes face to face with Anderssen for the first time since his miraculous recovery.
17	5	"Episode 5"	Kieron Hawkes	Simon Donald	23 February 2017	0.168
Just hours after his release from hospital, Tavrani is found dead of suspected heart failure. Later, during the memorial service for Bianca Mankyo, a hooded figure disrupts the mourners by sadistically taunting them with Tavrani's missing tongue. Eric and Michael give chase and are led into a mysterious lair where they find Bianca's missing head suspended from the ceiling in a yellow holdall. The man escapes, but not before Eric shoots him. Hildur is left a suspicious package in her hotel room, which contains film footage of an autopsy from 1942 in which the victim appears to return to life. Freya tends to Vladek Klimov's wound, revealing him to be the man Eric shot. Anderssen threatens Khatri to gain entry into the research facility to turn off Elena's life support machine but is shocked when she makes an unexpected recovery. Ingrid suspects that her mother has been harboring Vladek Klimov, the man suspected of being the murderer. Munk warns bartender Tomak that he is no longer prepared to support his activities, revealing the two to be conspiring and the latter being Bianca's murderer.
18	6	"Episode 6"	Metin Hüseyin	Simon Burke	2 March 2017	0.180
Khatri pressures Munk into diverting the police's attention to find Anderssen and Elena. Michael tries to convince Natalie and Vincent of the possibilities of full tissue regeneration with the evidence file and films from 1942. Hildur and Eric are forced to confront their feelings for one another but when Hildur tries to convince Eric of Munk's corruption, he refuses to believe her. Meanwhile, a large sinkhole appears on a highway out on the glacier, and Munk is reluctant to spend the town's resources on fixing it. Petra manages to track down Dan, who then manages to blackmail Khatri to secure his release from custody. Hildur decides to challenge Munk to find out the truth behind her removal as governor, but her efforts to lure him into a trap, resulting in his own downfall, and in her death at his hands.
19	7	"Episode 7"	Metin Hüseyin	Simon Donald	9 March 2017	0.215
Munk continues to cover up the events surrounding Hildur's death. As Freya's health begins to deteriorate, Michael goes in search of the weather station featured in the video from 1942 but discovers more than he bargained for when confronted by a lone Russian soldier. Munk urges Eric to step up the investigation and nail the killer before another victim is taken. Following a heart-to-heart with Vladek, Anderssen crushes Elena to death as he realizes he isn't his former self anymore. Natalie approaches Munk with evidence of Khatri's corruption but he refuses to investigate. Eric's suspicions begin to grow when it becomes apparent that Hildur has been unreachable for some time. When he receives news of a body found floating in a lake out on the glacier, he is heartbroken to discover that the victim is his estranged wife.
20	8	"Episode 8"	Kieron Hawkes	Simon Burke	16 March 2017	0.174
Two men stumble upon Vladek's shrine cave and are killed. Vincent and Ingrid wake up together. Dr. Khatri confronts a frightened Anderssen about his genetic changes, warning him he will experience uncontrollable violence and offers to cure him. Instead he takes over the murder investigations as Eric blames himself for Hildur's "suicide." Michael brings the female Russian soldier's body to Vincent. He tries to convince Eric that Hildur was murdered, but Eric again refuses to listen. Michael finally brings his suspicions to Ingrid and Petra, who hear him out. Terrified that Natalie knows about the tissue regeneration, Munk and Khatri conspire to steal all her evidence and poison her. Vladek finds Elena's body and burns it Viking style. Anderssen wakes up on Dr. Khatri's lab table but Vladek soon incapacitates her and retrieves the former sheriff.
21	9	"Episode 9"	Kieron Hawkes	Simon Donald	23 March 2017	0.152
In his shrine cave, Vladek forces Anderssen to take muscimol with him and then reveals the tupilaq. Freya arrives and burns it. Vladek escapes with an unconscious Freya while Michael and Ingrid arrive to save Anderssen from the fire. Vincent finds Natalie bleeding from the eyes, apparently infected. Michael and Ingrid discover where and how Hildur was murdered. Vladek castrates himself, cauterizes the wound and then turns himself in to Elena. Anderssen locks Petra in a cell, beats Vladek to death and then drags his body into the town hall. Michael confronts Munk at gunpoint and Munk promises to save Freya.
22	10	"Episode 10"	Kieron Hawkes	Simon Donald	30 March 2017	0.113
The extraction team arrives in Fortitude in search of Sheriff Dan Andersson. Natalie's condition worsens but when Vincent discovers that Dr. Khatri is leaving town, he is forced to take drastic action to potentially save his friend's life. Sheriff Andersson announces to the townspeople that Hildur was murdered and gives a chilling account of her death, naming Munk as her killer. As he allows the townspeople to carry out their own justice, Michael realizes that he is the only person who holds the key to saving his wife Freya. As Michael continues his search for answers, Eric comes to his rescue after he is shot by a member of the extraction team.

=== Season 3 (2018) ===
No. overall	No. in series	Title	Directed by	Written by	Original release date	UK viewers (millions)
23	1	"Episode 1"	Kieron Hawkes	Simon Donald	6 December 2018	N/A
Nine weeks after the previous events, detectives Ingemar Myklebust and Torsten Øby, from Oslo, are near concluding their investigation into Munk's death and other events in the town. Despite having no evidence to conclude it was murder, they reopen the case on the last day and begin re-interviewing the townspeople. In exchange for his testimony, the detectives have the schoolteacher Markus Huseklepp named Acting Governor. Michael Lennox, having descended into alcoholism after his wife Freya's death, drunkenly fires his rifle into the street. He is initially arrested but later released. Eric continues to mourn Hildur, infuriated that he did not personally avenge her. The elderly Elsa Schenthal travels to Fortitude from California with her husband Boyd and lover Larry. She has Boyd drain Larry's spinal fluid for a secret medical procedure, which rejuvenates her considerably by the evening. Meanwhile, Natalie has been blinded by the infection and reveals to Vincent that she kept one of the parasitic wasps in cryostatis and wants to infect herself in an attempt to regenerate her sight. The possessed Dan Anderssen recovers Dr. Khatri's corpse and her research data from the crashed helicopter remains and later kills Lars in his hunting cabin. When Myklebust and Øby arrive to question Lars, Dan shoots them and arranges the scene to appear that the three were killed in a shootout.
24	2	"Episode 2"	Kieron Hawkes	Simon Donald	13 December 2018	N/A
Elsa and Boyd discover that Dr. Khatri's body and the research their mercenaries took from the lab have gone missing from the crashed helicopter. Dan and Petra enter a sexual relationship and begin experimenting with his regenerative abilities. After telling Ingrid that Natalie has left Fortitude, Vincent finds the preserved wasp in the FARC and has it infect a restrained Natalie. She later breaks his nose when the parasite starts to take hold. Dan begins having hallucinations of Hildur. The police respond to the shooting at Lars' cabin, where Petra notices that Øby is still alive, although he dies shortly thereafter. As Dr. Adebimpe expresses doubt that Lars was shot dead as Dan orchestrated it to appear, schoolteacher Markus Huseklepp appears on the scene and enforces his new position as Governor and Chief of Police to take over. Elsa Schenthal seduces Michael Lennox and gets him drunk, allowing her husband Boyd to kidnap him. Elsa meets with Dan, revealing her company Schenthal Biotech has developed other infection victims with regenerative abilities. She is the longest living, having been infected 73 years prior. The majority of infected victims die within a few years but she has been able to prolong the regenerative process via frequent intake of new Neuroendocrine cells from human cerebral spinal fluid. Michael releases his restraints using a Swiss Army knife, and appears to fatally shoot Boyd in the chest before escaping.
25	3	"Episode 3"	Kieron Hawkes	Simon Donald	20 December 2018	N/A
A hallucinating Dan confesses to Markus about killing Lars and the two detectives and orchestrating the crime scene, to which Markus seems unconcerned. Markus later visits Eric, telling him Oslo has ended the investigation into the shooting and that he has 48 hours to vacate the Governor's residence. Boyd, having survived being shot but fatally wounded, demands that Elsa takes his spinal fluid instead of trying to save him. Annie Burgess, Myklebust's partner, arrives in Fortitude and begins her own investigation using her skills as a forensic pathologist. After breaking into the mortuary she is able to hide as Dan enters and steals Myklebust's corpse. Natalie claims that the control element of the infection has passed and demands she be untied. Vincent remains unconvinced and refuses. When Ingrid doesn't believe his story about the kidnapping, Michael returns to Elsa's remote cabin with a gun but she disarms him with alcohol. After telling him about how she survives on the stem cells in spinal fluid and promising she can cure him of his alcoholism, the two sleep with each other and go about disposing of Boyd's body. Ingrid hears Natalie screaming from Vincent's basement but he is able to convince her otherwise after she enters his house and the two have sex. Elsa manages to access Dr. Khatri's voice notes, which state those with the infection also develop severe psychotic delusions and psychiatric breakdown. It is implied that Michael, Ralfi and Markus are suffering from such delusions. Elsa discovers Natalie in Vincent's basement.
26	4	"Episode 4"	Kieron Hawkes	Simon Donald	27 December 2018	N/A
Elsa relocates Natalie to her cabin to continue experimenting on her. Whilst dining at the Governors residence, Dan spikes Markus's drink with Muscimol, then castrates him. Ingrid discovers Vincent's abandoned basement and arrests him, however his interrogation by Dan and Eric is interrupted by Annie Burgess. She tells Eric that due to a compound fracture, Myklebust had recently retrained to shoot left handed, yet the gunshot residue-stained glove recovered from the scene of her death was from her right hand. She then tells Eric she believes Dan set up the scene and stole Myklebust's body from the mortuary, questioning his sanity. The two later raid Dan's residence, finding Myklebust's body, a badly injured Vincent and a depraved shrine of corpses in the bathroom. Elsa's body begins to deteriorate due to scorbutic liquefaction, but she believes that undergoing a transfusion with the infected Natalie may definitively save her. However, Michael instead drives her to the airport, informs Ingrid of Natalie's location, and tells Elsa he plans to take her to a hospice in Bergen where she can die in peace instead of killing more people. Dan breaks into Elsa's cabin and rescues Natalie, whose eyesight has been restored. However the parasite is still active in her and she bludgeons him with a hammer and cuts him open. The police arrive at the cabin to find Natalie vomiting the larvae into Dan's body, but are able to prevent her from being shot by Petra. In the ambulance, a dying Dan hallucinates first Hildur, and then being handcuffed by Billy Pettigrew to a pylon as he did to him at the start of the series. He then hallucinates Henry Tyson, who tells him that shaman folklore states you must be guided into the next life by someone who loves you, but there is no such person for Dan due to the atrocities he has committed. On a plane headed for the mainland with Michael, an unresponsive Elsa's eyes begin to bleed.

== Reception ==
The first season received positive reviews from critics. On Review aggregator Rotten Tomatoes, the first season has an 86% rating with an average score rating of 7.4 out of 10 based on 28 critic reviews. The critical consensus reads "Fortitude's fine cast, deliberate pacing, and chilling setting provide the show with more than enough of the titular quality." On Metacritic, the first season has a score of 75 out of 100, based on 15 critic reviews, which indicates "generally favorable reviews".

The second season received generally positive reviews. On Rotten Tomatoes, the season has an 88% approval rating with an average rating of 6.7 out of 10 based on 8 reviews.

== International broadcast ==
In the United States and Canada, the series premiered on 29 January 2015 (the same date as the UK) on Pivot and Super Channel, respectively. It was also dubbed in Farsi and aired by Manoto. The series debuted in Australia on 15 February 2015 on ABC. Ale Kino+ HD started showing series 3 on 10 February 2019 dubbed in Polish, with original English audio also available.

=== Censorship ===
When FX broadcast the series in Indonesia on 19 February 2017, the violent scenes led to the banning of the channel by Indonesian authorities from 10 to 14 April 2017.
