= Martin Suter =

Swiss author (born 1948)

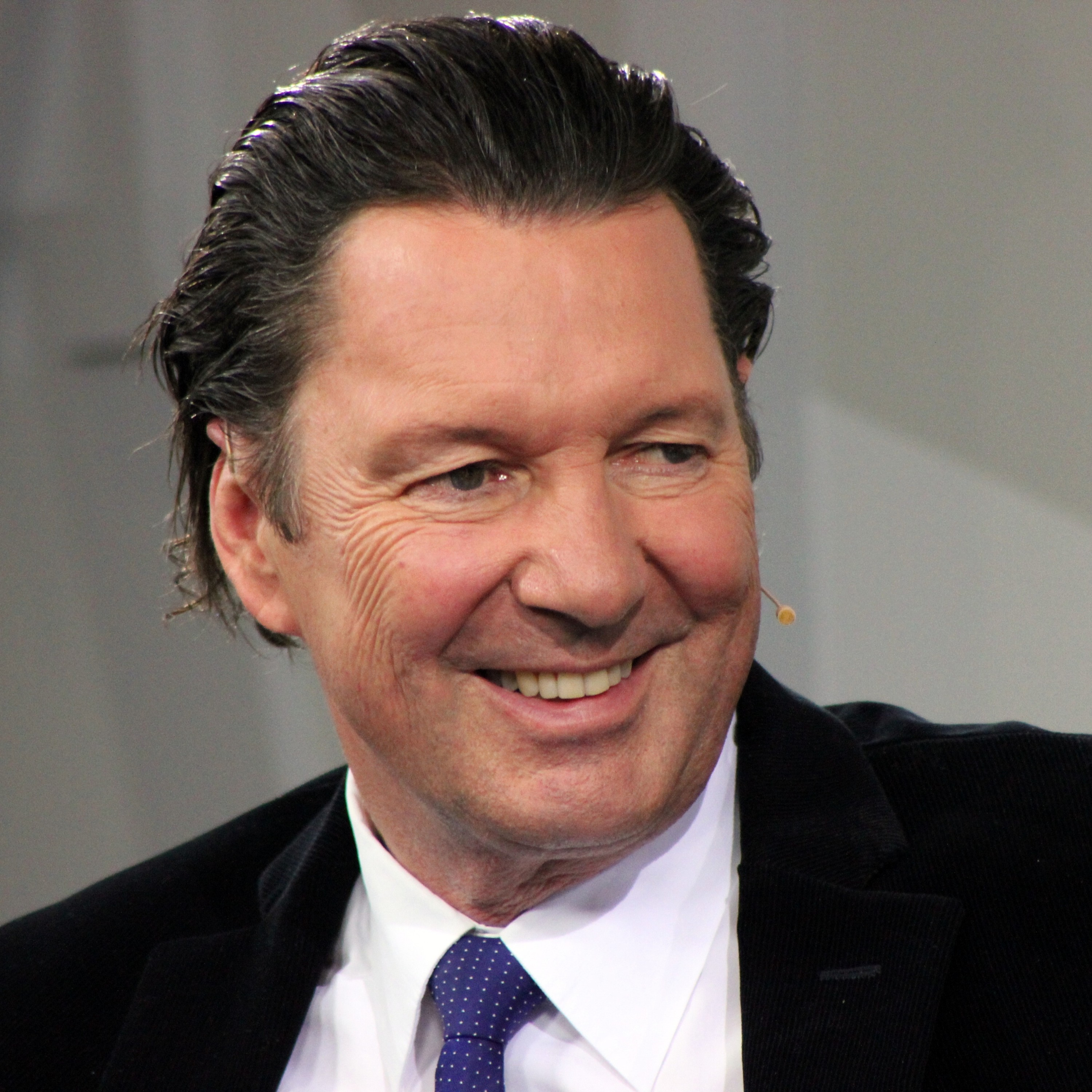
Suter at the Frankfurt Book Fair in 2012

Martin Suter (born 29 February 1948 in Zürich) is a Swiss author. He became known for his weekly column Business Class in the Weltwoche newspaper (1992–2004), now appearing in the Tages-Anzeiger, and another column appearing in "NZZ Folio". The columns have been published as nine books.

Suter has published fourteen novels, written four stage plays, and seven screenplays, for which he received various awards.

He is married and lives in Spain and Guatemala.

Suter worked previously as a copywriter and creative director in advertising before he decided to fully concentrate on his writing career in 1991. He achieved his break-through with his novel Small World in 1997, which was published by Diogenes Verlag.

== Works ==
- Small World, novel, 1997. Small World, transl. by Sandra Harper. London, Harvill, 2001, ISBN 1860469272. (film : Small World)
- Beresina oder Die letzten Tage der Schweiz (Beresina, or the Last Days of Switzerland, directed by Daniel Schmid), screenplay, 1999
- Business Class, collected columns, 2000
- Die dunkle Seite des Mondes (The Dark Side of the Moon), novel, 2000
- Ein perfekter Freund (A Perfect Friend), novel, 2002
- Lila, Lila (Violet, Violet), novel, 2004
- Huber spannt aus (Huber relaxes), collected columns, 2005
- Der Teufel von Mailand, novel, 2006. A Deal with the Devil, transl. by Peter Millar. London, Arcadia Books, 2007, ISBN 978-1-90514-752-6.
- Der letzte Weynfeldt, novel, 2008. The Last Weynfeldt, transl. by Steph Morris, New York, New Vessel Press, 2016, ISBN 978-1-939931-27-6.
- Der Koch, novel, 2010. The Chef, transl. by Jamie Bulloch. London, Atlantic Books, 2013, ISBN 978-1-78239-061-9.
- Allmen und die Libellen, novel, 2010, Allmen and the Dragonflies, transl. by Steph Morris, New York, New Vessel Press, 2018 ISBN 978-1-939931-57-3.
- Allmen und der rosa Diamant (Allmen and the Pink Diamond), novel, 2011
- Abschalten, 2012
- Die Zeit, Die Zeit, novel, 2012
- Allmen und die Dahlien (Allmen and the Dahlias), novel, 2013
- Allmen und die verschwundene María (Allmen and the Vanished Maria), novel, 2014
- Montecristo, novel, 2015. Montecristo, transl. by Jamie Bulloch. Harpenden (Herts), No Exit Press, 2016, ISBN 978-1-84344-830-3.
- Elefant, novel, 2017, Elefant, transl. by Jamie Bulloch, London, Fourth Estate, 2018 ISBN 978-0-00826-431-4.
- Allmen und die Erotik, novel, 2018
- Allmen und der Koi, novel, 2019
- Alle sind so ernst geworden (with Benjamin von Stuckrad-Barre), novel, 2020
