= Harlots (TV series) =

2010s British period drama TV series

- Genre: Period drama
- Created by: Alison Newman; Moira Buffini
- Based on: The Covent Garden Ladies by Hallie Rubenhold
- Starring: Samantha Morton; Lesley Manville; Jessica Brown Findlay; Dorothy Atkinson; Pippa Bennett-Warner; Kate Fleetwood; Holli Dempsey; Douggie McMeekin; Edward Hogg; Richard McCabe; Danny Sapani; Hugh Skinner; Eloise Smyth; Liv Tyler; Sebastian Armesto; Julian Rhind-Tutt
- Composer: Rael Jones
- Countries of origin: United Kingdom; United States
- Original language: English
- No. of series: 3
- No. of episodes: 24

Production
- Executive producers: Alison Owen; Debra Hayward; Moira Buffini; Alison Newman
- Producers: Elizabeth Binns; Alison Carpenter; Lawrence Till
- Production locations: London, England; Hertfordshire, England
- Cinematography: Simon Archer; Hubert Taczanowski; Ollie Downey
- Running time: 44–50 minutes
- Production company: Monumental Pictures

Original release
- Network: ITV Encore StarzPlay (UK); Hulu (US)
- Release: 27 March 2017 – 28 August 2019

Harlots is a period drama television series created by Alison Newman and Moira Buffini and inspired by The Covent Garden Ladies by British historian Hallie Rubenhold. The series focuses on Margaret Wells, who runs a brothel in 18th-century London and struggles to secure a better future for her daughters in an unpredictable environment.

The series premiered on 27 March 2017 on ITV Encore in the United Kingdom, and on 29 March 2017 on Hulu in the United States. It was subsequently renewed for a second series that premiered on 11 July 2018 in the United States, and on 14 February 2019 in the UK via on-demand service StarzPlay, to which it moved after ITV Encore closed. On September 24, 2018, Harlots was renewed for a third season, which premiered in the United States on July 10, 2019, and in the UK the following day. On June 10, 2020, it was reported that Hulu had cancelled the series after three seasons. After this, the BBC acquired the UK rights to broadcast all three series, with the first two episodes of the first season aired on BBC Two on 5 August 2020.

== Plot ==
In 1760s London, women's opportunities for economic advancement are either through marriage or prostitution. The city's brothels are run by canny and determined businesswomen, such as Margaret Wells and Lydia Quigley, but there is a new morality on the rise. Religious evangelists demand the closure of brothels and the police are happy to launch brutal raids.

The show revolves around Wells' determination to improve her life and the lives of those in her "family" by moving her brothel to Greek Street in Soho to serve a wealthier clientele in Georgian society. Her move to Greek Street puts her into direct conflict with a rival madame, Lydia Quigley, for whom she had previously worked. Quigley operates an elite brothel in Golden Square that serves rich, influential people.

== Cast and characters ==
=== Main (Note: Actors credited among the main cast only in the episodes in which they appear.) ===
- Samantha Morton as Margaret Wells, the intelligent and strategic madam of an up-and-coming brothel who is determined to improve her fortune; a former sex worker of Lydia Quigley's
- Lesley Manville as Lydia Quigley, the ruthless madam of a posh brothel with clients from the judiciary, nobility, and upper echelons of Georgian society
- Jessica Brown Findlay as Charlotte Wells, the elder daughter of Margaret Wells and a witty courtesan who is coveted by society's elite
- Eloise Smyth as Lucy Wells, the younger and favoured daughter of Margaret Wells, and a reluctant sex worker who earns an arrangement with Lord Fallon
- Dorothy Atkinson as Florence Scanwell, a religious zealot who opposes sex work and becomes a pawn for Lydia Quigley
- Pippa Bennett-Warner as Harriet Lennox, a slave of Nathaniel Lennox (a former lover of Margaret Wells) who is brought to England as his "wife" and mother of two children, and becomes a sex worker for Margaret Wells
- Kate Fleetwood as Nancy Birch, a longtime friend and neighbour of Margaret Wells, whose sex work specialty is bondage and domination
- Holli Dempsey as Emily Lacey, a fiery, opinionated and impulsive sex worker who deserts Margaret Wells for what she believes are better prospects at Lydia Quigley's brothel. Emily is the love interest of Charles Quigley
- Douggie McMeekin as Charles Quigley, the inept son and aide of Lydia Quigley who takes a liking to Emily Lacey (season 1–2)
- Edward Hogg as Thomas Haxby, the estate manager of the house where Sir George Howard has Charlotte Wells live (season 1)
- Richard McCabe as Justice Cunliffe, a judge in the employ of the Spartans, a shady society of elite gentlemen pursuing pleasure, rape and murder (season 1)
- Danny Sapani as William North, the loving partner and common law husband of Margaret Wells, and a father figure to Charlotte and Lucy, who was born a free Black man in England to a woman who was a slave
- Hugh Skinner as Sir George Howard, an aspiring Member of Parliament who has an arrangement with Charlotte Wells to receive her exclusive services (season 1)
- Sebastian Armesto as Josiah Hunt (season 2)
- Liv Tyler as Lady Isabella Fitzwilliam (season 2–3)
- Julian Rhind-Tutt as Harcourt Fitzwilliam, Marquess of Blayne, the Archon of the Spartans (season 2-3)
- Anna Calder-Marshall as Mrs. May, a retired bawd, once the mistress of Lydia Quigley's late father, who acts alternatively as a mother-like figure to Lydia, as well as being her casually cruel corruptor and tormentor (season 2-3).
- Daisy Head as Kate Bottomley (season 3), a young woman sent to an insane asylum by her conservative family when they catch her in the climax of sexual passion with a boyfriend. In the asylum, Kate develops an unlikely mother-daughter bond with Lydia Quigley.

=== Recurring ===
- Francesca Mills as Cherry Dorrington, a sex worker with dwarfism (series 2-3)
- Roy Beck as Mr. Abbadon
- Rosalind Eleazar as Violet Cross, a Black sex worker and adept thief who works for Nancy Birch
- Rory Fleck Byrne as Daniel Marney (series 1)
- Tim McInnerny as Lord Repton (series 1)
- Fenella Woolgar as Lady Repton (series 1)
- Con O'Neil as Nathaniel Lennox, a plantation and slave owner who is a former lover of Margaret Wells (series 1)
- Bronwyn James as Fanny Lambert, a full-figured and good natured sex worker for Margaret Wells
- Jordon Stevens as Amelia Scanwell, the daughter of Florence Scanwell
- Alexa Davies as Betsey Fletcher, a sex worker who works for Nancy Birch (series 1)
- Poppy Corby-Tuech as Marie-Louise D'Aubigne, a French-speaking sex worker in Lydia Quigley's house who decides to work for Margaret Wells (series1)
- Josef Altin as Prince Rasselas, a molly boy who is an informant for Lydia Quigley (Series 1-2)
- Jordan A. Nash as Jacob Wells North, the young son of Margaret Wells and William North
- Ellie Heydon as Anne Pettifer, one of Lydia Quigley's girls
- Steven Robertson as Robert Oswald
- Timothy Innes as Benjamin Lennox, the eldest child from Nathaniel's former marriage
- Ziggy Heath as Sam Holland
- Hannah Dodd as Sophia Fitzwilliam, Lady Isabella's daughter who was conceived when her mother was raped by her brother (Series 2-3)
- Ben Lambert as Lord Fallon, an aristocrat who takes an interest in Lucy Wells.
- Gerard Monaco as Mr. Armitage
- Sean Hart as Sir Christopher Rutledge
- Amy Dawson as Mary Cooper (series 1)
- Eleanor Yates as Lady Caroline Howard, the wealthy wife of Sir George Howard who uses his dalliances to her advantage. (series 1)
- Lottie Tolhurst as Kitty Carter, a sex worker for Margaret Wells
- Sheila Atim as Limehouse Nell (season 2)
- Eric Kofi-Abrefa as Noah Webster (season 2)
- Angela Griffin as Elizabeth Harvey (Series 3)
- Tom Fisher as Dr. Swinton (Series 3)
- Lex Shrapnel as Lord James Croft (Season 3)
- Jack Greenlees as Justice Stuart Knox, new Justice in town. (Series 3)
- Aidan Cheng as Fredo Harvey (Series 3)
- Alfie Allen as Isaac Pincher (Series 3)
- Ash Hunter as Hal Pincher (Series 3)
- Luke Elkins as Young Boxer (Series 3)

=== Guest ===
- Stephen Beckett as Mr. Lynch
- John Lynch as Jonas Young
- Michael Simkins as Justice Poulson
- Nicola Coughlan as Hannah Dalton

== Episodes ==
Series	Episodes	Originally released	
Series	Episodes	First released	Last released
1	8	27 March 2017	15 May 2017
2	8	11 July 2018	22 August 2018
3	8	10 July 2019	28 August 2019

=== Series 1 (2017) ===
No. overall	No. in series	Title	Directed by	Written by	Original release date	US release date
1	1	"Episode 1"	Coky Giedroyc	Moira Buffini	27 March 2017	29 March 2017
Brothel owner Margaret Wells plans to prosper her business by owning a house in London's Greek Street. Her youngest daughter Lucy, harlots Kitty Carter, Fannie Lambert and the disgruntled Emily Lacy live with Margaret's lover William North and their young son Jacob. Her childhood friend, the fiercely loyal Nancy Birch, specializes in flagellation at her house. Well-connected rival madam Lydia Quigley, who exploited Margaret and Nancy as children and mother of spoiled man-child Charles, enlists constables to ransack Margaret's brothel. After paying a huge £100 fine, Margaret cannot make the final payment on her new house. She plans to auction Lucy's virginity to the highest bidder, just as she did with her eldest daughter Charlotte, who is now the most glamorous courtesan in London. The buffoonish Sir George Howard expects Charlotte to sign a contract to formally become her "keeper", but she refuses. In a fit of jealousy, he successfully bids for Lucy's virginity. Charlotte makes the acquaintance of an aspiring male harlot, charming Irishman Daniel Marney. Emily Lacey deserts Margaret to work for Lydia but instantly regrets it.
2	2	"Episode 2"	Coky Giedroyc	Moira Buffini	3 April 2017	5 April 2017
Margaret discovers one of Lydia's former girls, Mary Cooper, on the streets dying of French pox and plans to use her as revenge on Lydia. On the behest of Justice Cunliffe, Lydia manipulates and procures a virgin girl for a secret group of wealthy men referred to as "The Spartans" so that they can rape her. Margaret's former lover, plantation and slave owner Nathaniel Lennox, returns from America with his enslaved mistress, Harriet, their two biracial children and his disdainful adult son by his late wife, Benjamin. Nathaniel agrees to invest in her new brothel. Sir George leaves his pompous servant, Haxby, to guard his property, including Charlotte. Lucy's virginity is sold twice. Lydia fears the girl she kidnapped may have been killed.
3	3	"Episode 3"	Coky Giedroyc	Cat Jones	10 April 2017	12 April 2017
Margaret's move to the Greek Street house is initially thwarted by a group of Lydia's thugs. Nathaniel Lennox suddenly dies, revealing that he never signed Harriet's freedom papers and she is ejected from the house by Benjamin, who spitefully keeps her children to be sold in America. Lucy is hired to spend a few days with the sadistic Lord and Lady Repton at their country estate and finds herself out of her depth. Sir George's wife tries to curb his wasteful spending but Charlotte is indifferent to money. Lydia has left the corpse of Mary Cooper as a surprise in Margaret's new house, a dismal beginning. Emily Lacey, locked into her room and unable to escape, is starved into submitting to Lydia's most feared and abusive client, Mr. Osborne, though Charles feebly tries to protect her. Justice Cunliffe is looking for a new, virgin girl for his aristocratic clients, but Lydia is reluctant to provide him one without some assurances.
4	4	"Episode 4"	China Moo-Young	Debbie O'Malley	17 April 2017	19 April 2017
Margaret's business suffers from blind religious crusader Mrs. Scanwell's endless tirades, ordered under duress by Lydia, who eyes Scanwell's innocent daughter Amelia with sinister intent. Charlotte suggests a masquerade party to improve the business and goes seeking wealthy guests, especially the arrogant Lord Fallon. Lucy is failing to thrive in her new role, can't attract a keeper and her confidence plummets. Emily tries to flee and rejoin Margaret's brothel but Margaret refuses to forgive her. The masquerade attracts many unexpected guests and girls and Lucy scores her first public success. Amelia Scanwell, befriended by harlot and pickpocket Violet Cross, joins the party for a glimpse of Margaret's brothel. Desperate to earn enough money to buy her children back from Benjamin, Harriet uses her charms on Lord Repton to promote herself to harlot. Charles foolishly brings some of Lydia's courtesans to the masquerade and one of them deviates to work for Margaret. The rift between Charlotte and Sir George widens due to jealous spite, and he has sex with Lucy. In response, Charlotte impulsively has sex with Haxby. Charles stands up to his mother and bans Osborne from her brothel. Lydia finds and imprisons another virgin for The Spartans in exchange for one of their names, Lord Fallon.
5	5	"Episode 5"	China Moo-Young	Jane English	24 April 2017	26 April 2017
The wildly successful masquerade party leaves Margaret's coffers flush, and she visits Lydia to offer a truce and settle the debts of the girl who deserted her at the masquerade. Beaten bloody by Lydia, Emily manages to escape the brothel by drugging Charles with laudanum, nearly killing him, but has nowhere to go. Charlotte is desperate to attract a new keeper, while Sir George's outrageous behavior escalates to violence and social scandal when Charlotte tries to leave him. Harriet excels in her new position, but Benjamin puts an impossible price on her children and plans to leave for America soon. Lydia is now certain that the Spartans are murdering their victims. Lord Fallon wishes to be Lucy's keeper, to the delight of Margaret, but his strange aggression alarms Lucy and she refuses. Violet and Amelia continue to meet secretly as their mutual attraction must be concealed from Mrs. Scanwell. Emily, sought by a vengeful Lydia, is sheltered by the tough but kindhearted Nancy Birch. Lydia refuses to procure more girls when she realizes Justice Cunliffe is just a lackey.
6	6	"Episode 6"	China Moo-Young	Moira Buffini	1 May 2017	3 May 2017
Benjamin demands immediate repayment on the loan his father gave the brothel and plans to leave for Virginia with the children. The money from the masquerade would be enough, but Harriet's share is insufficient to buy her children back. Charlotte has left Sir George, penniless, and wishes for the freedom of America with Daniel Marney. Lydia is spying on Margaret's brothel night and day for signs of Emily Lacey. Fanny confides in Kitty that she is pregnant and too far gone for an abortion. Enraged with Charlotte, Sir George furiously demands to be Lucy's keeper, promising to pay Margaret handsomely to take her immediately. An unwilling Lucy defends herself from Sir George's attack and Margaret finishes him off to keep her daughter safe, putting all of the house occupants in danger. Lydia recaptures Emily after Margaret betrays her whereabouts to gain time to save Lucy. William, Nancy and an unaware Jacob dispose of Sir George. Mrs. Scanwell confesses her past as a sex worker to Amelia in an effort to break free from Lydia, to no avail, as Lydia threatens Amelia instead. Charlotte and Daniel try to recover her money from Sir George's house but Haxby fights them off and is knocked down. Lydia is back to providing girls as high priestesses to the Spartans, who have grown more bloodthirsty.
7	7	"Episode 7"	Jill Robertson	Cat Jones	8 May 2017	10 May 2017
Sir George is found murdered and Charlotte and Daniel are arrested, slandered by Haxby. Things fall apart for Margaret as William and Jacob have disappeared, and her harlots rebel. Lydia has imprisoned Emily Lacey in a warehouse with foul intentions but Charles has forgiven Emily and frees her before she can become the Spartans' next victim. Daniel fears Charlotte might betray him to escape prison but she refuses to abandon him. Mrs. Scanwell seeks an alliance with Margaret to save Amelia from Lydia's threats. Justice Cunliffe seeks membership in The Spartans behind Lydia's back. William promises to help Harriet get her children back but Harriet blackmails Margaret for the money regardless. Lydia suspects Sir George was murdered at Margaret's brothel and forces Amelia to make a false statement against Margaret to Justice Cunliffe. Fanny is about to give birth.
8	8	"Episode 8"	Jill Robertson	Moira Buffini and Jane English	15 May 2017	17 May 2017
Lydia wants Charlotte to abandon her mother and come to Golden Square instead. Sir George's widow, now happily rid of him, sides with Charlotte over Haxby and arranges Daniel's freedom. Justice Cunliffe betrays Lydia for acceptance by The Spartans, who demand a fresh victim. William and Harriet team up to recover her children, and Benjamin returns to America without his extortion money. Emily Lacey conspires with Charles against his mother and they find a new independence together. Margaret is blackmailed by Cunliffe to abduct Amelia for the Spartans, but Amelia voluntarily helps to set a trap for him. Lydia does a double cross for Justice Cunliffe, who is murdered by Lord Fallon, witnessed by a terrified molly boy. Charlotte appears to disown Margaret and Daniel to remain with Lydia, but she reveals to Daniel that she aims to take down Lydia's brothel. Fanny gives birth to a daughter, comforted by Kitty, who longs for a daughter of her own. Lucy remains at her mother's brothel, the last remnants of her girlhood gone.

=== Series 2 (2018) ===
No. overall	No. in series	Title	Directed by	Written by	Original release date
9	1	"Episode 1"	Coky Giedroyc	Moira Buffini	11 July 2018
Charlotte settles into life at Lydia Quigley's house, while secretly plotting against her. Lydia Quigley is imprisoned. Margaret kicks Harriet and her children out of her house, as she suspects that Harriet wants to be with William. Margaret and William's marriage continues to crumble in the wake of the murder of George Howard. Kitty is murdered.
10	2	"Episode 2"	Coky Giedroyc	Cat Jones	11 July 2018
The women all react to Kitty's murder. Charlotte bails Lydia Quigley out of jail. Nancy is arrested and flogged.
11	3	"Episode 3"	Coky Giedroyc	Jane English	18 July 2018
Lydia Quigley is no longer allowed to conduct her business at Golden Square. Emily Lacey tries to organize a competing brothel with Charles where she is the head bawd. At a party at Pleasure Gardens, Margaret punches and knocks down Lydia. Lucy walks into the house of Lord Fallon to become his kept woman.
12	4	"Episode 4"	Philippa Langdale	Emer Kenny	25 July 2018
Lydia is no longer running her business but gains a powerful protector in the head justice, whom she has sex with in order to have him approve of her boarding house.
13	5	"Episode 5"	Philippa Langdale	Jane English	1 August 2018
Charlotte goes along with Quigley, who entraps a poor virgin girl and forces her into prostitution, where her first sexual encounter will be sold to the highest bidder. Charlotte tries to save the girl, and devises a plan whereby Noah Webster will disguise himself as a wealthy businessman, and they will pay him enough money to buy her, and then, instead of taking her virginity, they will free her. However, Lydia realises the ruse, throws Noah out, and awards the Marquess of Blayne the "honour" of taking the girl's virginity.
14	6	"Episode 6"	Philippa Langdale	Moira Buffini	8 August 2018
Rasselas tells Charlotte that Lord Fallon was responsible for the murder of Justice Cunliffe. This is overheard by one of Lydia's courtesans, who tells both Lydia and Lord Fallon. Lord Fallon runs after Rasselas to murder him, but just as he is about to stab him, Amelia Scanwell is inadvertently stabbed instead. Isabella reveals to Charlotte that she has a secret, illegitimate child who she sends to a boarding school away from them. Meanwhile, Margaret Wells, in order to protect Lucy from being blackmailed by Lord Fallon, confesses that she is the one who murdered Sir George.
15	7	"Episode 7"	Jill Robertson	Cat Jones	15 August 2018
In a court hearing, Lucy provides an alibi for Lord Fallon, who walks free and has the charges of stabbing Amelia Scanwell dropped. Margaret Wells is scheduled to hang, but in the middle of the execution, Josiah Hunt changes his mind and stops the hanging and instead transports her to America.
16	8	"Episode 8"	Jill Robertson	Moira Buffini	22 August 2018
William North and Harriet Lennox attempt to search for Margaret Wells' body, but turn up empty handed. They confront Josiah Hunt, who admits that Margaret was not executed, but was instead shipped to America. Lydia is committed to Bedlam by her son. Lord Fallon attempts to kill a recovering Amelia Scanwell, but is captured by Nancy, Charlotte, and Violet. Lord Fallon is later found and rescued by the Marquess of Blayne, but is persuaded into suicide, leaving a signed confession to murder and the attack on Amelia, so that their secret gentlemen's club can continue.

=== Series 3 (2019) ===
No. overall	No. in series	Title	Directed by	Written by	Original release date
17	1	"Episode 1"	Robin Sheppard	Moira Buffini	July 10, 2019
A year after the events of series two, new pimps come to town in the form of the Pincher brothers, Isaac and Hal, the new owners of the Scaracen's Head tavern. While Charlotte retaliates against the Pinchers' attempts to take over London's bawdy houses, Emily Lacy becomes Hal's mistress, which Isaac resents. Lucy tries to branch out on her own by joining forces with the beguiling Mrs. Elizabeth Harvey and her adopted son, Fredo, to establish a gentleman's tailoring business that will provide cover for a molly-house. The dissolute Charles Quigley has lost his mother's house at Golden Square and Lucy and her new partners buy it, incurring a heavy debt. In Bedlam, Lydia Quigley continues to suffer Charles' abandonment and the experimental "treatments" of her doctors.
18	2	"Episode 2"	Robin Sheppard	Jessica Ruston	July 17, 2019
After Isaac Pincher sets fire to Charlotte's house on Greek Street, she and the girls are determined for revenge. Lucy suggests a diversion to Mrs. Harvey that allows them to put their business on display while giving Nancy cover to steal the Pinchers' money. With the Pinchers defeated, the warring forces call a truce and Isaac and Charlotte begin a passionate affair. Lydia makes a friend in Bedlam with the arrival of a lovely young woman, Kate Bottomley, betrayed by her family over her first love affair. The two make a daring escape from Bedlam and take refuge with Mrs. May, Lydia's former bawd.
19	3	"Episode 3"	Robin Sheppard	Jane English	July 24, 2019
William arranges a boxing match for Jack, which is the talk of the town, as Lady Isabella has agreed to host the match at her house. Margaret returns to London, now married to landowner Jonas Young from America. She reunites with her family, with Jonas' uncomfortable blessing, and encourages them to go to America with her. Lydia and Kate are tested by Mrs. May's heartless and stingy nature. The boxing match is a crowded spectacle which even Mrs. Quigley and Kate attend. Away from the crowd, the Pincher brothers fight over Charlotte, accidentally pushing her off a staircase. She is discovered dying by Mrs. Quigley and Kate but no one witnesses her fall.
20	4	"Episode 4"	Chloë Thomas	Moira Buffini	July 31, 2019
The magistrate is called in to investigate and the Wells hides Margaret from him, as she is nearly insensible with grief. Isaac is deeply distraught and begins to unravel. In her first outing as a harlot, Kate is steered by the Marquess of Blayne toward the crown Prince, an almost surreal opportunity, but the meeting is a failure due to her reserve. Lydia sends Kate to Cherry to learn vulgarity to improve her chances. Lydia finally responds to Mrs. May's harshness with hate and finds herself an unexpected fortune. At the wake for Charlotte at Lady Isabella's house, many come to pay their respects, but not all are welcome. Lydia Quigley sees Margaret through a window and realizes that she is still alive.
21	5	"Episode 5"	Chloë Thomas	Vivienne Harvey	August 7, 2019
Lydia realizes that she has leverage over Margaret and plots how to use it. Discovering the truth through Emily Lacey, the Pincher brothers blackmail Jonas into selling them his land at a ruinous price. Isaac convinces Hal to flip that land to another buyer and they make a small fortune. Quigley convinces the Marquess of Blayne to give Kate another chance with the Prince, which is successful thanks to her session with Cherry. Isaac agrees to give money to Emily Lacey so she can leave London, but Emily fears that she might be killed instead, and brings Margaret and Nancy along to the meeting, who suspect Isaac of Charlotte's murder. Isaac wildly threatens the women with a pistol, shooting at Emily, only to be shot dead by Nancy instead. Rosamund, a rival of Emily, witnesses the women fleeing the scene.
22	6	"Episode 6"	Chloë Thomas	Jessica Ruston	August 14, 2019
Emily, Margaret and Nancy all struggle with Isaac's death. Hal is raging with grief over Isaac's death and Emily is blackmailed by Rosamund. Jack is kidnapped and held by slavers bound for America. William and Harriet rally the neighborhood to search for him and the other victims, but Harriet is tricked into captivity alongside Jack instead. Margaret leaves London with Jonas to return to America and wants to take Lucy with her, but she declines. Hal confides to Emily that he was the one who killed Charlotte, albeit accidentally.
23	7	"Episode 7"	Debs Paterson	Moira Buffini	August 21, 2019
Kate becomes the mistress of the Prince and tries to warn him that Blayne is not who he seems. Ann Pettifer has given birth to the Marquess' son, and is immediately amthrown away by him. Mrs. Harvey turns out to be hiding mountains of debt, which Lydia uses to have Lucy thrown into debtor's prison to keep her from exposing Blayne. Lady Isabella kidnaps Blayne's son and hides him with Ann in order to gain leverage over her brother.
24	8	"Episode 8"	Debs Paterson	Moira Buffini and Jane English	August 28, 2019
Ann Pettifer is bullied into selling her baby to Blayne but is immediately robbed and brutally slashed across the face by one of his men. William rescues Jack and Harriet from being shipped overseas into slavery, which Hal had been secretly orchestrating. Emily Lacy turns Hal over to a navy press gang and takes over the tavern for herself, ejecting Rosamund. Lady Isabella, Ann and Kate confide in the Prince about Blayne's many crimes and the Prince terminates Blayne's governorship. Mrs. Harvey eventually agrees to take Lucy's place in debtor's prison, and Lucy heads off to confront Lydia. In a final confrontation with the Marquess at Golden Square, Lucy and Lydia become unlikely partners.

== Production ==
=== Development ===
On 26 May 2016, it was announced that Hulu and ITV had given the co-production a programme order for a first series consisting of eight episodes. The series was set to be written by Moira Buffini and based upon an original idea by Buffini and Alison Newman. Directors were expected to include Coky Giedroyc and China Moo-Young. Lawrence Till was set as producer, with Alison Owen and Debra Hayward also on board to executive produce alongside Alison Carpenter, Buffini, and Newman. Production companies involved with the series include Monumental Pictures.

On 27 July 2017, it was announced at the annual Television Critics Association summer press tour that the programme had been renewed for a second series. On 23 April 2018, it was announced that the second season would premiere in the United States on 11 July 2018.

On April 12, 2019, it was announced that the third series was set to premiere in the United States on July 10, 2019.

=== Casting ===
Alongside the initial series order announcement, it was confirmed that the series would star Samantha Morton, Lesley Manville, and Jessica Brown Findlay. On 7 July 2016, it was announced that Eloise Smyth had been cast in a series regular role.

On 16 October 2017, it was announced that Liv Tyler was joining the main cast in series two.

=== Filming ===
Principal photography for series one was expected to commence in June 2016 in London. The majority of filming took place at Langleybury Mansion, Kings Langley, Hertfordshire. Chiswick House was used to replicate 18th-century London for the series, and additional scenes filmed at Historic Dockyard Chatham.

== Reception ==
All three seasons have been received positively by critics. On the review aggregator website Rotten Tomatoes, the series holds an approval rating of 94% with an average rating of 7.08/10 based on 48 reviews. The website's critical consensus reads, "Harlots uses its titillating subject matter to draw the viewer into a deeper drama about the intersection of survival, business, and family." Metacritic, which uses a weighted average, assigned the season a score of 74 out of 100 based on 17 reviews, indicating "generally favourable reviews".

The second series holds an approval rating of 100% on Rotten Tomatoes based on 11 reviews, with an average rating of 7.83/10. The site's critics' consensus reads: "Harlots maintains its lavish grit and holds an 18th-century mirror up to our contemporary world of troubling gender-based suffering."

The third series holds an approval rating of 100% on Rotten Tomatoes based on 10 reviews, with an average rating of 7.31/10. The site's critics' consensus reads: "Delightfully uncomfortable, Harlots continues to push boundaries, but never at the expense of its deliciously campy fun." Metacritic reports a score of 77 out of 100 based on 4 critics, indicating "generally favourable reviews".
