= The Frankenstein Chronicles =

2015 British TV series

- Genre: Period crime
- Created by: Benjamin Ross; Barry Langford
- Starring: Sean Bean; Tom Ward; Richie Campbell; Vanessa Kirby; Ed Stoppard; Ryan Sampson; Robbie Gee; Anna Maxwell Martin; Charlie Creed-Miles; Eloise Smyth; Samuel West; Mark Bazeley; Elliot Cowan
- Theme music composer: Harry Escott; Roger Goula Sarda
- Country of origin: United Kingdom
- Original language: English
- No. of series: 2
- No. of episodes: 12

Production
- Executive producers: Tracey Scoffield; David Tanner
- Producers: Carol Moorhead; Lawrence Till
- Cinematography: Ian Moss
- Editor: Jesse Parker
- Running time: 60 minutes (w/advertisements)
- Production company: Rainmark Films

Original release
- Network: ITV Encore
- Release: 11 November 2015 – 6 December 2017

The Frankenstein Chronicles is a British television period crime drama series that first aired on ITV Encore on 11 November 2015, designed as a re-imagining of Mary Shelley's 1818 novel Frankenstein; or, The Modern Prometheus. Lead actor Sean Bean also acted as an associate producer on the first series. It follows Inspector John Marlott (Bean), a river police officer who uncovers a corpse made up of body parts from eight missing children and sets about to determine who is responsible.

The series co-stars Richie Campbell as Joseph Nightingale, Robbie Gee as Billy Oates, Tom Ward as Home Secretary Sir Robert Peel, Ed Stoppard as Lord Daniel Hervey, Vanessa Kirby as Lady Jemima (Lord Hervey's sister), and Anna Maxwell Martin as author Mary Shelley. Other historical characters portrayed include William Blake (first series), Ada Lovelace (second series) and Charles Dickens under his pseudonym of ‘Boz’. The first series consists of six episodes which opened to critical acclaim and drew an average 250,000 viewers per episode.

A&E subsequently acquired the series for broadcast in the United States, describing it as "thrilling and terrifying". On 20 June 2016, ITV announced that it had renewed it for a second six-part series, with production set for January 2017. Filming commenced in March 2017, with Laurence Fox and Maeve Dermody joining the cast. The writing team for the second series consisted of Michael Robert Johnson, Paul Tomalin, Noel Farragher, Colin Carberry, and Glenn Patterson, with all six episodes directed by Alex Gabassi. In December 2017, it was announced that Netflix had struck a deal to carry the programme in the United States and other territories. The series was removed from Netflix in February 2022.

== Cast ==
- Sean Bean – Inspector John Marlott, a Thames River Police officer, who has early secondary stage syphilis.
- Tom Ward – Sir Robert Peel, the Home Secretary
- Richie Campbell – Joseph Nightingale, a Bow Street Runner
- Ed Stoppard – Lord Daniel Hervey, an impoverished nobleman and proprietor of a private charity hospital
- Vanessa Kirby – Lady Jemima Hervey, an impoverished noblewoman, sister to Lord Hervey
- Ryan Sampson – Boz, a journalist from The Morning Chronicle
- Robbie Gee – Billy Oates, a hardened street-smart criminal
- Anna Maxwell Martin – Mary Shelley, author of Frankenstein (series 1)
- Richard Clements – Percy Bysshe Shelley, poet and husband of Mary Shelley (series 1)
- Charlie Creed-Miles – Tom Pritty, a grave-robber working for the local surgeons (series 1)
- Eloise Smyth – Flora, a homeless child taken by Billy Oates to work as a prostitute (series 1)
- Samuel West – Sir William Chester, a renowned surgeon and pioneer of galvanism (series 1)
- Mark Bazeley – Garnet Chester, Sir William's cousin, also a surgeon (series 1)
- Elliot Cowan – Sir Bentley Warburton, Sir Robert Peel's political rival (series 1)
- Kate Dickie – Mrs. Bishop, the matron of a gang of murderers (series 1)
- Steven Berkoff – William Blake, author, artist and printmaker (series 1)
- Deirdre Mullins – Agnes Marlott, John Marlott's deceased wife (series 1)
- Laurence Fox – Frederick Dipple, a socialite with an interest in automata (series 2)
- Maeve Dermody – Esther Rose, a Jewish seamstress contracted by Mr. Dipple to provide clothing for his mechanical creations (series 2)
- Victoria Emslie – Automaton, one of Mr. Dipple's mechanical creations (series 2)
- Lily Lesser – Ada Byron, a brilliant female mathematician, assisting Mr. Dipple in creating his automata (series 2)
- Kerrie Hayes – Queenie Pickett, Dipple's housemaid and Nightingale's childhood friend (series 2)
- Aaron Kelly-Sam – A ghost of a dead child (series 2)

== Production ==
The Frankenstein Chronicles was filmed in Northern Ireland in 2015.

== Episodes ==
=== Series 1 (2015) ===
No. overall	No. in series	Title	Directed by	Written by	Original release date	Viewers (millions)
1	1	"A World Without God"	Benjamin Ross	Benjamin Ross & Barry Langford	11 November 2015	0.358
During an operation to catch a gang of opium smugglers, detective John Marlott (Sean Bean) uncovers a body on the bank of the river Thames. Upon examination, the corpse is revealed to be an amalgamation of body parts from up to eight children. Home Secretary Robert Peel (Tom Ward) orders Marlott to quietly investigate the matter. Marlott enlists the help of a vagrant boy who claims to have been told of a "monster" snatching children from the Smithfield market area in the dead of night. Marlott suspects that some of the body parts may belong to local butcher's daughter Alice Evans, who mysteriously disappeared just over a week ago. With the help of Constable Nightingale (Richie Campbell), Marlott identifies a public house where he suspects that some of the children may have been held.
2	2	"Seeing Things"	Benjamin Ross	Benjamin Ross & Barry Langford	18 November 2015	0.278
After his discovery on the banks of the Thames, Inspector Marlott visits the house of artist and printmaker William Blake, who is on his deathbed.
3	3	"All the Lost Children"	Benjamin Ross	Benjamin Ross & Barry Langford	25 November 2015	0.247
Having escaped the clutches of Billy Oates, Flora throws herself on Marlott's mercy. As the investigation continues, Marlott travels to Kentish Town to interrogate Mary Shelley.
4	4	"The Fortunes of War"	Benjamin Ross	Benjamin Ross & Mike Walden	2 December 2015	0.269
Marlott and Pritty seek the help of a local vagrant as they attempt to identify the murderous gang working in the tunnels beneath Smithfield market.
5	5	"The Frankenstein Murders"	Benjamin Ross	Benjamin Ross & Stacey Gregg	9 December 2015	0.215
Boz publishes his newspaper article, The Frankenstein Murders, which causes a public outcry and infuriates Peel on the eve of the Anatomy Act.
6	6	"Lost and Found"	Benjamin Ross	Benjamin Ross & Barry Langford	16 December 2015	0.213
Convinced of Daniel Hervey's guilt, Marlott sets about searching the grounds of the hospital, where he finds Alice, who has been held captive by Hervey's faithful servant, Lloris (Brian Milligan). Although Alice manages to escape, Marlott is captured by Hervey, and when he awakens some hours later, he finds himself covered in blood, with Flora's lifeless body lying on his kitchen table. Despite protesting his innocence, Marlott learns that he is to be sent to the gallows, only to be brought back to life by Hervey through his experimental methods.

=== Series 2 (2017) ===
No. overall	No. in series	Title	Directed by	Written by	Original release date	Viewers (millions)
7	1	"Prodigal Son"	Alex Gabassi	Michael Robert Johnson	1 November 2017	N/A
John Marlott escapes from Bethlem Hospital looking to seek revenge on Lord Daniel Hervey. This does not go to plan.
8	2	"Not John Marlott"	Alex Gabassi	Paul Tomalin	8 November 2017	N/A
Marlott attempts to evade surveillance by getting a position in local seamstress Esther's shop by using a pseudonym. He is convinced that someone is lying about the recent murders of local clergymen and sets to uncover the truth in his search for justice.
9	3	"Seeing the Dead"	Alex Gabassi	Noel Farragher and Paul Tomalin	15 November 2017	N/A
A local fever is sweeping the neighbourhood. Marlott believes that Lord Daniel Hervey is the root of this and that Billy Oates will lead him to the source of the problem.
10	4	"Little Boy Lost"	Alex Gabassi	Colin Carberry, Glenn Patterson and Michael Robert Johnson	22 November 2017	N/A
After meeting the eccentric Frederick Dipple at a party to reveal his new Automaton creation, Marlott realises that his allies may be in greater danger than he originally thought.
11	5	"The Marriage of Heaven and Hell"	Alex Gabassi	Paul Tomalin	29 November 2017	N/A
Armed with new information, Marlott is led to a suspiciously deserted tower. Is he ready for the darkness he encounters within?
12	6	"Bride of Frankenstein"	Alex Gabassi	Michael Robert Johnson	6 December 2017	N/A
With the police closing in, Marlott needs to pull out all the stops to help Esther escape from Dipple and Hervey, and in doing so, turn his fortunes around.

== Reception ==
On Rotten Tomatoes season 1 has an approval rating of 80% based on reviews from 10 critics.

Euan Ferguson at The Guardian concluded "It's genuinely rather good, and a beast of wholly different hide to Jekyll". Carl Wilson at The Globe and Mail wrote: "On balance, the season ended just as brilliantly grim as it started." Ben Travers at IndieWire said: "While it's unlikely to be remembered for as long as it took to make, The Frankenstein Chronicles certainly earned its shot at a long life on Netflix."
