= Eloise Smyth =

English actress

- Born: Eloise Valentine Smyth; 3 March 1995 (age 31); Islington, London, England
- Occupation: Actress
- Years active: 2012–present
- Parent(s): Cathal Joseph Smyth and Joanna Brown

Eloise Smyth (born March 1995) is a British actress best known for her role of Flora in the television series The Frankenstein Chronicles and as Lucy Wells in the television drama series Harlots.

== Early life ==
Eloise Valentine Smyth, currently living in London, is the youngest daughter of Cathal Joseph Smyth (AKA Chas Smash), of the ska band Madness, and Joanna Brown.

== Career ==
Smyth began her acting career in 2012, in British crime drama film Ill Manors alongside Riz Ahmed, Ed Skrein and Jo Hartley. In 2013, Smyth was lead actress when playing the role of Jess in the Jane Linfoot directed short film Sea View for Sigma Films/BFI, which was nominated for BAFTA Award for Best Short Film in 2013. The same film won the Best British Short Film Award at the Leeds International Film Festival, 2013. In 2015, Smyth landed a recurring role as Flora on the television series The Frankenstein Chronicles appearing alongside Sean Bean.

In 2016, Smyth secured a main role as Lucy Wells in 24 episodes of Harlots, a series about a brothel in 18th-century London. In 2017, Smyth played Yeva Podnikov for nine episodes of Sky Atlantic television series Fortitude.

In 2021, Smyth played a main role of Akae in the sci-fi film I Am Mortal (formerly titled The Code). The same year, Smyth starred alongside Jonathan Rhys Meyers in the Stephan Rick directed The Good Neighbor, a film in which her character Vanessa forms a romantic bond with her sister's killer.

== Filmography ==
=== Film ===
Year	Title	Role	Notes
2012	iLL Manors	Jody	
2012	Love Bite	Tiffany	
2013	Sea View	Jess	Short film
2017	How to Talk to Girls at Parties	Savage Sue	
2020	Ending	Alice	Short film
2021	Cyn	Cyn	Short film
2022	The Good Neighbor	Vanessa	
2022	I Am Mortal	Akae	
2023	Grey Matter	Chloe	Post-production

=== Television ===
Year	Title	Role	Notes
2012	Hunted	Teenage Girl	Episode - Snow Maiden
2013	Life of Crime	Amy Reid	Episode #1.1
2017	Fortitude	Yeva Podnikov	9 episodes
2015–2017	The Frankenstein Chronicles	Flora	9 episodes
2017–2019	Harlots	Lucy Wells	24 episodes

== Nominations and awards ==
Smyth was lead actress in Sea View, which was nominated for Best Short Film at the 67th British Academy Film Awards in 2014.
