= Yelena Panova =

Yelena Panova or Elena Panova (Russian: Елена Панова) may refer to:

- Yelena Panova (bodybuilder) (born 1979), Russian bodybuilder
- Yelena Panova (actress) (born 1977), Russian actress
- Yelena Panova (discus thrower) (born 1987), Russian discus thrower
