= Alain Grée =

French illustrator and author (1936–2025)

- Born: 21 July 1936; Eaubonne, France
- Died: 28 February 2025 (aged 88); Gassin, France
- Occupations: Author, illustrator, journalist, graphic designer
- Agent: Noriko Oseko – RicoBel
- Website: alaingree.com

Alain Grée (French pronunciation: [alɛ̃ gre]; 21 July 1936 – 28 February 2025) was a French illustrator and author.

== Education ==
Grée studied in Paris at the École des Arts appliqués (atelier d'Art Graphique) and at the Beaux-Arts de Paris.

== Career ==
Grée wrote three detective novels ("La Chouette" editions) and produced children's broadcasts on the French national television for two years.

As an author and illustrator of children's books, Alain Grée published over 300 works for several publishers, including Casterman and Hachette, most of them in the 1960s and 1970s. His books were translated into 25 different languages. In that same period, Alain Grée also invented illustrated artwork for 12 educational board games for children, issued by Nathan.

Grée also worked as an illustrator for Pomme d'Api and Journal de Babar magazines. He later created 10 books as initiation works to ship navigation for Gallimard editions.

He worked as a journalist for the Voiles et Voiliers sailing ships magazine for 20 years, and was working as a graphic designer and editor of advertising publications at the time of his death.

== Personal life and death ==
Grée married Monique in 1960 at Balbigny, and they had two children.

His main hobby and passion was sailing, and he owned several sailboats. In the 1970s, he sailed across the Atlantic Ocean twice.

Grée died in Gassin, France on 28 February 2025, at the age of 88.

== Major books ==
Hachette

- Il y a ... series (1966–1967)
- J'apprends ... series (1968–1975)
- Qu'est-ce qui ... series (1966–1976)
- les racontes series (1969–1971)
- je serai series (1972–1973)

Casterman

- Achille et Bergamote series (1962–1983)
- CADET-RAMA series (1962–1983)
- ROMEO series (1966–1968)

Other publishers

- FERNAND NATHAN EDITIONS (1959–1962)
- FLEURUS EDITIONS (1963–1964)
- GAUTIER-LANGUEREAU EDITIONS (1963–1964)
- FARANDOLE EDITIONS (1963)
- ARMAND COLIN EDITIONS (1966–1967)

=== Select Bibliography of Other Works ===
- Keith and Sally Out and About (Evans Brothers Limited, London, 1966) - author and illustrator Alain Gree; adapted by Annemarie Ryba
- Keith and Sally at the Seaside
- Keith and Sally in the Woods
- Keith and Sally go Abroad
- Keith and Sally on the Farm
- Keith and Sally Look at Ships
