= Stephan Rick =

Stephan Rick (born 1974) is a German screenwriter and filmmaker best known for his 2011 German-language film The Good Neighbour, which he directed and wrote, and remade in 2022 in English as The Good Neighbor, starring Jonathan Rhys Meyers and Luke Kleintank.

Rick has also directed 2015's The Dark Side of the Moon and 2017's The Super, starring Patrick Flueger and Val Kilmer. In 2021 Rick directed the German-language film The Last Harvest.
