= Luke Kleintank =

American actor (born 1990)

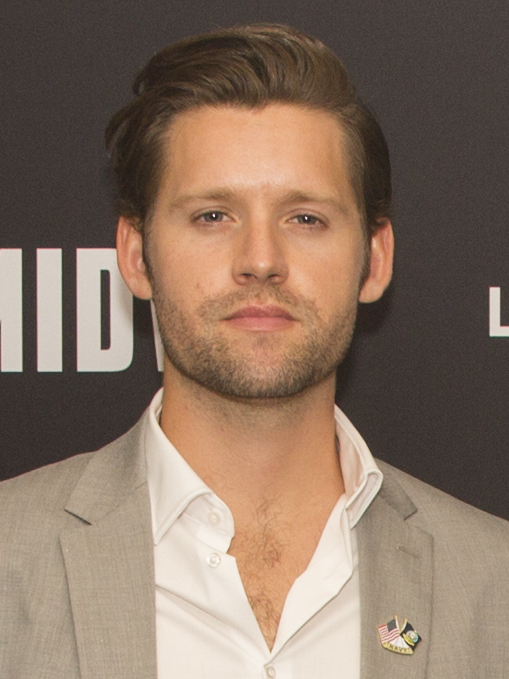
- Kleintank in 2019
- Born: May 18, 1990 (age 36); Cincinnati, Ohio, U.S.
- Occupation: Actor
- Years active: 2009–present
- Children: 1

Luke Kleintank (born May 18, 1990) is an American actor. He is known for playing Finn Abernathy on Bones, Tyler Harne in the 2015 film Max, and Joe Blake in the Amazon series The Man in the High Castle. From 2021 to 2024, he played FBI Special Agent Scott Forrester in the CBS crime drama series FBI: International.

== Early life ==
Kleintank was born on May 18, 1990, in Cincinnati, Ohio. He has five older siblings. He and his family moved to Guadalajara, Mexico, when he was two, where he resided for three years, learning to speak English and Spanish. He spent the rest of his formative years in Queen Anne's County, Maryland, where he resided for 12 years. On his paternal grandfather's side, Kleintank is of Dutch and German descent. His second great-grandfather, Antonius Klein Tank (later changed to Kleintank), was born in 1827 in the municipality of Lichtenvoorde, Netherlands, moved to Cincinnati in 1846, and married Catharina Adelheides Messink from Nordhorn in 1854.

== Career ==
Kleintank's mother introduced him to acting when he was 5. "She threw me into my first play, Carnival. Made a part for me", he recounts. "That's when I knew I wanted to act." He started doing plays and community theater, and took part in a number of stage productions while in high school.

Kleintank went to New York City to pursue his acting career, and made his television debut as Greg in a 2009 episode of Law & Order: Special Victims Unit. In 2010, he played a recurring role on Gossip Girl as Elliot Leichter, a bisexual love interest for Eric van der Woodsen. After relocating to Los Angeles, Kleintank landed his first daytime role, debuting as Noah Newman in The Young and the Restless on September 21, 2010. He left the role after less than six months to play Chris on No Ordinary Family.

In 2011, Kleintank joined the cast of the Fox series Bones as Finn Abernathy. In 2013, he had a small recurring role in the CBS series Person of Interest as Caleb Phipps, first appearing for one episode in the middle of season 2 and then again as a crucial character for two more episodes in 2015 that was critical to the storyline development towards the season 4 finale. From 2013 to 2014, he portrayed the recurring character of Travis in the ABC Family teen drama series Pretty Little Liars. He played Tyler Harne in the 2015 film Max. From 2015 to 2018, Kleintank played Nazi agent Joe Blake in the Amazon series The Man in the High Castle.

In 2019, Kleintank played Nick Holland in Crown Vic, Platt Barbour in The Goldfinch, and Clarence Dickinson in Midway.

From 2021 to 2024, Kleintank played FBI Special Agent Scott Forrester in CBS crime drama series FBI: International. In April 2024, he announced that he would be leaving the series in order to spend more time with his family. His last episode is "Touts" in Season 3 (2024).

== Personal life ==
In December 2018, Kleintank became engaged to Christina Vignaud, daughter of Argentine diplomat Juan Carlos Vignaud.

== Filmography ==
Key
†	Denotes projects that have not yet been released

=== Film ===
Year	Title	Role	Notes	Ref.
2014	Dark House	Nick Di Santo		
2014	1000 to 1: The Cory Weissman Story	Brendan "Pops" Trelease	Direct-to-video	
2014	Phantom Halo	Beckett Emerson		
2014	Sacrifice	Hank Youngblood		
2015	Max	Tyler Harne		
2019	Crown Vic	Nick Holland		
2019	The Goldfinch	Platt Barbour		
2019	Midway	Clarence Dickinson		
2022	The Good Neighbor	David		

=== Television ===
Year	Title	Role	Notes	Ref.
2009	Law & Order: Special Victims Unit	Greg	Episode: "Snatched"	
2009	Mercy	Josh	Episode: "I'm Not That Kind of Girl"	
2010	Parenthood	Howard	Recurring role; 2 episodes	
2010–2011	The Young and the Restless	Noah Newman	Recurring role; 17 episodes	
2010–2011	Gossip Girl	Elliot Leichter	Recurring role; 6 episodes	
2011	Greek	Rylan	Episode: "Agents for Change"	
2011	No Ordinary Family	Chris Minor	Recurring role; 8 episodes	
2011	Law & Order: LA	Jesse Beckman	Episode: "Runyon Canyon"	
2011	CSI: Miami	Tom Granger	Episode: "Long Gone"	
2011–2014	Bones	Finn Abernathy	Recurring role; 8 episodes	
2012	The Good Wife	Connor	Episode: "Here Comes the Judge"	
2013	CSI: Crime Scene Investigation	Jake	Recurring role; 2 episodes	
2013–2014	Pretty Little Liars	Travis Hobbs	Recurring role; 9 episodes	
2013–2015	Person of Interest	Caleb Phipps	Recurring role; 3 episodes	
2015–2018	The Man in the High Castle	Joe Blake	Series regular; 26 episodes	
2021–2024	FBI: International	FBI SSA Scott Forrester	Series regular; 54 episodes	
2023	FBI	FBI SSA Scott Forrester	Episode: "Imminent Threat - Part Two"	
2023	FBI: Most Wanted	FBI SSA Scott Forrester	Episode: "Imminent Threat - Part Three"	
TBA	The Interrogator †	Voss	Pre-production	
