= Diogenes Verlag =

Swiss publisher

- Founded: 1952
- Founder: Daniel Keel
- Country of origin: Switzerland
- Headquarters location: Zurich
- Publication types: literature; plays; drawing; cartoon
- Official website: www.diogenes.ch

The Diogenes Verlag (short: Diogenes) is a Swiss publisher in Zurich, founded in 1952 by Daniel Keel, with a focus on literature, plays and cartoons. It has been managed since 2012 by the founder's son, Philipp Keel. It is the largest independent literary publisher in Europe.

== History ==
Daniel Keel, who founded the publishing house in 1952, chose the name of the philosopher Diogenes, arguing "I found Diogenes especially appealing because he battled against every sort of convention not just theoretically but also in his lifestyle. And what really pleases me: he left no written record whatsoever, and yet his spirit lives on." The first book published by Diogenes was Ronald Searle's Hurrah for St. Trinian's!. In 1960 Keel moved the business to an office. Two years later, he had 12 employees. The first British author was Muriel Spark, and the first Americans were Carson McCullers, Harold Brodkey and Patricia Highsmith, all virtually unknown in German-speaking countries.

Rudolf Bettschart, Keel's childhood friend, became a business partner responsible for finances and marketing in 1966. In 2002, after 50 years, the company had 60 employees and was Europe's largest publisher of fiction, having published more than 3,400 books by 700 authors in more than 150 million copies. 1,744 titles were in print then, by 350 authors, including "bestselling" Paulo Coelho, John Irving, Ian McEwan and Barbara Vine. Bernhard Schlink's The Reader was the first German novel to reach the top of the New York Times bestseller list. The founder, asked for his secret of success, said: "Every kind of writing is permitted – except for the boring kind", and "I divide all works into two categories: those that I like and those that I don't like. I have no other criterion", continuing: "And since I'm a poor slob of a publisher who – as the critics rightly suspect – is himself unable to read or write a decent sentence, I borrowed these two phrases from two of our authors, namely Voltaire and Anton Chekhov." In 2003, Coelho's bestseller The Alchemist appeared on the book fair translated to 52 languages, setting a world record.

Daniel Keel died on 13 September 2011. His son Philippe succeeded him in April 2012.

== Program ==
The publisher's focus is literature, contemporary authors in several languages as well as classics of world literature. Other fields are art, cartoons, children's literature, detective stories and audio books. Tomi Ungerer created coloured illustration for Das große Liederbuch, a collection of songs. Titles have included religious texts such as Die Bergpredigt. Aktuelle Texte aus dem Neuen Testament, poetry (Die schönsten Gedichte von Bertolt Brecht), philosophy such as Albert Camus' Weder Opfer noch Henker. Über eine neue Weltordnung, letters such as Georges Simenon's Brief an meine Mutter and Albert Einstein/Sigmund Freud's Warum Krieg?, and Eastern wisdom including Worte großer Meister and Krishnamurti's Meditation.

== Authors ==
Authors published by Diogenes include: Joan Aiken, Margery Allingham, Eric Ambler, Alfred Andersch, Jakob Arjouni, Stefan Bachmann, Honoré de Balzac, Ray Bradbury, Rainer Brambach, Gwendoline Butler, Anton Chekhov, Raymond Chandler, Paulo Coelho, Andrea De Carlo, Charles De Coster, Luciano De Crescenzo, Charles Dickens, Philippe Djian, Rolf Dobelli, Doris Dörrie, Jessica Durlacher, Friedrich Dürrenmatt, William Faulkner, Federico Fellini, Anne Fine, F. Scott Fitzgerald, Gustave Flaubert, Dick Francis, Celia Fremlin, Friedrich Glauser, Nikolai Gogol, René Goscinny, Jeremias Gotthelf, Arnon Grünberg, Robert van Gulik, Erich Hackl, Dashiell Hammett, Otto Jägersberg, Janosch, Gottfried Keller, Hans Werner Kettenbach, Andrey Kurkov, Hartmut Lange, D. H. Lawrence, Donna Leon, Hugo Loetscher, Loriot, Ross Macdonald, Ludwig Marcuse, W. Somerset Maugham, Margaret Millar, Molière, Brian Moore, Sibylle Mulot, Magdalen Nabb, Friedrich Nietzsche, Walter Nigg, Ingrid Noll, Amélie Nothomb, Seán Ó Faoláin, George Orwell, Liaty Pisani, Christoph Poschenrieder, Laurens van der Post, Joachim Ringelnatz, Saki, Bernhard Schlink, Arthur Schopenhauer, Meir Shalev, Alan Sillitoe, Georges Simenon, Aleksandr Zinovyev, Henry Slesar, Jason Starr, Robert Louis Stevenson, Thomas Strittmatter, Patrick Süskind, Martin Suter, Andrzej Szczypiorski, Susanna Tamaro, Jim Thompson, Leo Tolstoy, B. Traven, Mark Twain, Fred Uhlman, Tomi Ungerer, Jules Verne, Walter Vogt, Robert Walser, Valerie Wilson Wesley, Urs Widmer, Oscar Wilde, Leon de Winter, Cornell Woolrich and Banana Yoshimoto.

== Drawing ==
Internationally known illustrators and cartoonists have been published from the beginning, including Jean Bosc, Chaval, Paul Flora, Edward Gorey, Loriot, Luis Murschetz, Sempé, Roland Topor, F. K. Waechter and Reiner Zimnik. Some of the artists illustrated other books or created drawings of title pages for Diogenes. Children's books included works by Philippe Fix and Maurice Sendak.

== Awards ==
In 2012 Diogenes was awarded the title "Publisher of the Year" of the trade paper Buchmarkt, for the 11th time since 1982.

== Literature ==
- Daniel Kampa, Winfried Stephan (ed.): Diogenes. Eine illustrierte Verlagschronik mit Bibliographie 1952–2002. Diogenes, Zürich 2003, ISBN 3-257-05600-1.
- Daniel Kampa, Armin C. Kälin (ed.): Diogenes-Autoren-Album. Diogenes, Zürich 1996; Neuausgabe ebd. 2002, ISBN 3-257-22900-3.
- Daniel Kampa, Stephan Winfried: Zwei Freunde, ein Verlag. Für Rudolf C. Bettschart und Daniel Keel zum 80. Geburtstag am 10. Oktober 2010, Diogenes, Zürich 2010, ISBN 978-3-257-05618-1.
- 60 Jahre Diogenes. In: Diogenes Magazin, Nr. 11, Herbst 2012, S. 93–107.
