= Cauer =

Cauer is a German surname.

This surname is shared by the following people:

- Emil Cauer the Elder (1800–1867), German sculptor
- Emil Cauer the Younger (1867–1946), German sculptor
- Karl Cauer (1828–1886), German sculptor
- Ludwig Cauer (1866–1947), German sculptor
- Minna Cauer (1841–1922), German educator, journalist and radical activist within the middle-class women's movement
- Robert Cauer the Elder (1831–1893), German sculptor
- Robert Cauer the Younger (1863–1947), German sculptor
- Stanislaus Cauer (1867–1943), German sculptor
- Wilhelm Cauer (1900–1945), German mathematician and scientist

== See also ==
- Kauer
