= Kalckreuth =

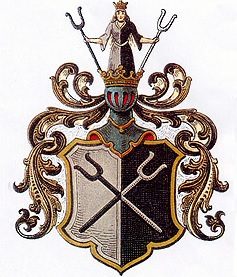
Coat of arms of Kacklreuth family

The House of Kalckreuth is the name of an ancient and important German noble family that originated in Saxony.

== History ==
The family was first mentioned in a document on December 16, 1284 with Heinricus dictus de Kalcruthe on Lyce near Dresden . Conrad von Kalckreuth appears in a document on December 6, 1286. In early 14th century, several lines appeared that spread widely throughout Silesia, but also in Lusatia, Brandenburg, Mecklenburg and Poland.

== Title ==
Family members were awarded with the title of Baron in 1678 . Brothers Hans Ernst (1728-1792) and Friedrich Adolf, Count von Kalckreuth, who were raised to the Prussian count status in 1786, founded the two lines of the comital family.

== Notable members ==
- Friedrich Adolf, Count von Kalckreuth (1737–1818), Prussian field marshal
- Count Stanislaus von Kalckreuth (1820–1894), German landscape painter
- Count Leopold von Kalckreuth (1855–1928), German Impressionist painter
- Countess Maria von Kalckreuth (1857-1897), German painter
- Countess Tamara von Kalckreuth (born 1972), German television personality, wife of Count Alexander von Kalckreuth
- Countess Elfie von Kalckreuth (Eva Anthes), actress
