= Arnold Mendelssohn =

German composer and music teacher

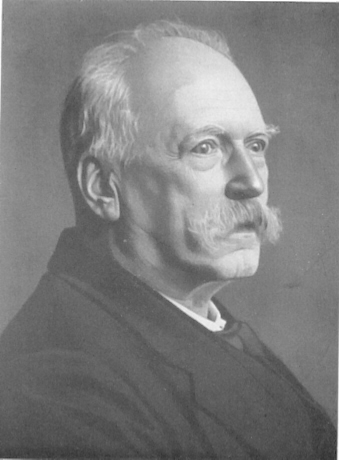
- Born: 26 December 1855
- Died: 18 February 1933 (aged 77)
- Occupations: composer and music educator

Arnold Ludwig Mendelssohn (26 December 1855 – 18 February 1933), was a German composer and music teacher.

== Life ==
He was born in Ratibor, Province of Silesia, the son of Felix Mendelssohn's cousin Wilhelm Mendelssohn who, in 1854, had married Louise Aimee Cauer (sister to Bertha Cauer). In 1885, Arnold Ludwig himself married his second cousin, Maria Cauer, daughter of Karl Cauer (sister of Ludwig Cauer).

Mendelssohn was originally a lawyer before studying music at the Institut für Kirchenmusik in Berlin (1877–80). His teachers there were Karl August Haupt for the organ, Carl Albert Löschhorn for the piano and Eduard Grell, Friedrich Kiel and Wilhelm Taubert for composition. A series of musical appointments followed: music director and organist at Bonn University (1880–82), where he became friendly with the Bach scholar Philipp Spitta; music director in Bielefeld (1882–5); teacher of composition at the Cologne Conservatory (1885–90); and master of church music and professor at the conservatory in Darmstadt (1891–1912). After that he taught at the Frankfurt Conservatory where his students included Paul Hindemith and Kurt Thomas.

He died in Darmstadt. After his death his works were banned in Nazi Germany because of his Jewish heritage.

== Music ==
Mendelssohn was a champion of Lutheran church music, reviving the works of Bach and Schütz, and adopting a polyphonic liturgical idiom in his own compositions. In this he influenced younger composers, such as Hugo Distler, Ernst Pepping and Günter Raphael. The early choral work Abendkantate (1881) shows the strong influence of Bach, but later works, such as his incidental music to Goethe's Paria (1906) and his motet collection Geistliche Chormusik (1926) are more individual. His opera Der Bärenhäuter (1897) avoids Wagner's influence and uses Grimm fairy tales and folk music as its sources. Mendelssohn also wrote chamber music (including three string quartets and two piano sonatas), and orchestral music, including three symphonies and a Violin Concerto, which was premiered in 1920 under Michael Balling with the soloist Otto Drumm.

=== Works ===
Operas and stage music

- Elsi, die seltsame Magd (op. 8), Oper in 2 Aufzügen. Libretto: Hermann Wette; premier 16 April 1896 Stadttheater Köln
- Der Bärenhäuter (op. 11), Oper in 3 Acts. Libretto: Hermann Wette; premiere 9 February 1900 Theater des Westens in Berlin
- Die Minneburg (1904–07), Oper in einem Akt. Libretto: G. von Koch; premiere 1909 in Mannheim
- Paria (incidental music, J.W. von Goethe), op. 36 (Berlin, 1906)
- Pandora (incidental music, Goethe), op. 37 (Berlin, 1908)

Choral

- Abendkantate (Berlin, 1881)
- Das Leiden des Herrn, soloists, chorus, organ and orchestra, op. 13 (1900)
- Aus tiefer Not, soloists, chorus, organ and orchestra, op. 54 (1912)
- Auf meinen lieben Gott, soloists, chorus, organ and orchestra, op. 61 (1912)
- Zagen und Zuversicht, soloists, chorus, organ and orchestra, op. 84 (1920)
- Deutsche Messe, 8vv chorus, op. 89 (1923)
- Geistliche Chormusik, 14 motets for the liturgical year, op. 90 (1926)

Lied

- Four collected volumes and individual opus numbers

Orchestral

- Symphony No. 1 (premiered in Darmstadt, 1920)
- Violin Concerto in G minor, op. 88 (1920)
- Symphony No. 2 in C major, op. 93 (1922)

Wind band

- Suite for Woodwinds, Brass and Percussion, op. 62 (1916)

Chamber music

- String Quartet No. 2 in D major, op. 67 (Leipzig, 1915)
- Sonata for Violoncello and Piano in F-sharp minor, op. 70 (1917)
- Sonata for Violin and Piano in C Major, op. 71 (1917)
- Trio for 2 Violins & Piano in A minor, op. 76 (1918)
- String Quartet No. 3 in B♭, op. 83 (Leipzig, 1926)

Solo piano music

- Moderne Suite for Piano, op. 79 (1918)
- Piano Sonata in C minor, op. 66 (1916)
- Piano Sonata in E minor, op. 66 (1916)

=== Selected recordings ===
- Complete Piano Music, Elżbieta Sternlicht. Hänssler Classic HC17088 (2018)
- Deutsche Messe, op. 89, SWR Vokalensemble Stuttgart, Frieder Bernius. Hänssler Classic SACD 93.293 (2012)
- Geistliche Chormusik, op. 90, Berliner Vokalensemble, Bernd Stegmann. Cantate C 58005 (1999)
- String Quartets Nos. 2 and 3, Reinhold-Quartett, CPO 777 774-2 (2012)
- Symphony No. 2, op. 93; Violin Concerto, op. 88. Symphoniker Hamburg, Ulrich Windfuhr. CPO 555665 2 (2026)
