= Eichrodt =

Eichrodt is a German surname. Notable people with the surname include:

- Hellmut Eichrodt (1872–1943), German painter and graphic artist
- Ike Eichrodt, American baseball player
- Ludwig Eichrodt, German poet
- Walther Eichrodt, German theologian and scholar
