= Kauer =

Kauer is a German surname.

This surname is shared by the following people:

- Erich Kauer (1908–1989), German international footballer
- Ferdinand Kauer (1751–1831), Austrian composer and pianist
- Sophie Kauer (born 2001), British-German cellist and actress
- Wolfgang Kauer (born 1957), Austrian author

== See also ==
- Cauer
