= Tamara Gräfin von Nayhauß =

German television presenter

Tamara von Nayhauß
- Born: 23 July 1972 (age 53); Bonn, North Rhine-Westphalia; West Germany
- Noble family: von Nayhauss (by birth) von Kalckreuth (by marriage)
- Spouse: Count Alexander von Kalckreuth
- Issue: Count Maximilian von Kalckreuth; Count Louis Stanislaus von Kalckreuth
- Father: Count Mainhardt von Nayhauß
- Mother: Sabine Beierlein
- Occupation: television presenter, blogger, socialite

Countess Tamara von Nayhauss (German: Tamara Gräfin von Nayhauß) (born 23 July 1972) is a German television presenter, blogger, and socialite.

== Early life and education ==
Von Nayhauss was born on 23 July 1972 in Bonn to Count Mainhardt von Nayhauß-Cormons (b. 1926) and Sabine Beierlein (b. 1942). She is a member of the House of Nayhauß, an ancient noble family in Germany. She studied at the Pädagogium Otto Kühne School in Bonn until 1993. In 1994 she moved to Paris to study art history and French at the University of Paris.

== Career ==
Von Nayhauss began her television career in 1995 as a trainee at ProSieben. From 1996 until 2002 she worked as a reporter and editor for SAM, a celebrity news show. In 2002 she became a host and presenter on the German television channel RTL. She has worked as a presenter for Life! The Desire to Live, Formel Exclusiv, Germany Seeks A Superstar, and Abenteuer & Reisen. She also had guest roles on the 2004 television series Hinter Gittern - The Women's Prison and the 2006 German television movie Daddy and Mama. Since 2006 she has produced and hosted the show Hallo Deutschland. From 2007 to 2008 she hosted Deluxe - All Fun, a luxury and lifestyle show.

In December 2016, von Nayhauss launched a fashion and lifestyle blog called Comtesse Express.

== Personal life ==
In 2005 she married Count Alexander von Kalckreuth (b. 1972), an attorney, in a Catholic ceremony at the Merseburg Cathedral. They have two children.
