= Wilhelmine Clauss-Szarvady =

Bohemian-born French pianist

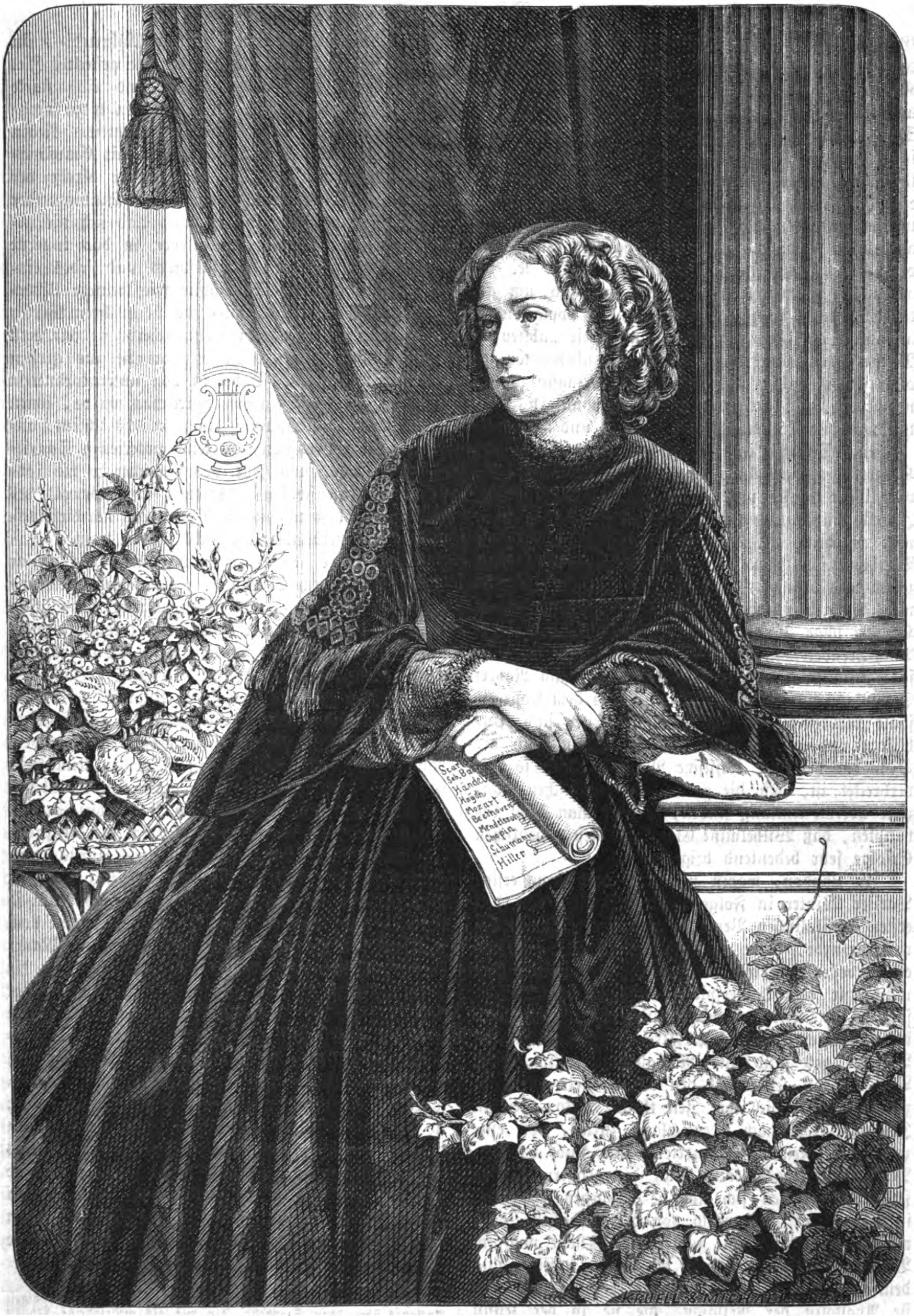
- Portrait by Gustav Kruell (1867)

Background information
- Born: Wilhelmine Clauss; 12 December 1832; Prague, Bohemia
- Died: 1 September 1907 (aged 74) Paris, France
- Genres: classical
- Instrument: piano

Wilhelmine Clauss-Szarvady (12 December 1832 – 1 September 1907) was a Bohemian-born French pianist.

== Biography ==
She was born Wilhelmine Clauss in Prague. She was recognized as a remarkable talent at a young age and studied piano with Josef Proksch in Prague. Clauss-Szarvady took her first concert tour at the age of 16. In 1850, she met Franz Liszt, who encouraged her in her art and dedicated two works to her. She married the Hungarian journalist and diplomat Frigyes Szarvady in 1855 and moved to Paris. After the birth of a son the following year, she performed less often for a time but later continued performing. Clauss-Szarvady taught Auguste Auspitz-Kolar in Paris.

She preferred works by the grand masters such as Bach, Handel, Beethoven, Mozart, Scarlatti and Schubert but also performed works by more contemporary composers such as Liszt, Wagner and Schumann. Joseph Joachim Raff, Samuel de Lange and Robert Radecke dedicated compositions to her. She is credited with introducing German composers to Paris audiences.

Clauss-Szarvady died in Paris at the age of 74.
