= Emil Cauer the Younger =

German sculptor (1867–1946)

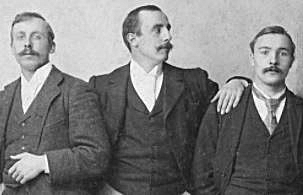
- Emil (center) with his brothers, Ludwig (left) and Hans
- Born: 6 August 1867; Bad Kreuznach
- Died: 13 February 1946; Gersfeld

Emil Cauer the Younger (1867–1946) was a German sculptor, known for his monuments and fountains in Berlin.

== Life and work ==
He was born to the sculptor Karl Cauer and his wife Elisabeth Magdalene née Schmidt. His grandfather, Emil, was the first of a long line of sculptors in the Cauer family. He had four brothers, who all became artists: Robert, Ludwig and Hugo (1864–1918), who were also sculptors, and Hans, who was a painter.

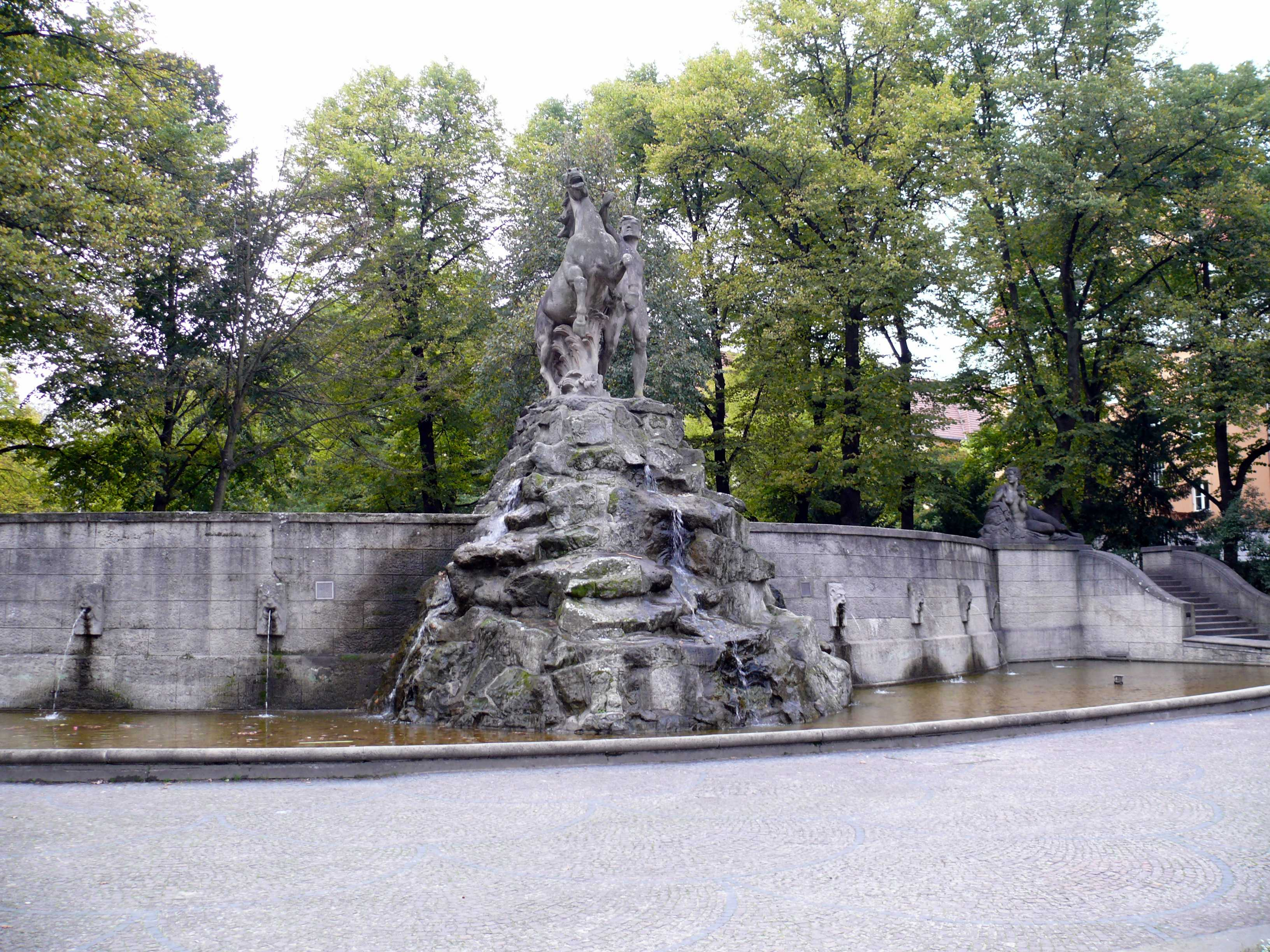
The Siegfried Fountain

His first lessons were in his father's studio, followed by studies in Rome, from 1886 to 1887, at the workshop belonging to his uncle, Robert. In 1888, he went to Berlin, where he completed his studies with Otto Lessing at the Teaching institute of the Kunstgewerbemuseum. After that, he worked as a freelance sculptor, which included several stays in the United States, in St. Louis, where his family had professional connections. From 1893, he divided his time between Berlin and Bad Kreuznach.

In 1898, he finally opened his own studio in Berlin. He mostly produced portrait busts, but also received some commissions for public statues. In 1899, for the city of Hagen, he designed a six-meter (19.6 ft.) bronze monument to Kaiser Friedrich III. Three years later, he designed the seven meter (22.9 ft.) stone and bronze Drei-Kaiser-Brunnen (Three Emperor Fountain), also for Hagen.

Most of his notable works were done for Berlin. This includes two more prominent fountains; the Erika-Brunnen, on the Adam-Kuckhoff-Platz in the Wilmersdorf district (destroyed in 1943), and the Neo-Baroque style Siegfried-Brunnen, a sandstone sculpture on the Rüdesheimer Platz, also in Wilmersdorf. One of his largest works is the Kriegerdenkmal für gefallene Feldeisenbahner (War Memorial to Fallen Field Railwaymen), on the Invalidenstraße in the courtyard of the former Royal Museum of Transport and Construction at the Hamburger Bahnhof (now the Museum für Gegenwart).

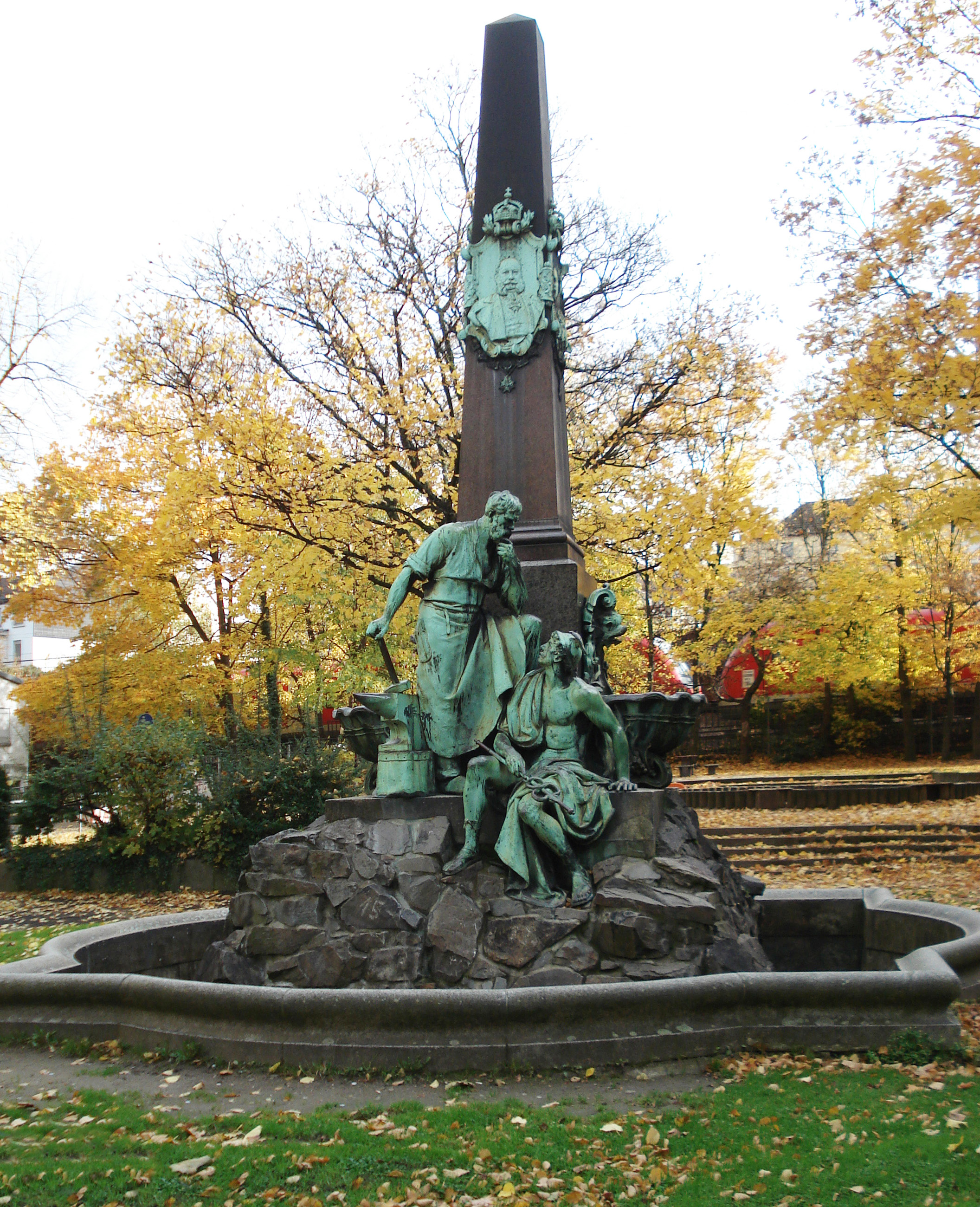
The Three Emperor Fountain

In 1906, he moved to Darmstadt to join his brother, Robert. There, he specialized in reliefs, many with religious subjects, for public and private clients, although he continued to produce busts. He was named a Professor by Grand Duke Ernst Ludwig in 1916.
