= Stanislaus von Kalckreuth =

German painter (1820–1894)

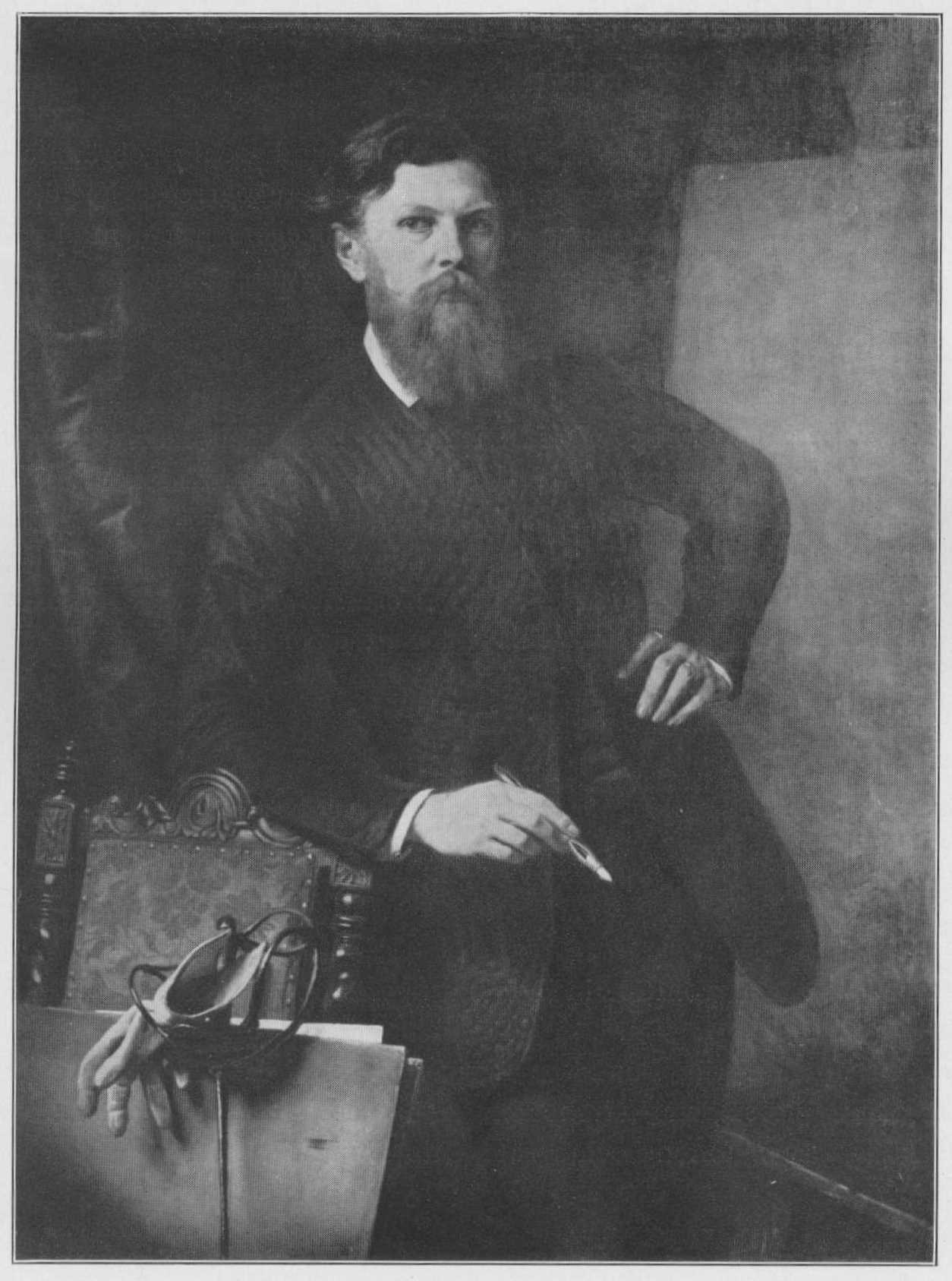
Stanislaus Graf von Kalckreuth; portrait by Karl Ferdinand Sohn (1858)

Count Stanislaus Friedrich Ludwig von Kalckreuth (25 December 1820 – 25 November 1894) was a German painter who specialized in mountain landscapes.

== Biography ==
He was born in Kozmin into the Kalckreuth family of the Prussian nobility with roots in the early 13th century. After completing his primary education at the gymnasium in Leszno (then Polnisch Lissa), he was briefly a member of a cadet corps. At the age of twenty, he went to Potsdam and became an officer in the 1st Foot Guards, but served for only a short time, having decided on a career in art. From 1840 to 1844, he studied with Gustav Wegener, then went to Berlin, where he studied with Wilhelm Krause and Karl Eduard Biermann.

In 1849 he married Anna Eleonore Cauer (1829-1881), daughter of the sculptor Emil Cauer the Elder. That same year, he moved again, this time to Düsseldorf, enrolling at the Kunstakademie and studying with Johann Wilhelm Schirmer from 1846 to 1849. Upon completing the program there, he settled in Cologne for two years, then returned to Düsseldorf for more lessons with Schirmer until 1853. During these years, he also took study trips to Switzerland, the Pyrenees, France and Italy; financed by a government stipend.

At the end of his copious studies, King Friedrich Wilhelm IV named him a Professor. In 1858, he went to Weimar and was instrumental in creating the Grand-Ducal Saxon Art School; becoming its first director in 1860 at a grand opening ceremony attended by the King. He quickly devoted himself to establishing a faculty composed of progressive artists.

In 1876, he retired and moved to Bad Kreuznach, his wife Anna's hometown. In 1883, two years after her death, he moved to Munich, where he died. His son, Leopold, and daughter, Maria also became well-known painters. Dietrich Bonhoeffer was his great-grandson.

== Sources ==
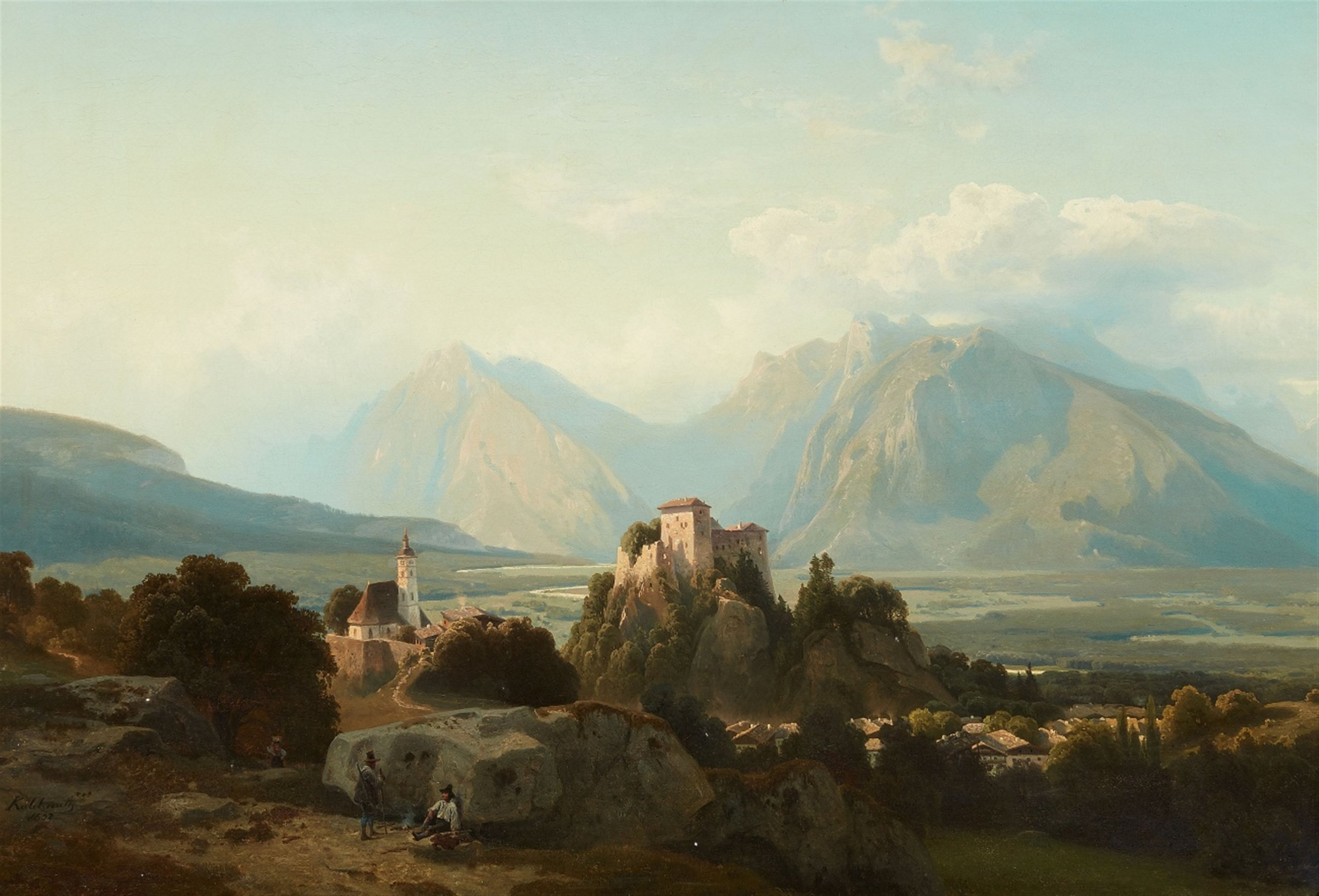
Mountain Landscape with Castle

- Friedrich von Boetticher, "Kalckreuth, Stanislaus, Graf von", In: Malerwerke des Neunzehnten Jahrhunderts: Beitrag zur Kunstgeschichte Vol.1, Boetticher's Verlag, 1891 pgs.685-686 Online
- Friedrich Haack (1910). "Kalckreuth, Stanislaus Graf von" . Allgemeine Deutsche Biographie (in German). Vol. 55. Leipzig: Duncker & Humblot. pp. 813–814.
- Ralf Weingart, in Hans Paffrath (Ed.): Lexikon der Düsseldorfer Malerschule 1819–1918. Vol.2: Haach–Murtfeldt., Kunstmuseum Düsseldorf and the Galerie Paffrath. Bruckmann, Munich 1998, ISBN 3-7654-3010-2
