= Richard Brend'amour =

German wood-engraver, printer and publisher

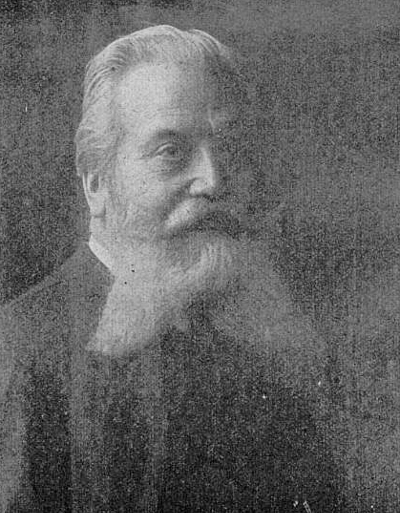
Richard Brend'amour (1911), by Otto Renard (1855-1943)

Franz Robert Richard Brend’amour (16 October 1831, Aachen – 22 January 1915, Düsseldorf) was a German wood-engraver, printer and publisher.

== Biography ==
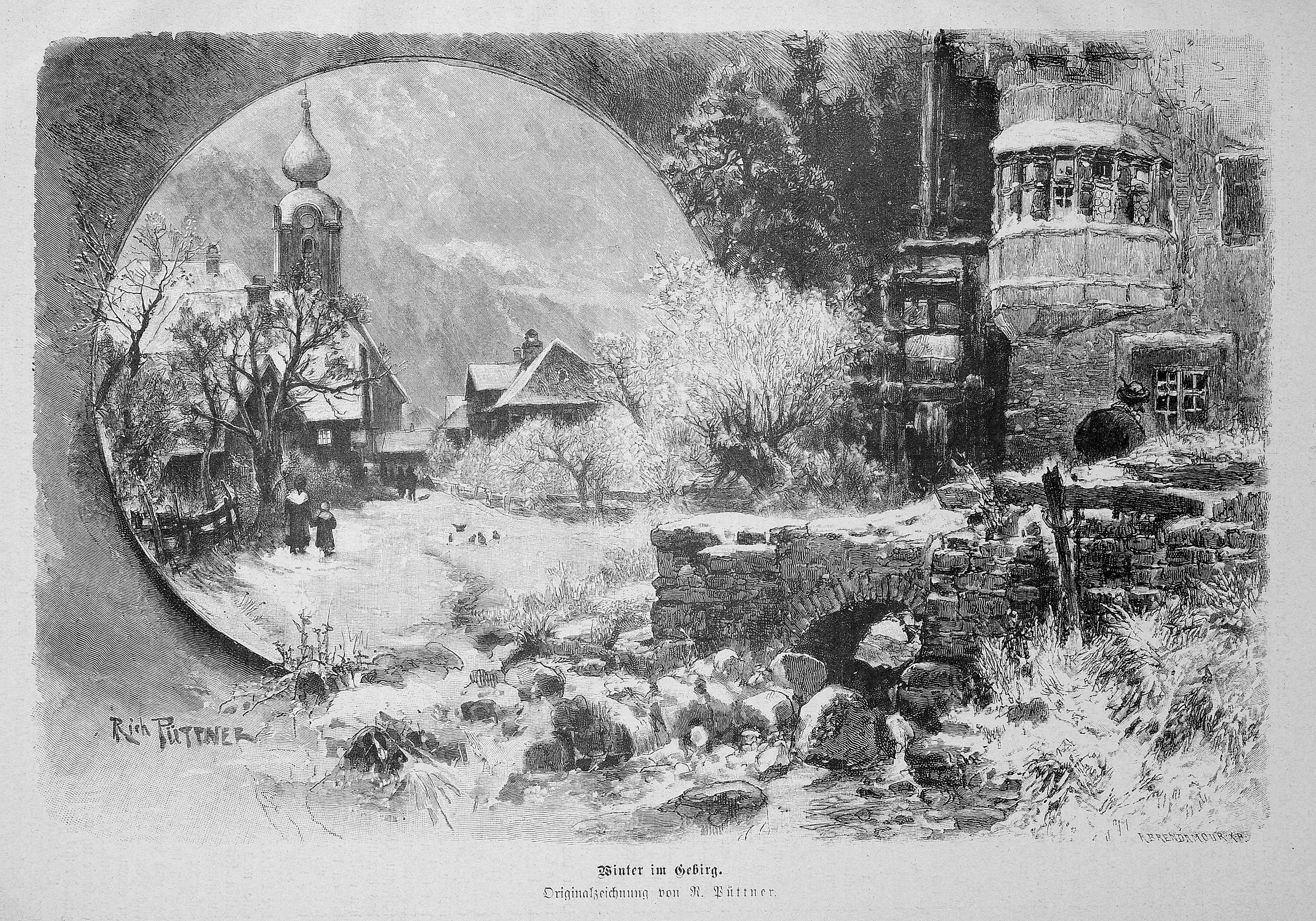
"Winter in the Mountains", from Die Gartenlaube

He came from a Huguenot family; the first son of Johann Nikolaus Brend’amour, a police inspector, and his wife, Maria Sophia née Leruth. From 1846 to 1849 he was apprenticed to a wood-engraver named Eustach Stephan, in Cologne. When Stephan moved to Paris in 1850, he continued his training with Johann Anton Ramboux, a lithographer. He also translated classic woodcuts from the Renaissance.

In 1856, he went to Düsseldorf, where he established the Xylographische Kunstanstalt Brend’amour & Cie, an "art institute", with several assistants. His business grew steadily so, in 1866, he brought in his brother-in-law, Rudolf Goldenberg, to handle its financial management. His illustrations for literary works brought him widespread recognition outside of Germany. He also provided them for magazines and newspapers, including the Illustrirte Zeitung, Über Land und Meer, and Die Gartenlaube. Presumably, not all of them were by Brend'amour himself; there were far too many. In 1872, at the International Polytechnic Exhibition in Moscow, the gold medal was officially awarded to his company, not Brend'amour personally.

During the 1870s, he added branches in Berlin, Leipzig, Braunschweig, Stuttgart and Munich. He had business relations with companies in England, France and Spain. Gustav Kruell, who would later become a well known engraver in the United States, was an apprentice at the company's original branch in the early part of the decade.

In 1898 his nephew, Fritz Goldenberg, and Heinrich Simhart established the graphic arts firm, Brend’amour, Simhart & Co, in Munich. From 1859 until his death, he was a member of the progressive artists' association, Malkasten, and the Verein der Düsseldorfer Künstler. In 1904, he was awarded the Prussian Order of the Crown. Five years later, he retired and received the Order of the Red Eagle.

His workshop helped develop and disseminate several techniques, such as halftone and chemograms. A street is named after him in Oberkassel.

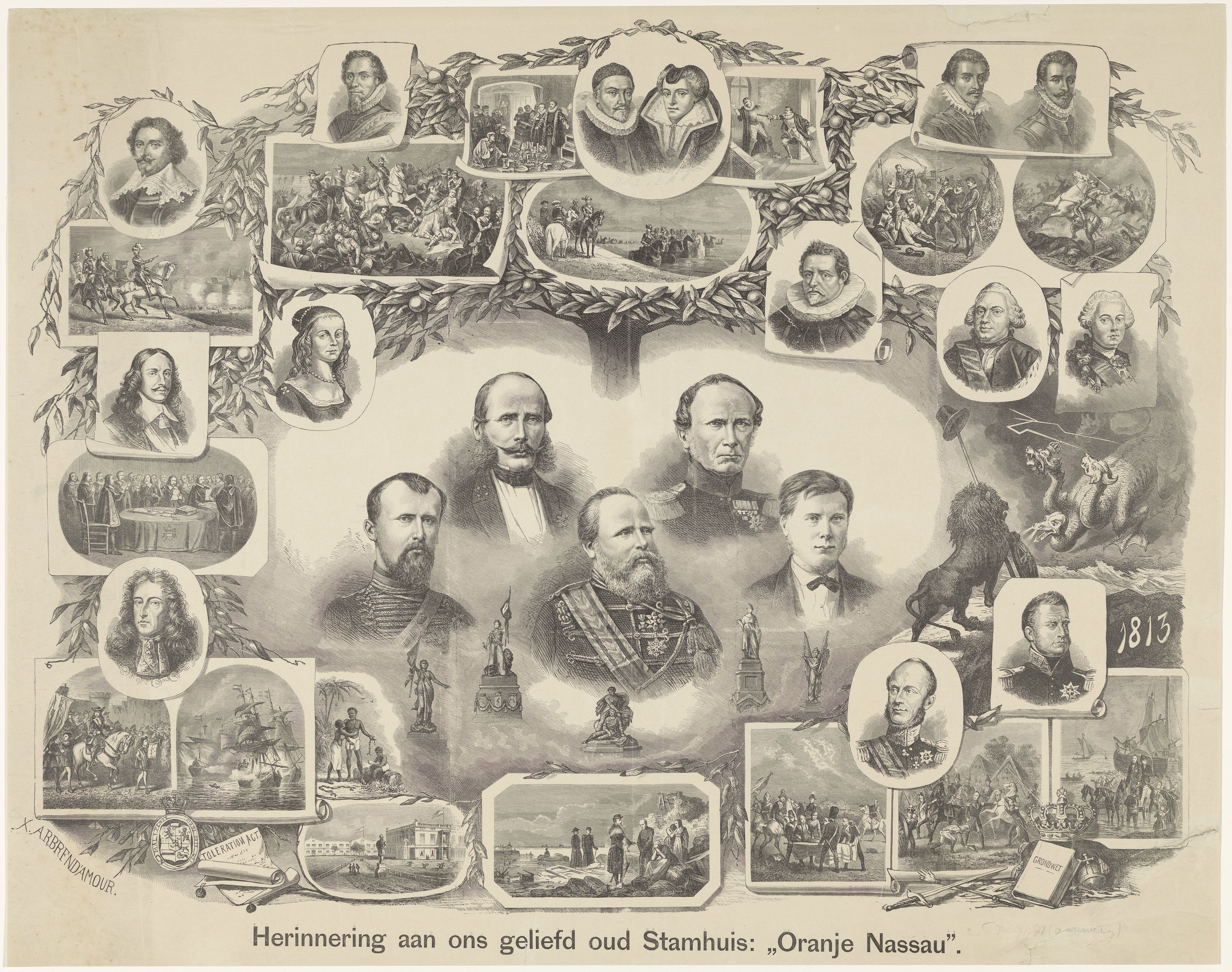
Memorial plaque for the Remembrance of the twenty-fifth anniversary of the reign of King William III

== Sources ==
- Rudolf Schmidt (Ed.): Deutsche Buchhändler. Deutsche Buchdrucker, Vol.1. Berlin/Eberswalde, 1902, pp.100–101
- "Brend’amour, Richard". In: Ulrich Thieme, Felix Becker (Eds.): Allgemeines Lexikon der Bildenden Künstler von der Antike bis zur Gegenwart, Vol.4: Bida–Brevoort. Wilhelm Engelmann, Leipzig 1910, pg.577 (Online)
- Eva-Maria Hanebutt-Benz: Studien zum deutschen Holzstich im 19. Jahrhundert, Buchhändler-Vereinigung, 1984, ISBN 3-7657-1262-0, pp.1189 f.
- "Brend'amour, Ruchard", In: Allgemeines Künstlerlexikon, Vol.14, Saur, 1996, ISBN 3-598-22754-X pg.108
- Hans Paffrath (Ed.): Lexikon der Düsseldorfer Malerschule 1819–1918, Vol. 1: "Abbema–Gurlitt", Kunstmuseum Düsseldorf and the Galerie Paffrath. Bruckmann, 1997, ISBN 3-7654-3009-9 pp.188–189
