= Ludwig Cauer =

German sculptor

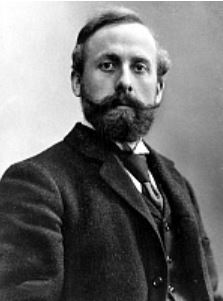
Ludwig Cauer (date unknown)

Ludwig Cauer (28 May 1866, Bad Kreuznach - 27 December 1947, Bad Kreuznach) was a German sculptor.

== Life ==
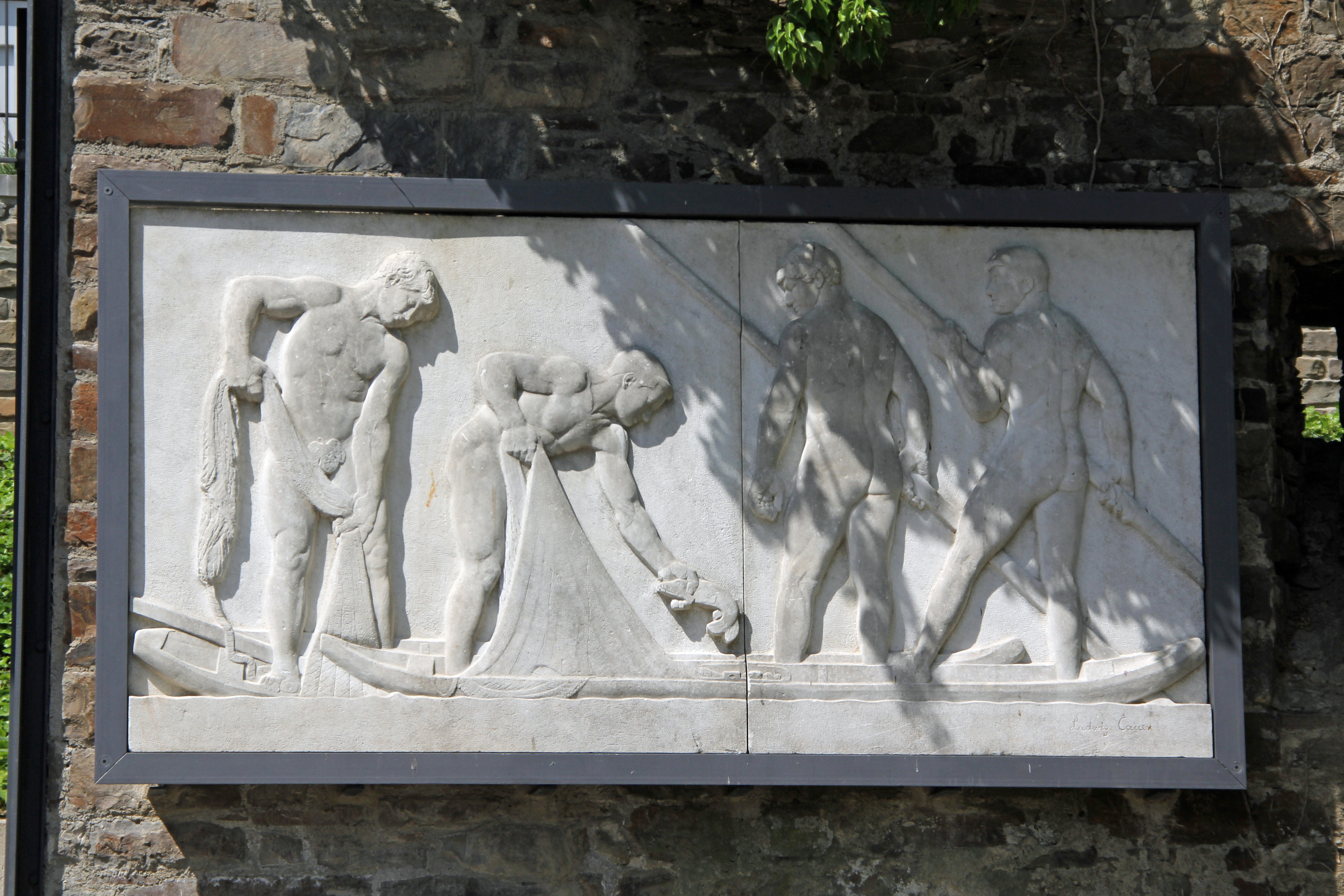
Fishermen (1915)

He was born into a family of sculptors who operated a workshop founded by his grandfather Emil Cauer the Elder. After Emil died in 1867, his father Karl and uncle Robert took over the studio and, when he was old enough, he received his first training there along with his brothers Emil, Robert and Hugo (1864-1918), who would also become sculptors of some note. At the age of fifteen, his father took him on a study trip to Rome. After his father died in 1885, he went to Berlin, where he worked in the studios of Albert Wolff and Reinhold Begas, passing the craftsman examination at Koblenz in 1887. This was followed by a year of military service.

He spent the years 1891 to 1893 in London then, after a brief stay in Bad Kreuznach, lived in Berlin from 1895 to 1905. During that time, he worked on the Siegesallee (Victory Avenue) project of Wilhelm II, also producing statues for fountains and contributing to the National Kaiser Wilhelm Monument.

After completing his part of the Siegesallee, he began working in a simpler style. In 1911, he was awarded the Villa Romana Prize and spent 1912 in Florence at the Villa as a guest of the Deutscher Künstlerbund. He was appointed a Professor at the Prussian Academy of Arts in 1916. After World War I, he returned to Bad Kreuznach and concentrated mostly on funerary art. In 1941, the Nazi government issued a Berufsverbot (professional disqualification) against him. Cauer was a member of the NSDAP and in 1944 was included in the list of the "Gottbegnadeten" ("the divinely gifted") published by the Reich Ministry for Popular Enlightenment and Propaganda under Joseph Goebbels.

His daughter Hanna and son Eduard also became sculptors.

== Selected works ==
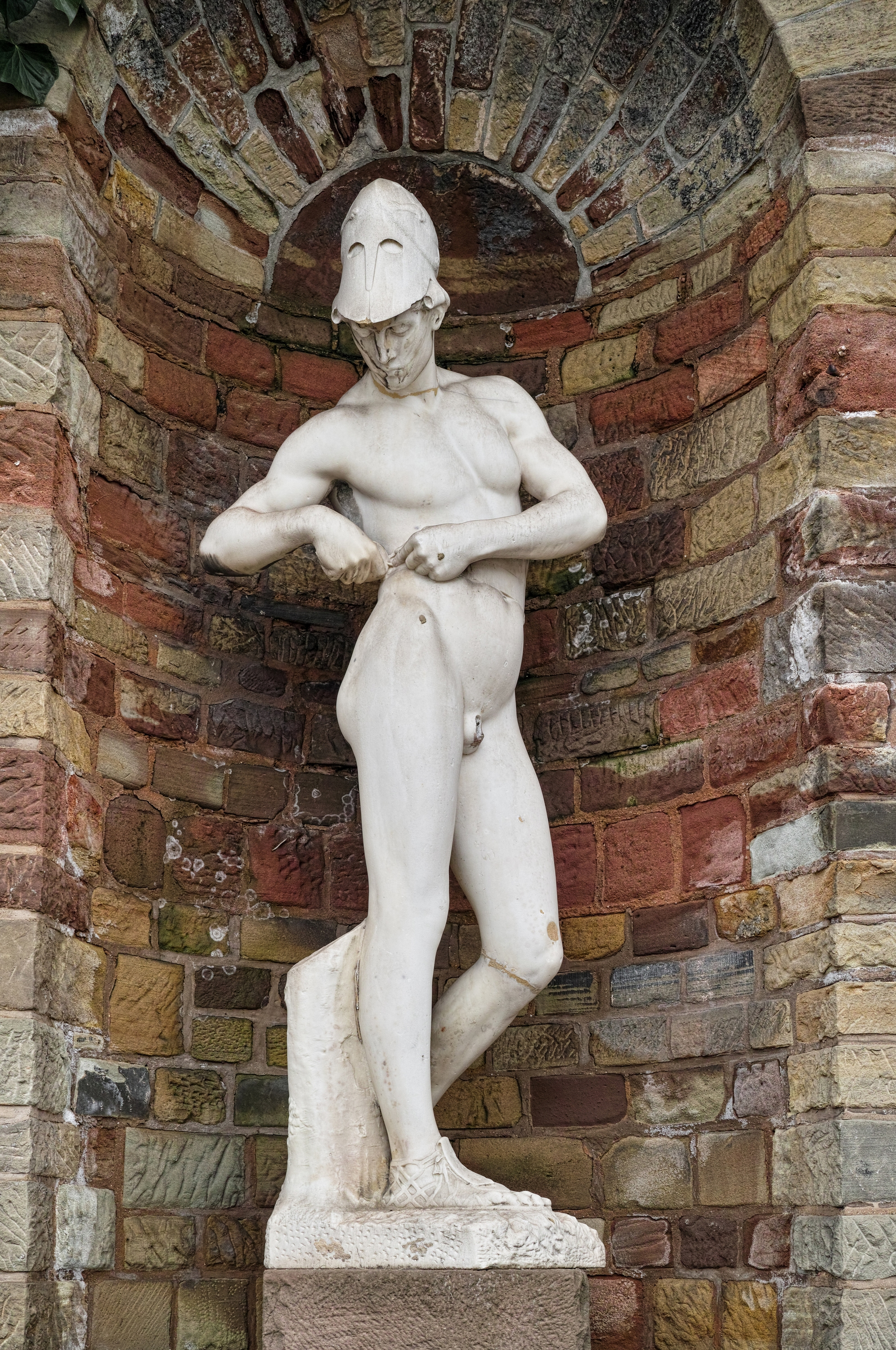
Young Telemachus (1902)

- 1892, "Thirst", an anti-war sculpture, in Bad Kreuznach.
- 1894, Sandstone statue of Conrad I of Germany in Villmar
- 1897-1900, Group 13 in the Siegesallee project, consisting of Charles IV, Holy Roman Emperor as the central figure; flanked by Dietrich Kagelwit (or "von Portitz", c.1300-1367), the Archbishop of Magdeburg, and Nikolaus von Bismarck (1307-1377), Margrave and Hofmeister. As with virtually all the Siegesallee statues, these were damaged in World War II. Charles IV lost his head. Cauer was the last surviving sculptor from the project and the only one who lived long enough to see the damage.
- 1901, Tritons and Naiads in the basin of the Bismarck Memorial on the Platz der Republik. The statues were moved in 1938 as part of Hitler's plan to renovate Berlin and the smaller figures were lost.
- 1902, "Young Telemachus", in the plaza at the City Hall in Saarbrücken. In 1936 it was dismantled and thought to be lost, but was rediscovered after the war and is now mounted in a niche along a suburban street.
- 1915, "Fishermen", relief in the Rheinanlangen promenade, Koblenz.
- 1925-1937 Figures from the Salian dynasty (Conrad II and his wife Gisela, Henry III, with smaller figures of Henry IV and Henry V), in the Dompark, Speyer. The work was commissioned by the NS Reich Minister of the Interior, Dr. Wilhelm Frick. Wilhelm Frick was significantly involved in the passing of the "Nuremberg Laws". These laws formed the basis for the discrimination against and persecution of the Jewish population. Wilhelm Frick was sentenced to death as a major war criminal by the International Military Tribunal in Nuremberg in 1946 and executed in that same year. The sculptures embraced a National Socialist conception of art with the aim to turn Speyer Cathedral into a National Socialist consecration site with the sculptures planned to be placed inside the cathedral vestibule, although this never happened during the Second World War.
