= Leopold Graf von Kalckreuth =

German painter (1855–1928)

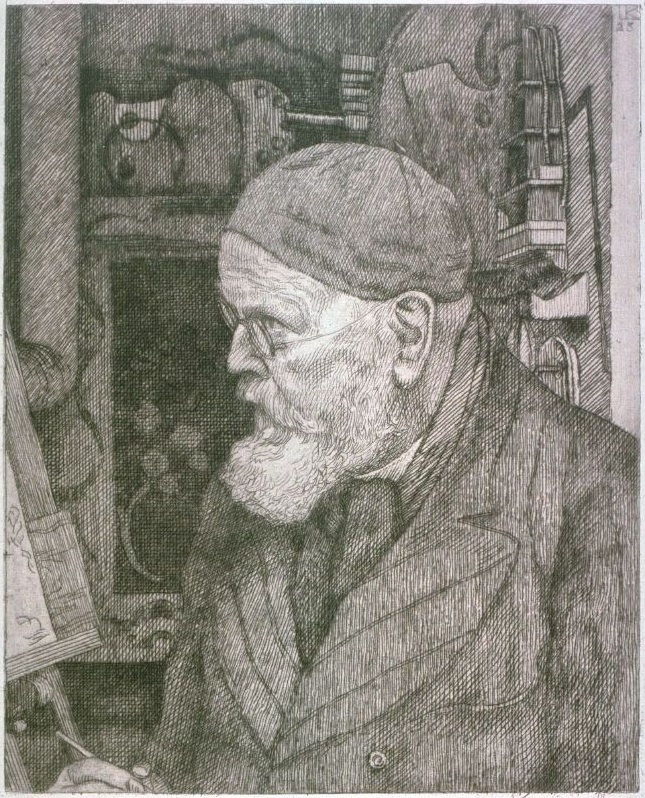
Self-portrait (1906)

Leopold Karl Walter Graf von Kalckreuth (15 May 1855 – 1 December 1928) was a German painter, known for portraits and landscapes.

== Biography ==
A direct descendant of field-marshal Friedrich Adolf Graf von Kalckreuth, Leopold was born at Düsseldorf, received his first training at Weimar from his father, the landscape painter Count Stanislaus von Kalckreuth (1820–1894), and subsequently studied at the academies of Weimar and Munich.

Although he painted some portraits remarkable for their power of expression, he devoted himself principally to depicting with relentless realism the monotonous life of the fishing folk on the sea-coast, and of the peasants in the fields. His palette is joyless, and almost melancholy, and in his technique he is strongly influenced by the impressionists. He was one of the founders of the secessionist movement. One of his students was Hellmut Eichrodt.

From 1885 to 1890, Count von Kalckreuth was professor at the Weimar art school. In 1890, he resigned his professorship and retired to his estate of Hockricht in Silesia, where he occupied himself in painting subjects drawn from the life of the country-folk. In 1895, he became a professor at the Academy of Fine Arts, Karlsruhe.

The Munich Pinakothek has his Rainbow and the Dresden Gallery his Old Age. Among his chief works are the Funeral at Dachau, Homewards, Wedding Procession in the Carpathian Mountains, The Gleaners, Before the Fish Auction, Summer, and Going to School.

Leopold's sister Maria was also a painter. Leopold's sister Clara was a pianist who studied with Clara Schumann and with Franz Liszt. A love of art and music was passed through this family to Leopold’s great-nephew, Dietrich Bonhoeffer (1906–1945), the German theologian and martyr who gave his life in opposing Adolf Hitler.

== Selected paintings ==
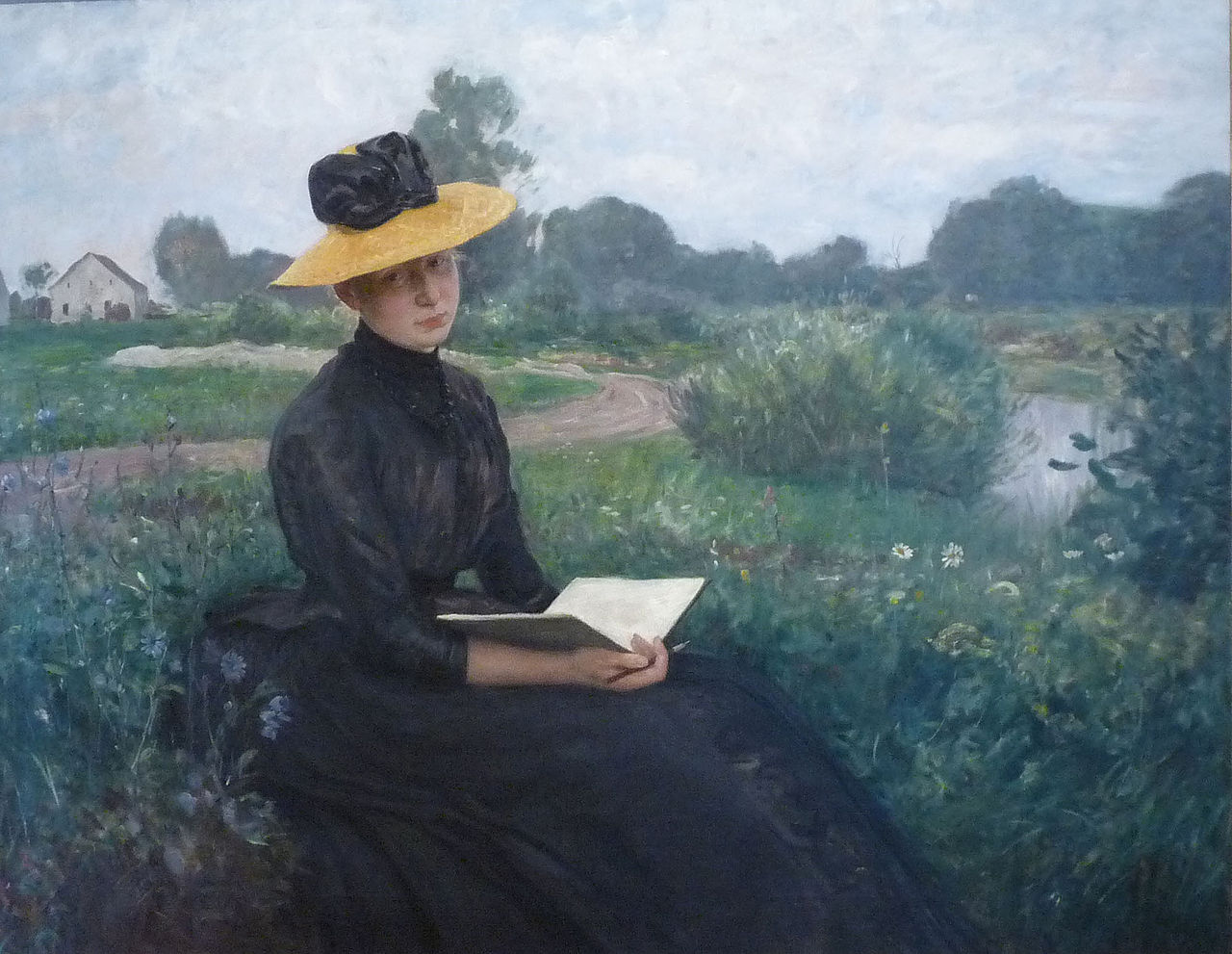
Portrait of Maria (1888), Leopold's sister

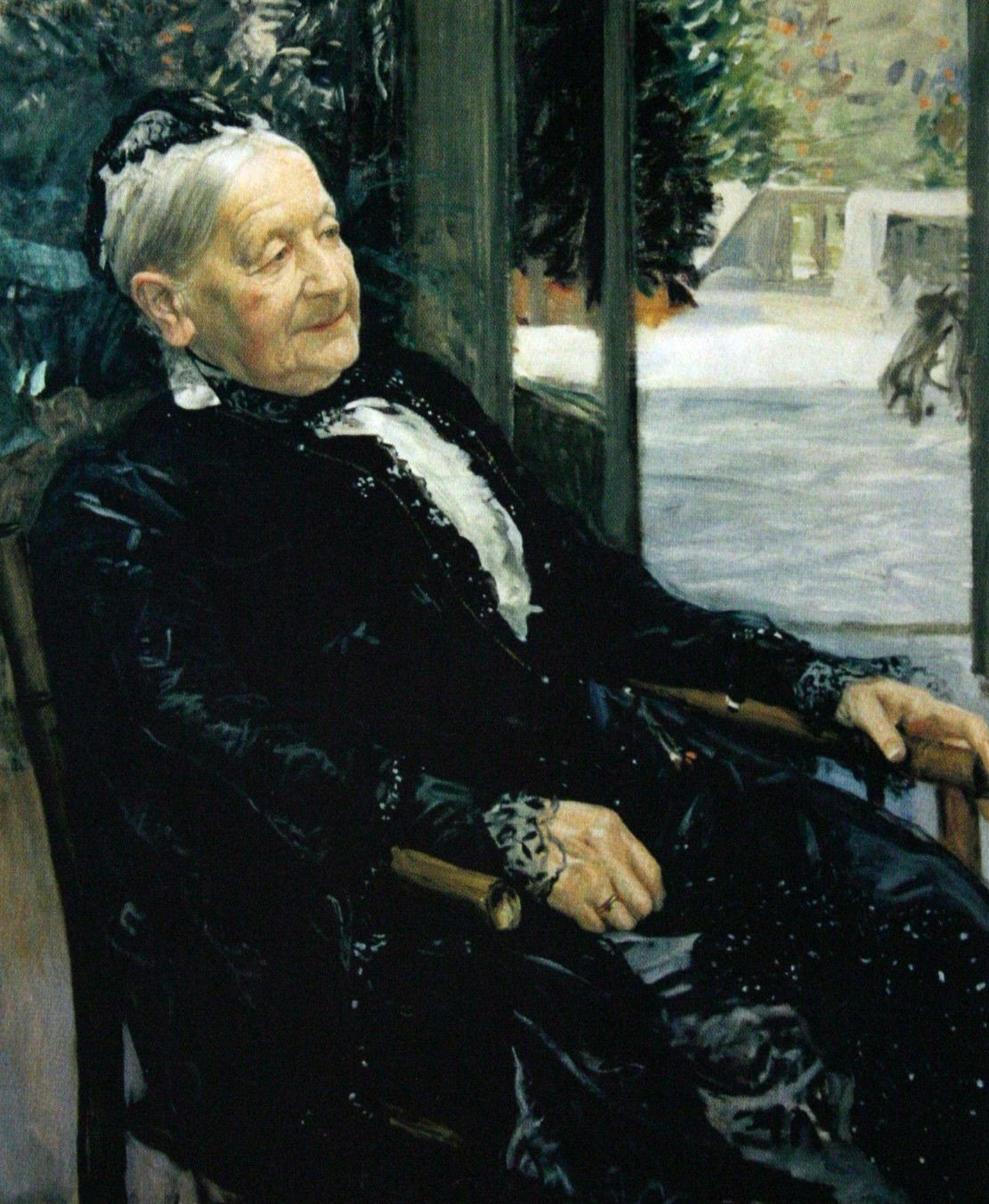
Laura Beit, mother of Alfred Beit

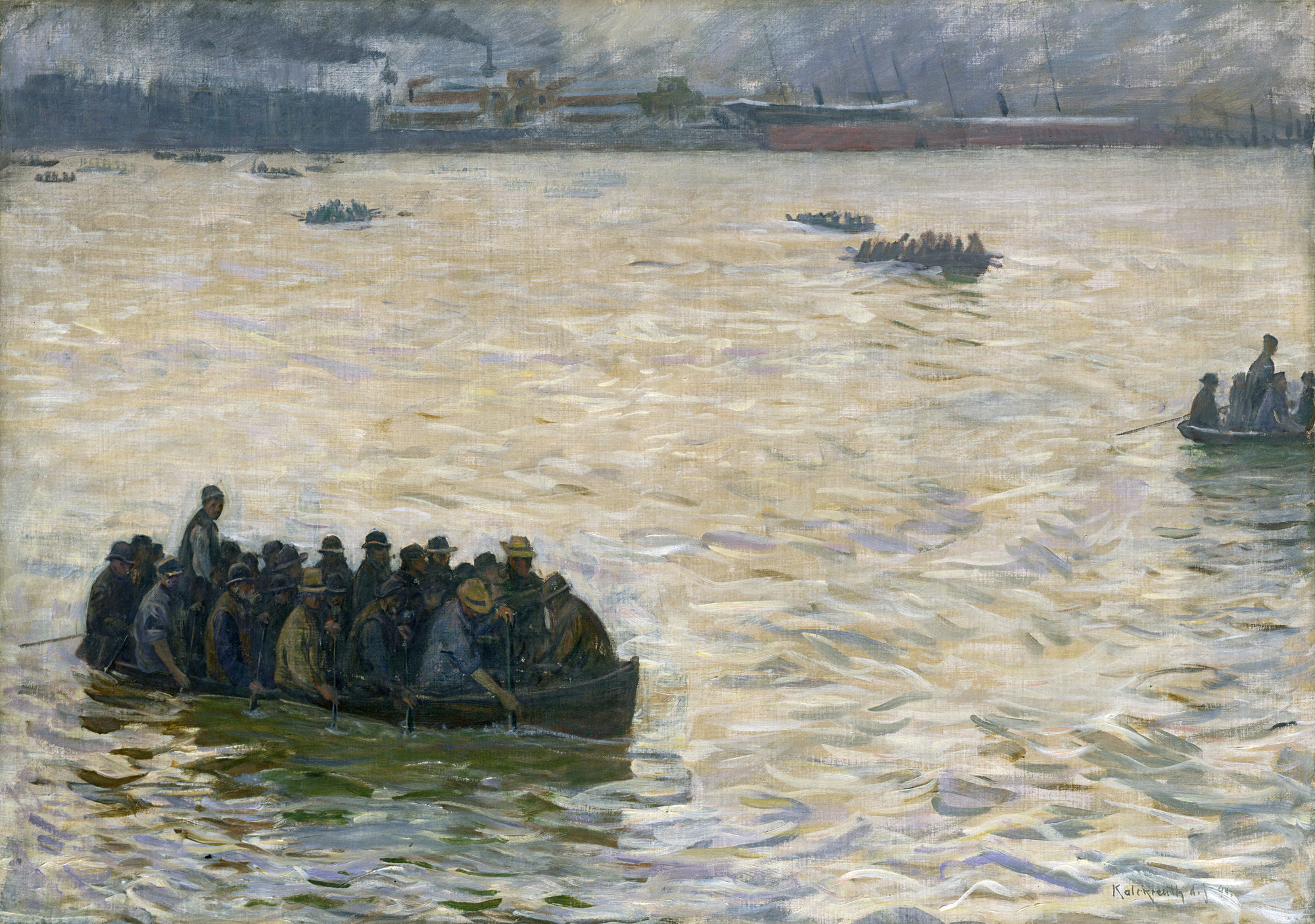
Longshoremen Quitting Work

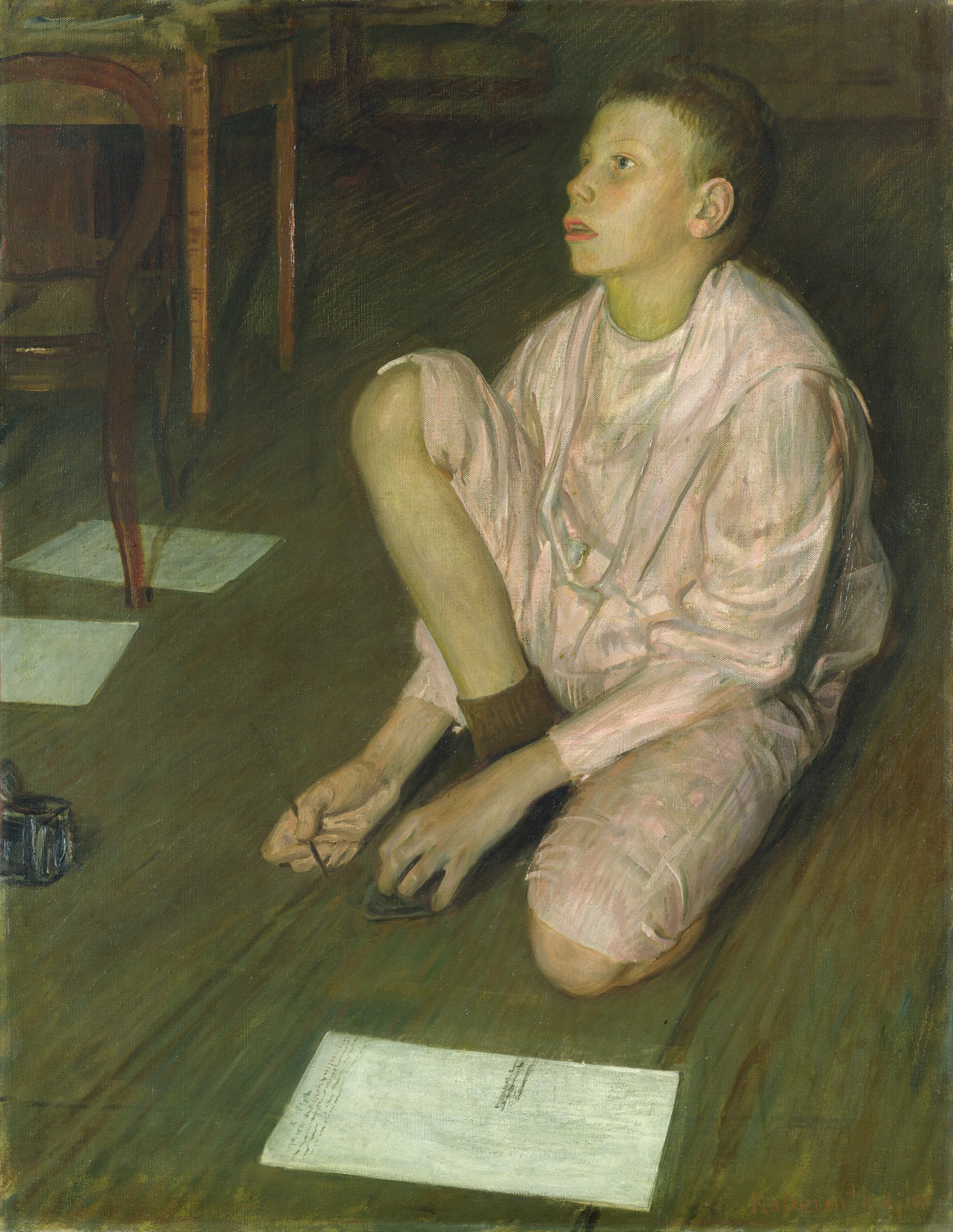
The Artist's Son, Wolf von Kalckreuth

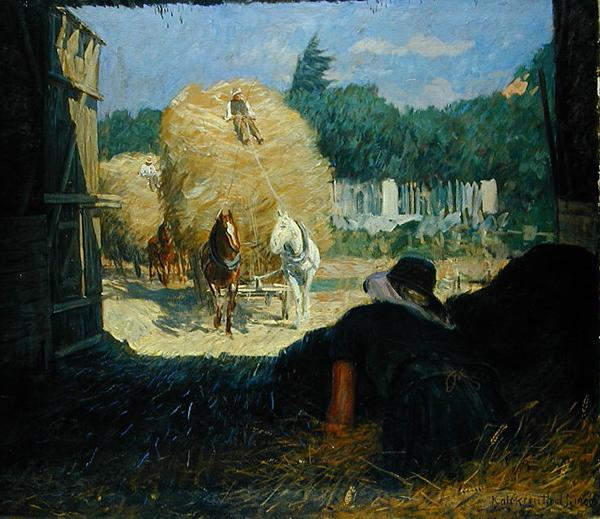
Harvest Time

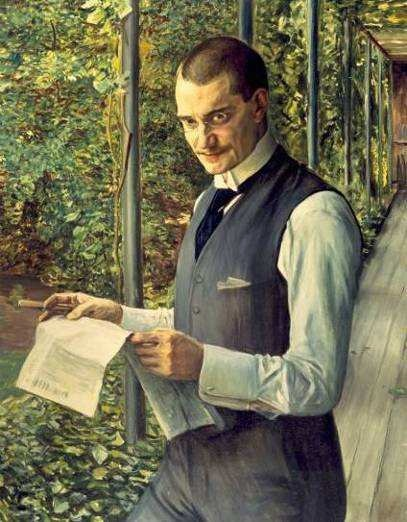
Franz Koenigs
