= Karl Cauer =

German sculptor

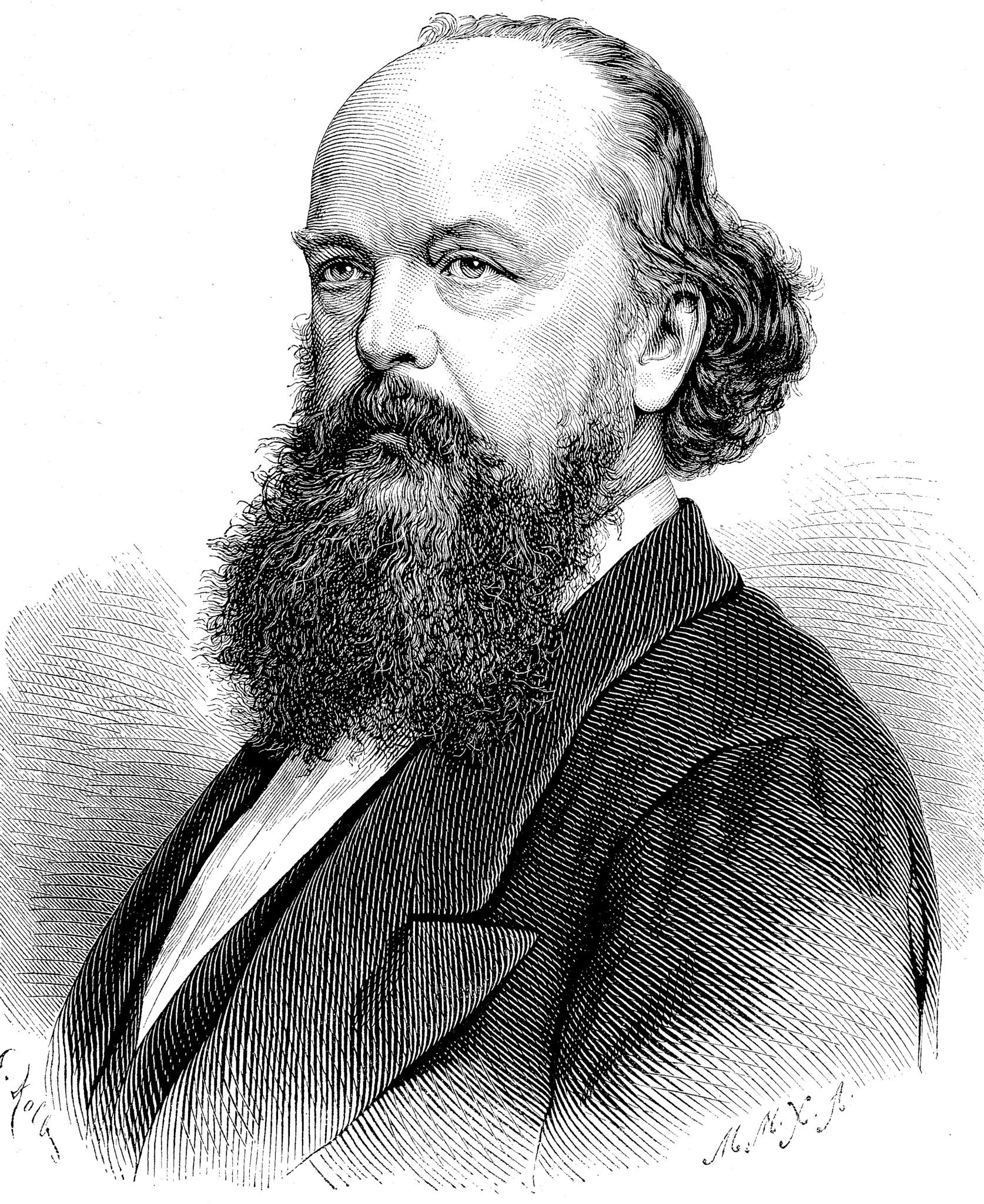
Karl Cauer (artist and date unknown)

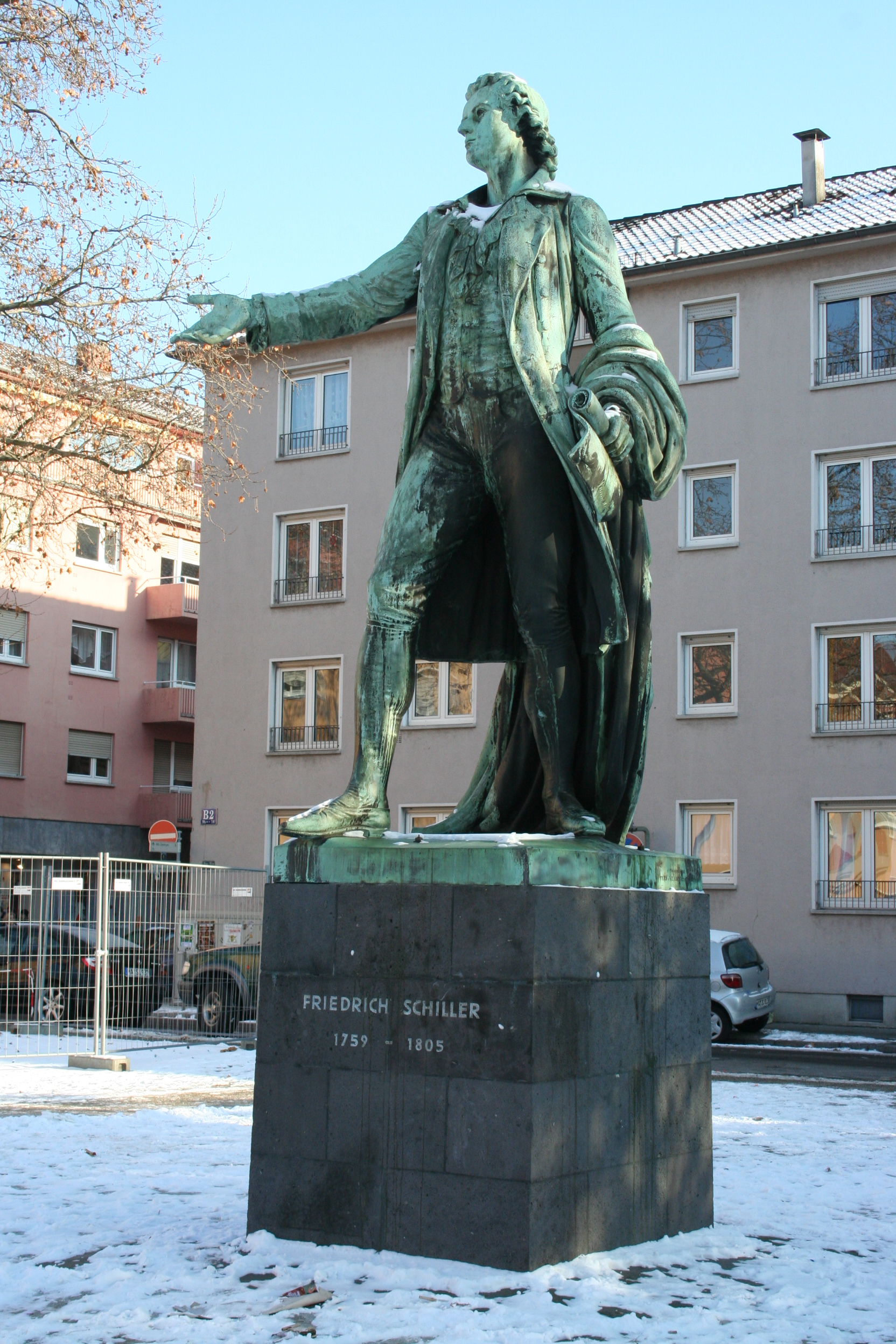
Friedrich Schiller Monument, Mannheim

Karl Ludwig Cauer (14 February 1828 – 17 April 1885) was a German sculptor in the Classical style.

== Life and work ==
Cauer was born in Bonn. His father, Emil Cauer the Elder, was a sculptor. His younger brother, Robert, became one as well. He and his wife, Magdalene (1828–1906) had seven children. Their five sons all became artists: Robert, Hugo (1864–1918), Ludwig and Emil were sculptors; Hans was a painter. His daughter, Maria (1861–1928) married the composer Arnold Mendelssohn.

He received his initial training in his family's workshop, then left for to Berlin, where he was given further instruction by Christian Daniel Rauch and Albert Wolff. In 1848, he moved to Rome to study antiquities. In 1851, he went to London to examine the Elgin Marbles, and stayed there until 1854; working as a portrait painter. He returned to Germany for three years, then went back to Rome, where he stayed until 1862.

That was the year he was commissioned to create one of his best known works; the monument to Friedrich Schiller in Mannheim. When that was completed, he settled in Bad Kreuznach and worked with his brother Robert at the family studio. After 1873, he divided his time between there and Rome, where he and Robert had another workshop. On behalf of the Prussian Ministry of Education, he was charge of producing casts of antiquities for use at art schools in Berlin. From 1877 to 1878, he was Chairman of the German Art Association there. After 1881, he remained in Bad Kreuznach.

In 1884, he visited the United States to attend the dedication of a monument in St. Louis that he had designed; honoring assassinated President James A. Garfield. When he returned, he was severely ill, so a major project, the Hutten Sickingen Monument in Bad Münster am Stein-Ebernburg, had to be completed by his sons Robert and Ludwig. He died in Bad Kreuznach early the following year, aged fifty-seven.

He is generally credited with being the inventor of Elfenbeingips (ivory gypsum), a molding substance and binding agent which is cheap and easy to clean.
