= Maria von Kalckreuth =

German painter

Countess Maria von Kalckreuth
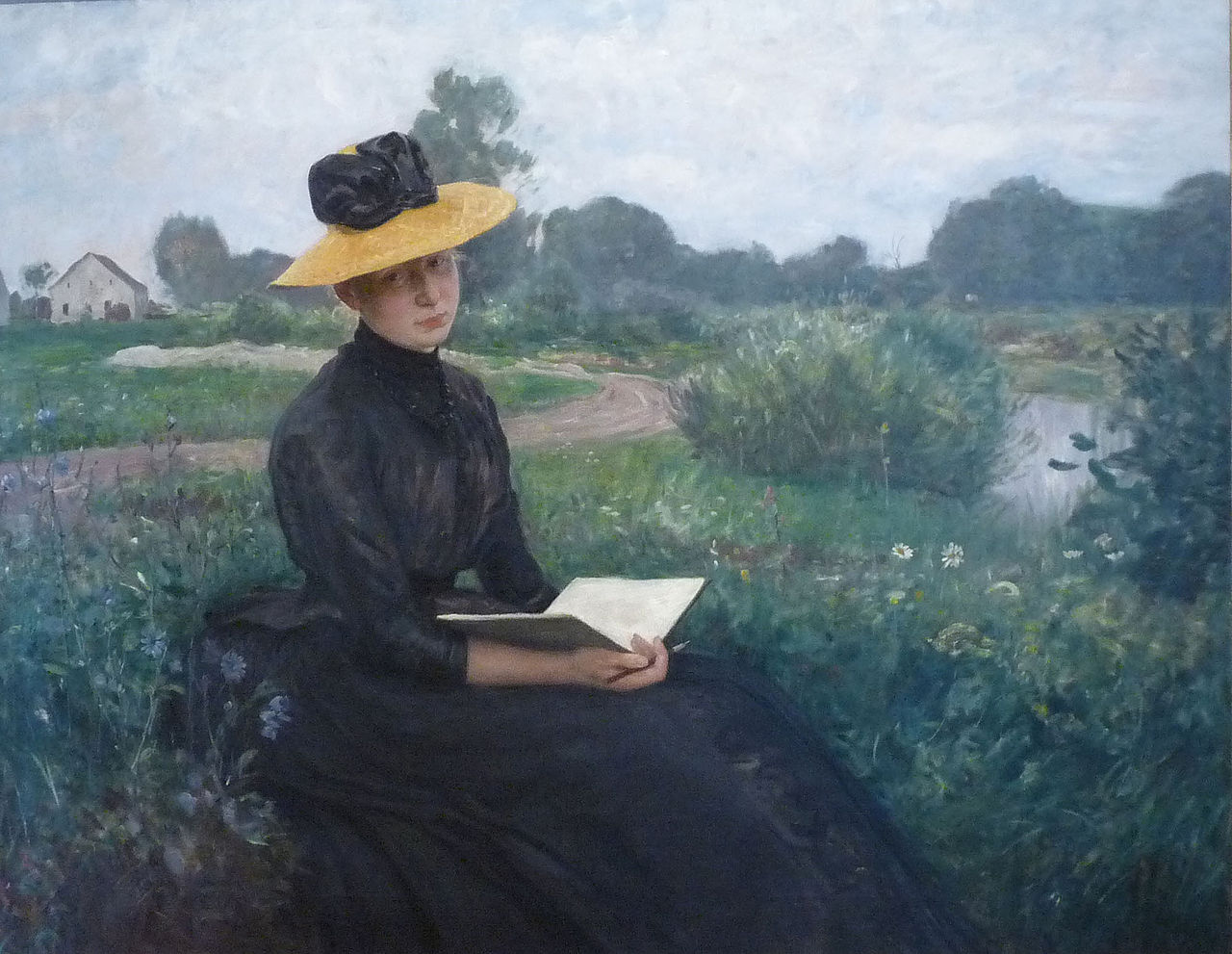
- Portrait of Maria von Kalckreuth by Leopold Graf von Kalckreuth
- Born: 1857; Düsseldorf, Germany
- Died: 1897 (aged 39–40); Dachau, Germany
- Known for: Painting

Countess Maria von Kalckreuth (1857–1897) was a German painter known for her portraits.

== Biography ==
Kalckreuth was born in 1857 in Düsseldorf, Kingdom of Prussia. Her brother Leopold Graf von Kalckreuth was also a painter. She was taught to paint by her father Stanislaus von Kalckreuth in Weimar. She continued her studies with Sándor Liezen-Mayer in Munich. Kalckreuth exhibited her work at the Woman's Building at the 1893 World's Columbian Exposition in Chicago, Illinois where she won a medal.

Kalckreuth died in 1897 in Dachau.

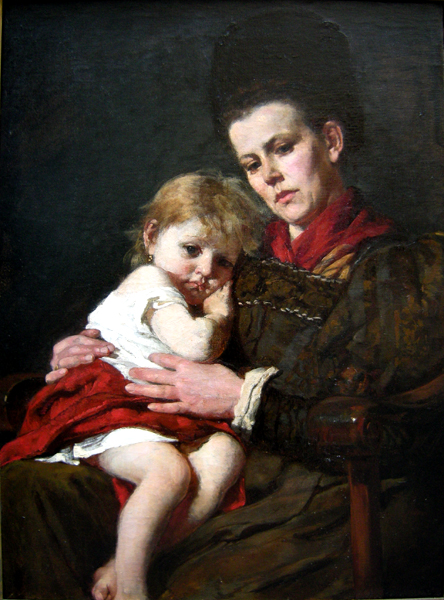
Portrait of Princess Maria Theresia von Hohenzollern with her child by Countess Maria von Kalckreuth, 1889
