= Erich Kauer =

German footballer

Personal information
- Date of birth: 8 January 1908
- Date of death: 30 December 1989 (aged 81)
- Position: Midfielder

Senior career*
Years	Team	Apps	(Gls)
- Tennis Borussia Berlin

International career
1930–1931	Germany	5	(0)
- * Club domestic league appearances and goals

Erich Kauer (8 January 1908 – 30 December 1989) was a German international footballer.
