= Emil Cauer the Elder =

German sculptor

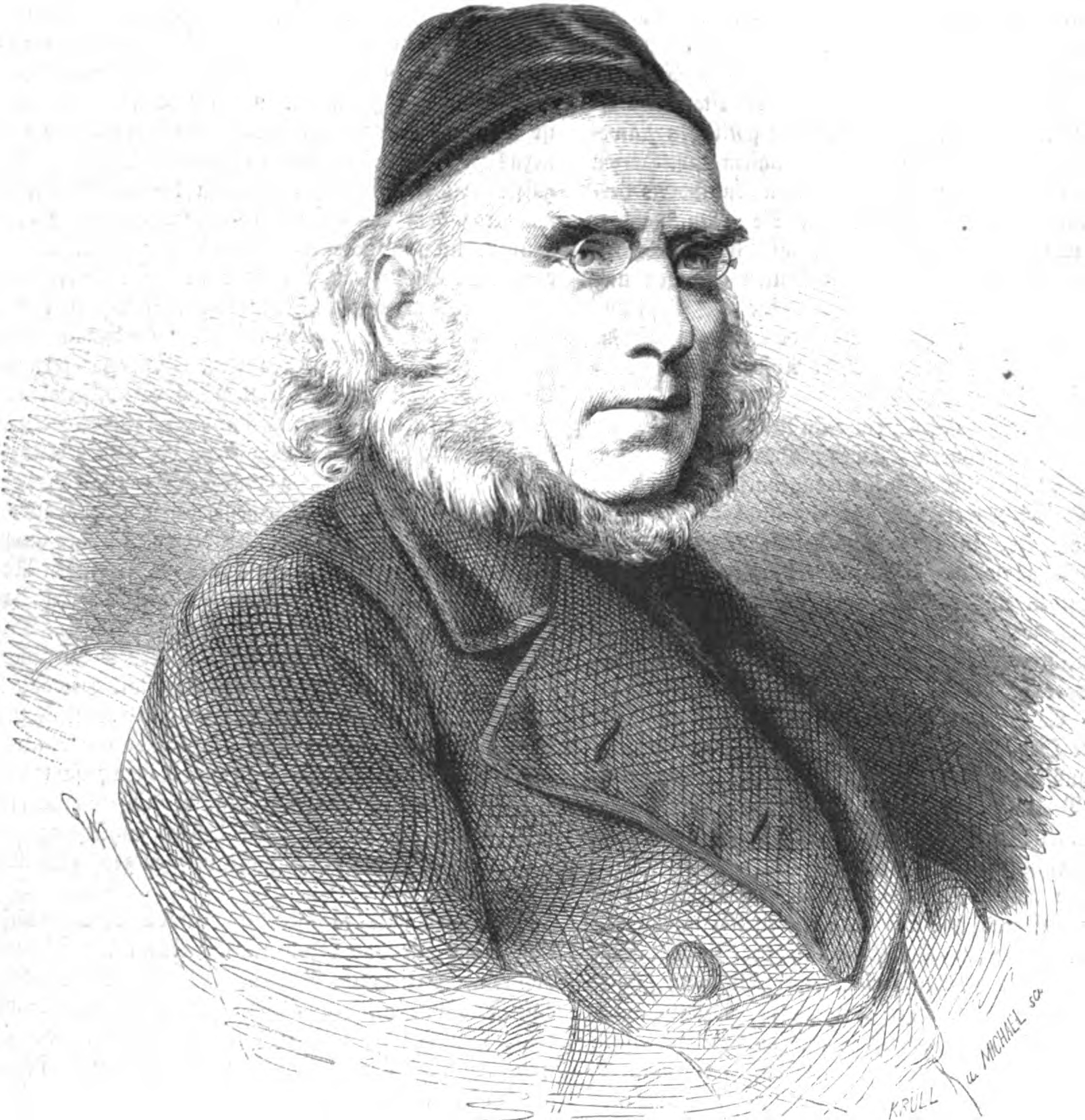
Emil Cauer; by Gustav Kruell (1867)

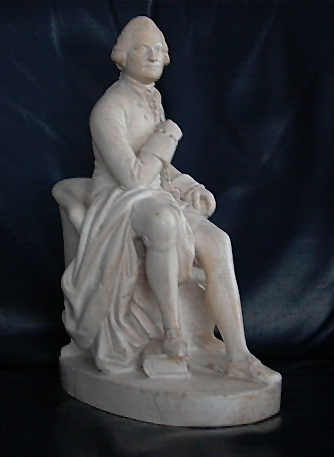
Posthumous figure of Lessing

Emil Cauer the Elder (29 November 1800 – 4 August 1867) was a German sculptor in the Classical style. Many of his children and grandchildren also became sculptors.

== Life and work ==
He was born in Dresden to Carl Ludwig Cauer (1750–1813), a general practitioner. After his father's death, his eldest brother, Ludwig, took him to Berlin. There, in 1821, he enrolled at the Prussian Academy of Arts. The following year, he was employed in the studios of Christian Daniel Rauch. In 1824, he moved to Munich, but stayed there for only a year, then moved again to take a position as a drawing teacher at the University of Bonn. He was there for four years; focusing on portrait busts.

In 1829, on Rauch's recommendation, he was named Curator of the Skulpturensammlung in Dresden. Three years later, having spent all of his inheritance, he moved to Bad Kreuznach, once again becoming a drawing teacher, this time at the Gymnasium an der Stadtmauer, succeeding Eduard von Leslie.

After a few years, inspired by the works of Ludwig Michael Schwanthaler, he opened his studio there and made himself known through a series of statuettes depicting historical personalities, such as Franz von Sickingen, Ulrich von Hutten, Götz von Berlichingen, Martin Luther, Gotthold Ephraim Lessing and Emperor Charles V. He also created characters from folklore and Shakespeare, as well as religious figures. Many of these were widely distributed through replicas.

His sons, Robert and Karl also became well-known sculptors, as did his grandson, Robert. His daughter Anna (1829–1881) married the painter Stanislaus von Kalckreuth.

Cauer died in Bad Kreuznach in 1867.

== Sources ==
- Wilhelm Schmidt (1876). "Cauer, Emil". Allgemeine Deutsche Biographie (in German). Vol. 4. Leipzig: Duncker & Humblot. p. 76.
- Elisabeth Heimpel (1957). "Cauer". Neue Deutsche Biographie (in German). Vol. 3. Berlin: Duncker & Humblot. pp. 178–178. (full text online). (Family article)
- Elke Masa: Die Bildhauerfamilie Cauer im 19. und 20. Jahrhundert. Neun Bildhauer aus vier Generationen – Emil Cauer d. Ä., Carl Cauer, Robert Cauer d. Ä., Robert Cauer d. J., Hugo Cauer, Ludwig Cauer, Emil Cauer d. J., Stanislaus Cauer, Hanna Cauer. Gebr. Mann, Berlin 1989, ISBN 3-7861-1582-6
