= Hellmut Eichrodt =

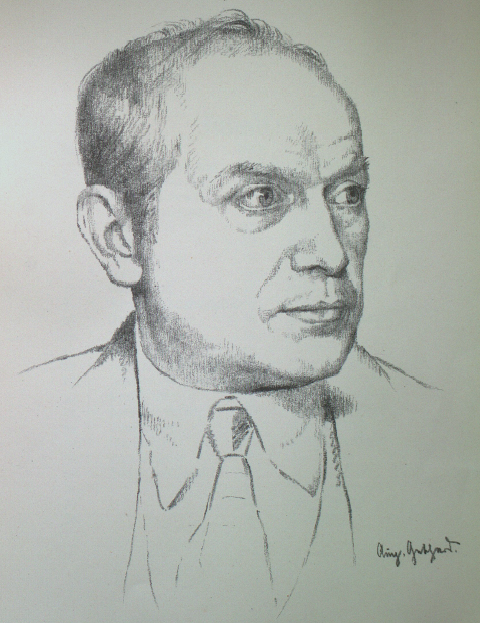
Hellmut Eichrodt. Drawing by August Gebhardt

Hellmut Eichrodt (27 February 1872 in Bruchsal – 31 July 1943 in Karlsruhe) was a German painter and graphic artist.

== Biography ==
Hellmut Eichrodt, younger brother of Otto Eichrodt, studied from 1890 to 1903 at the Karlsruher Kunstakademie and was apprenticed with Hans Thoma and Leopold Graf von Kalckreuth. From 1897 to 1912 he worked at the magazine Jugend, and for Simplicissimus. Besides his graphic art, he painted murals in churches and other public buildings, including one for the mausoleum in Addis Abeba of Ethiopian emperor Menelik II, and multiple murals in the Karlsruher Christuskirche.

In the holdings of the Karlsruher Kunsthalle are two women's portraits by Eichrodt. Because of his collaboration with the Kunstdruckerei Künstlerbund Karlsruhe he received a number of commissions for advertisements, and designed posters for a number of companies including Brauerei Ketterer, Kast & Ehinger, Badische Feuerversicherungsbank, and the Norddeutscher Lloyd. For Friedrich Dreser he created collections of images, Der Froschkönig, Der Soldat (1908) and Die sieben Raben (1909). He signed his collection with "H-E". In 1918 he illustrated the call to the soldiers of the Grand Duchy of Baden to lay down their arms and return home.

== Literature ==
- Eichrodt, Hellmuth in Thieme-Becker: Allgemeines Lexikon der Bildenden Künstler von der Antike bis zur Gegenwart. Bd. 13 (E), p. 87 together with Hans Vollmer (ed.): Allgemeines Lexikon der bildenden Künstler des XX. Jahrhunderts. Zweiter Band (E bis J), p. 331, E. A. Seemann (CD-ROM), Leipzig 2008. ISBN 978-3-86502-177-9.
