= Robert Cauer the Elder =

German sculptor (1831–1893)

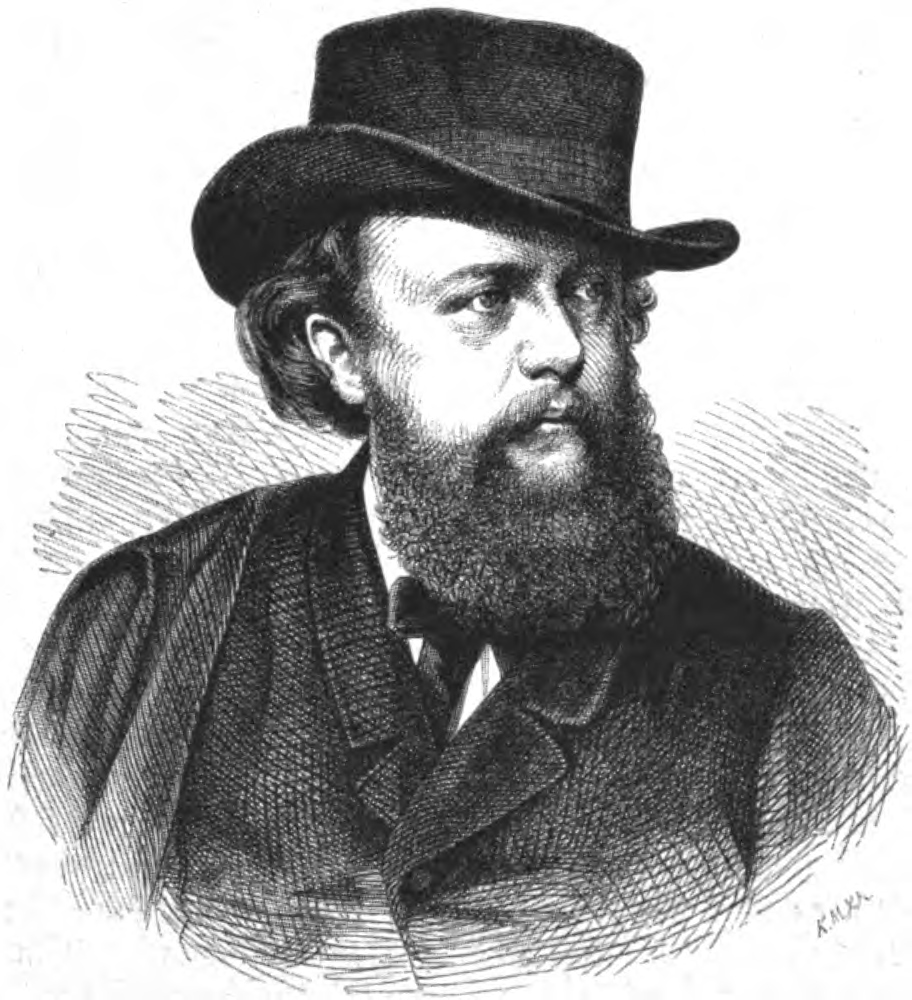
Robert Cauer the Elder; portrait by Gustav Kruell (1867)

Robert Cauer the Elder (13 February 1831 – 2 April 1893) was a German sculptor known for his funerary art.

== Life and work ==
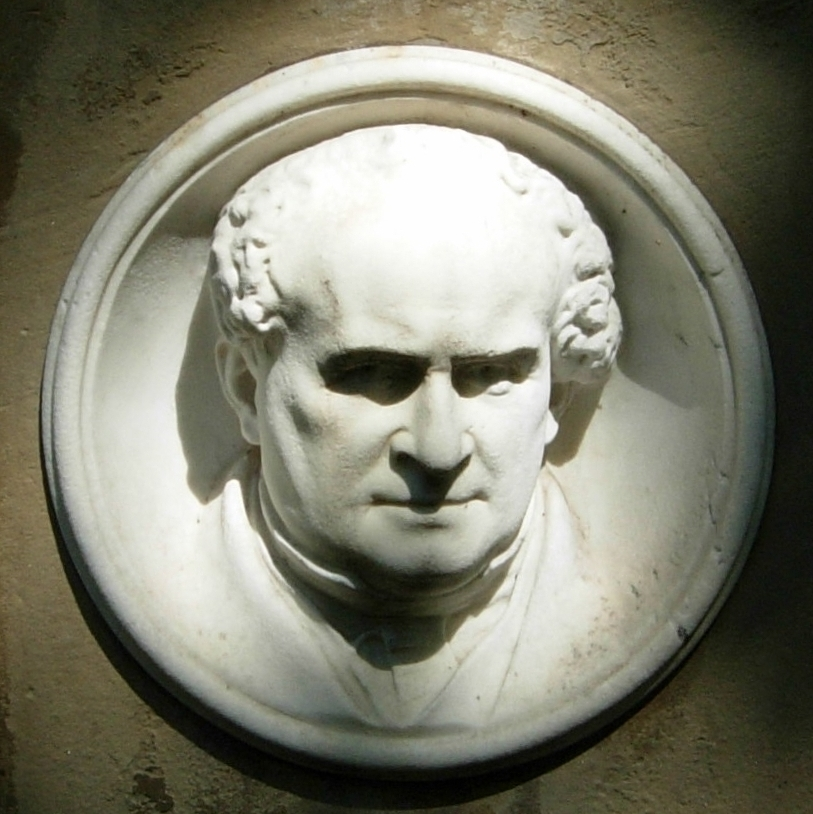
A tondo on the gravestone of Ludwig Schopen

Cauer was born in Dresden. His father, Emil Cauer the Elder and brother, Karl were both sculptors. Many of his descendants and relatives also became sculptors, including his sons, Stanislaus and Friedrich, and Karl's sons, Emil and Hugo (1864–1918).

He received his first lessons at his father's studio in Bad Kreuznach. From 1851 to 1856, he studied painting at the Kunstakademie Düsseldorf with Wilhelm von Schadow and Karl Ferdinand Sohn. From 1853 to 1854, he also studied at the academy's building school with Rudolf Wiegmann. From 1851 to 1857, he was a member of Malkasten, a progressive artists' association. After completing his studies, he worked with his father and returned to Sculpting, but never gave up painting entirely. Between 1856 and 1861, he made numerous study trips throughout Germany, England and Italy. In 1882, he settled in Rome, where he would live for the rest of his life.

Together with his brother, Karl, he set up a studio there, but would continue to be involved with the one in Bad Kreuznach. From 1887, he was officially commissioned by the Prussian government to supervise their scholarship students at the Villa Strohl-Fern. The following year, he was named a Professor. After 1889, he divided his time between Rome and Kassel. Cauer died in Kassel in 1893.

His sculptures were inspired by topics from literature and folklore, and he often emulated his father's works. He also created numerous portrait plaques that were based on Classical models.

His most familiar works may be his grave monuments, including several at the Alter Friedhof, Bonn, notably those of Friedrich Wilhelm August Argelander and Nikolaus Simrock.

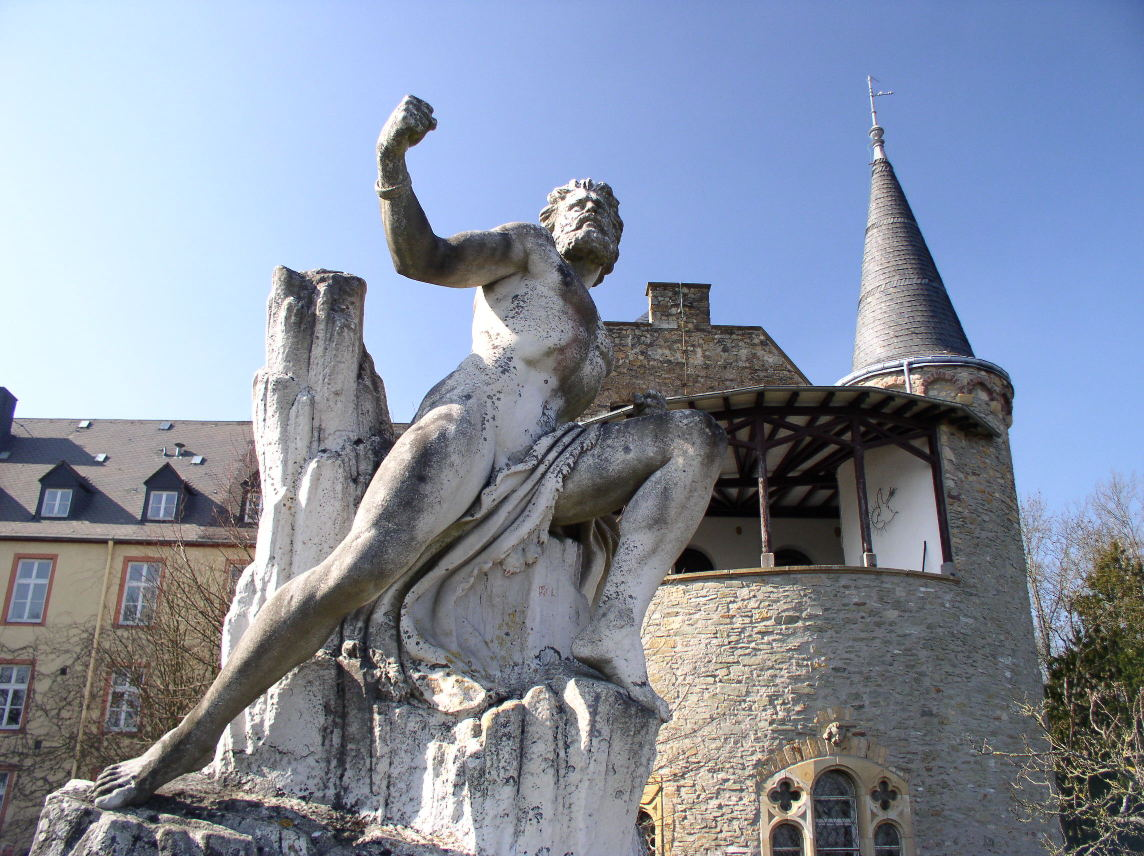
Prometheus, in the park at the ruins of Dhaun Castle
