= Gustav Kruell =

German-American engraver

- Born: October 31, 1843; Düsseldorf, Germany
- Died: January 2, 1907 (aged 63); San Luis Obispo, California
- Known for: Co-founder of the Society of American Wood Engravers, 1881
- Notable work: "Rent Day", "Harriet Beecher Stowe", "Abraham Lincoln"
- Spouse: Clara Kuhn Kruell

Gustav Kruell (October 31, 1843 – January 2, 1907) was a German-born American wood engraver who specialized in portraits. In 1881, he was a co-founder of the Society of American Wood Engravers.

== Life and work ==
He was born in Düsseldorf, Germany, on October 31, 1843. He studied art under Richard Brend'amour. In 1873, at the age of 30, he emigrated to the United States to work in New York City for several leading periodicals.

The following year, he was joined by his wife Clara Kuhn Kruell (of Stuttgart, Germany), their two daughters and their two sons. They settled in East Orange, New Jersey. There, he came under the influence of the famed engraver, William James Linton.

He died in San Luis Obispo, California, on January 2, 1907.

In 1929, Ralph Clifton Smith edited a ninety-eight page collection of Kruell's works called Gustav Kruell, American portrait engraver on wood.

Currently, the British Museum houses over 12 works by Gustav Kruell; including a self-portrait, a portrait of his own father, as well as portraits of Auguste Rodin, Wendell Phillips Garrison, James Russell Lowell and Pierre Puvis de Chavannes, and scenes such as "A Fishmarket in Venice", "The Flight of Night" and "The Discoverer".

The Pennsylvania Academy of the Fine Arts currently houses over 6 works by Gustav Kruell; including portraits of William M. Chase, and Walter Shirlaw.

== Exhibition history ==
- 1890, Kruell's first exhibit was at the Museum of Fine Arts Boston, which included portraits of Charles Darwin and William Lloyd Garrison.
- 1893, World's Columbian Exposition (Chicago), (medal)
- 1889, Exposition Universelle (Paris)
- 1895, Kruell exhibited more than 200 works at New York City's Keppel Gallery on East Sixteenth Street.
- 1901, Pan-American Exposition (Buffalo)(silver medal)
- 1904, Louisiana Purchase Exposition (St Louis), (gold medal)

== Selected works ==
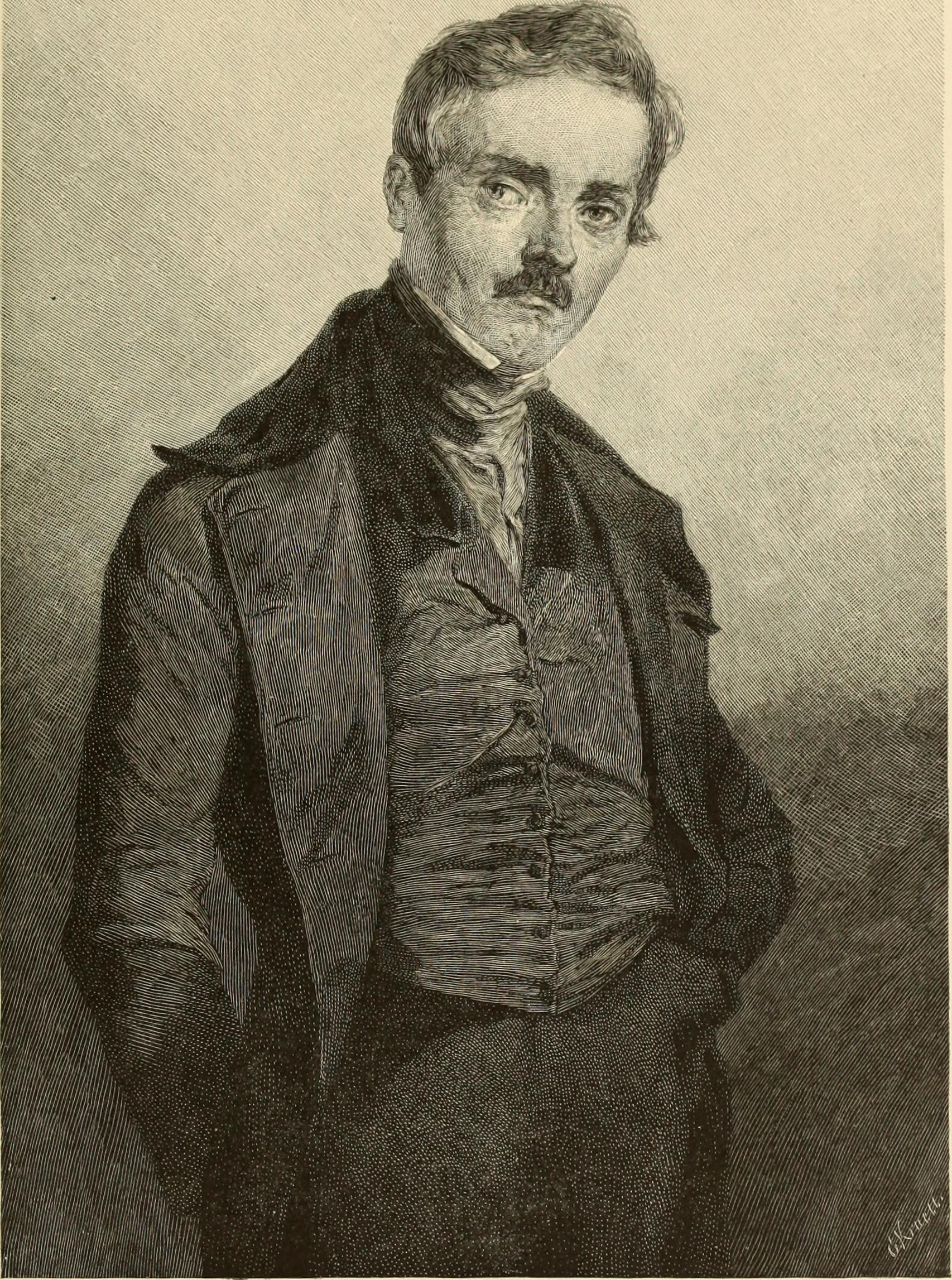
Antoine-Louis Barye (1892)

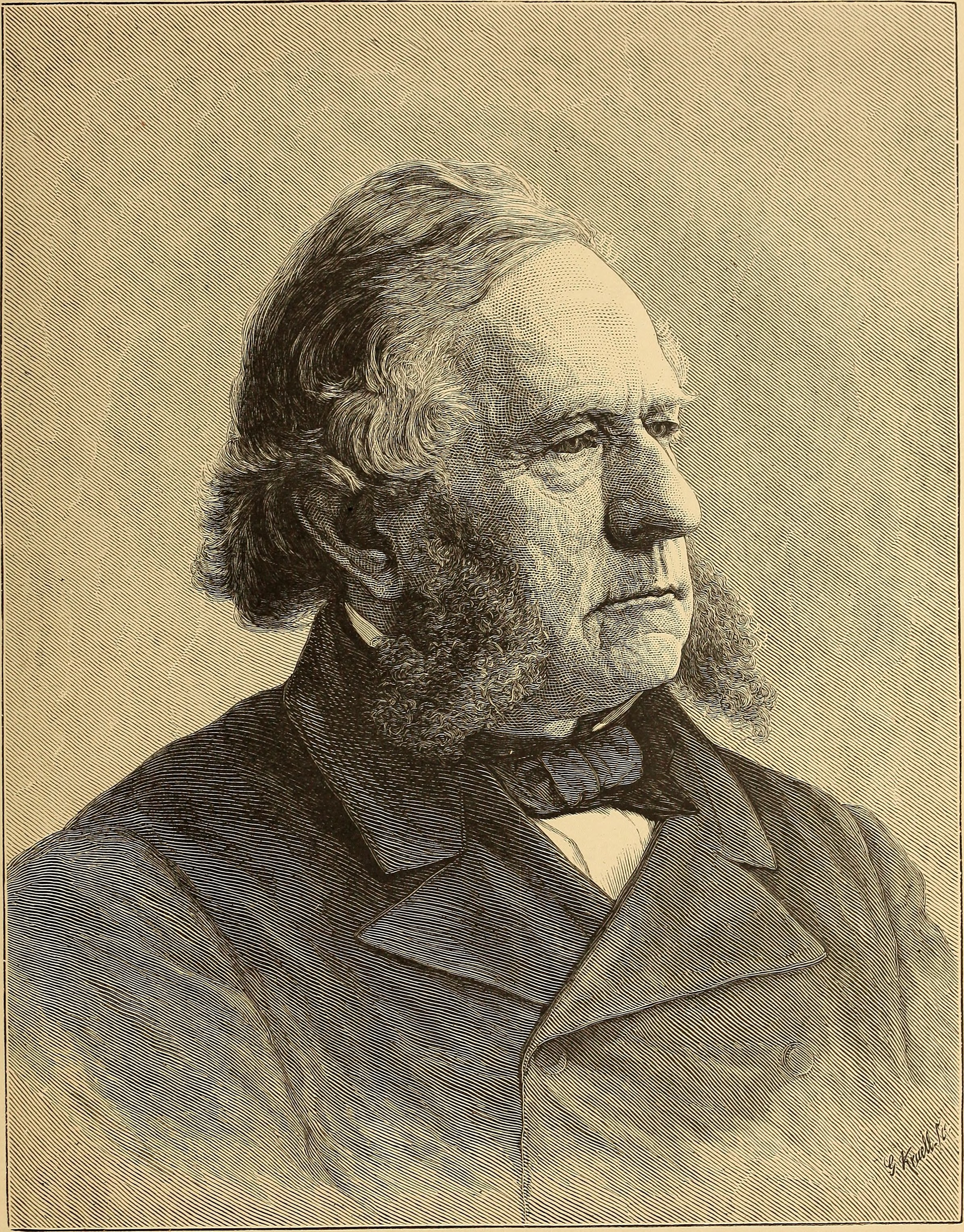
Fletcher Harper (1889)

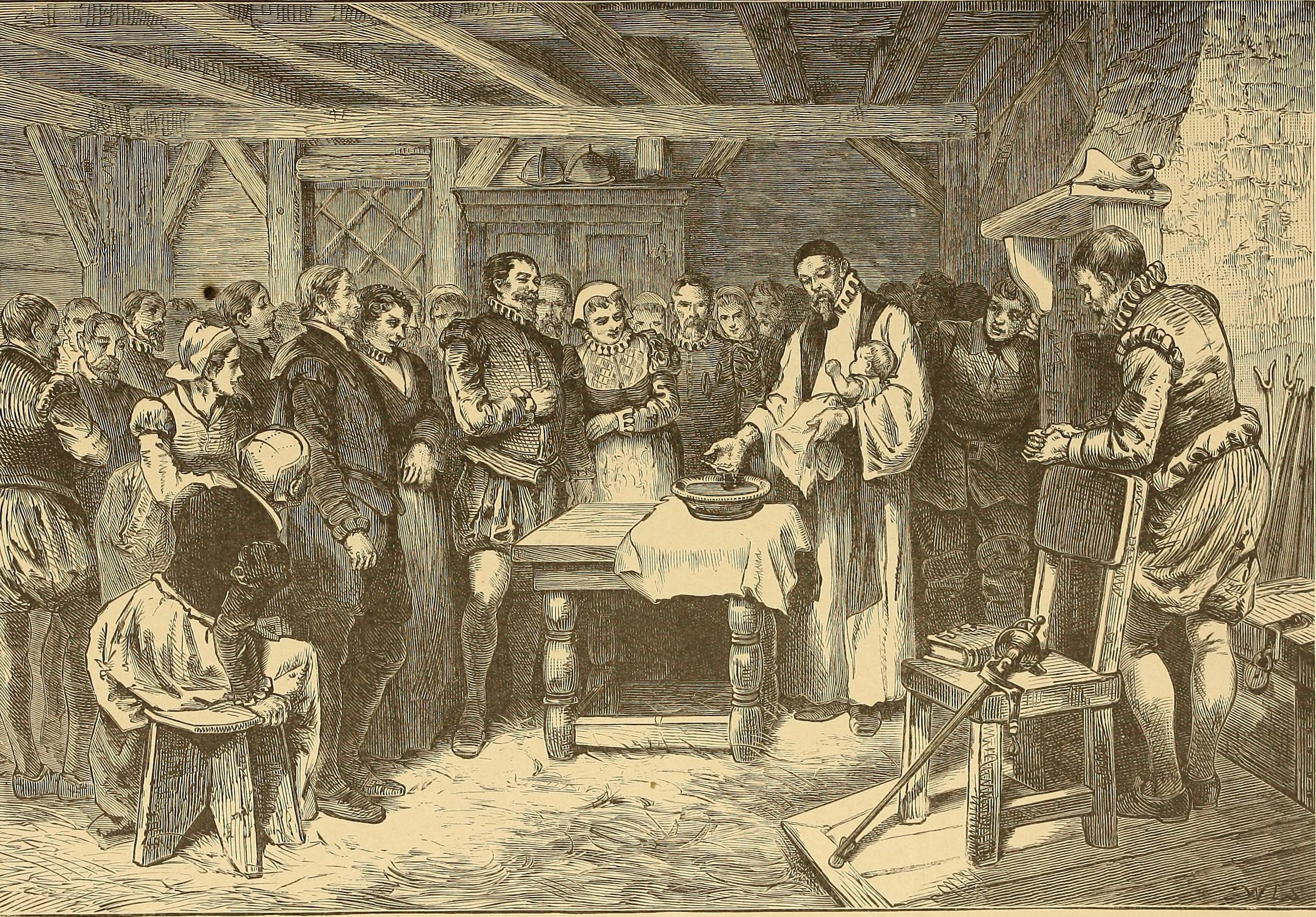
The Baptism of Virginia Dare, from American Art by Walter Montgomery

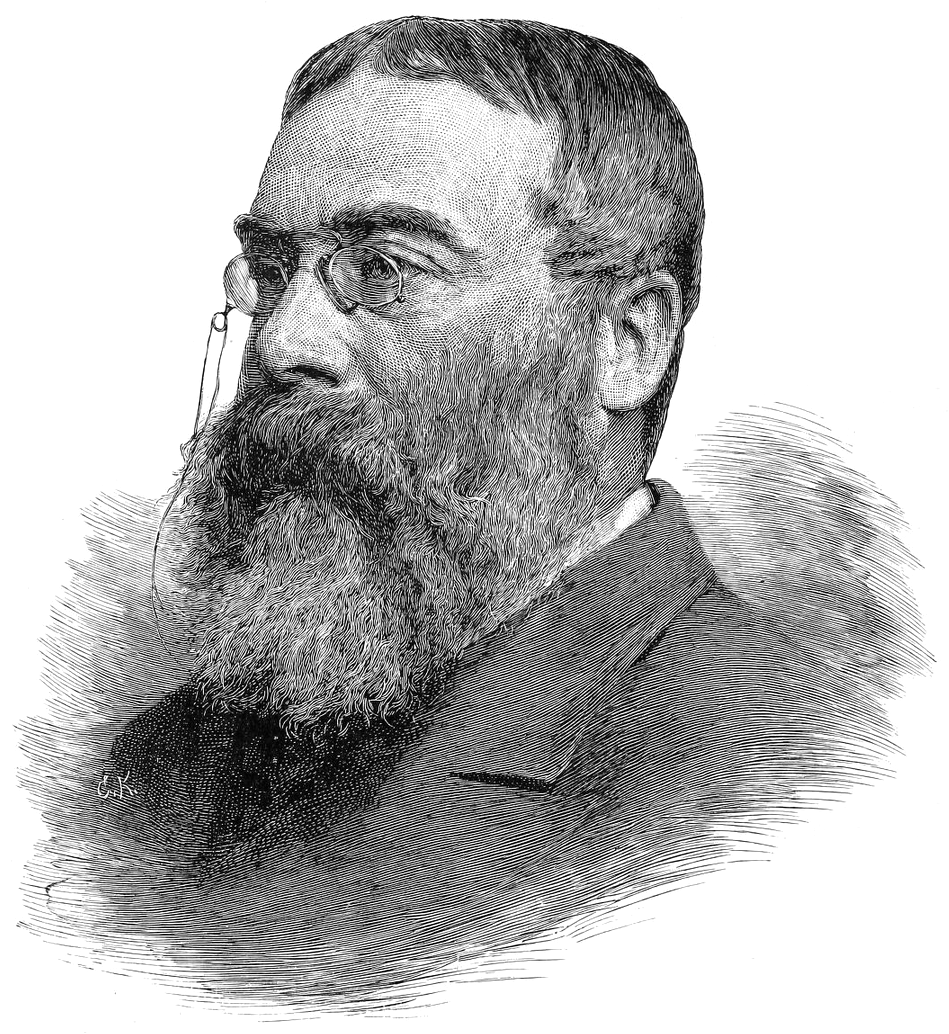
Sir Walter Besant (1890)

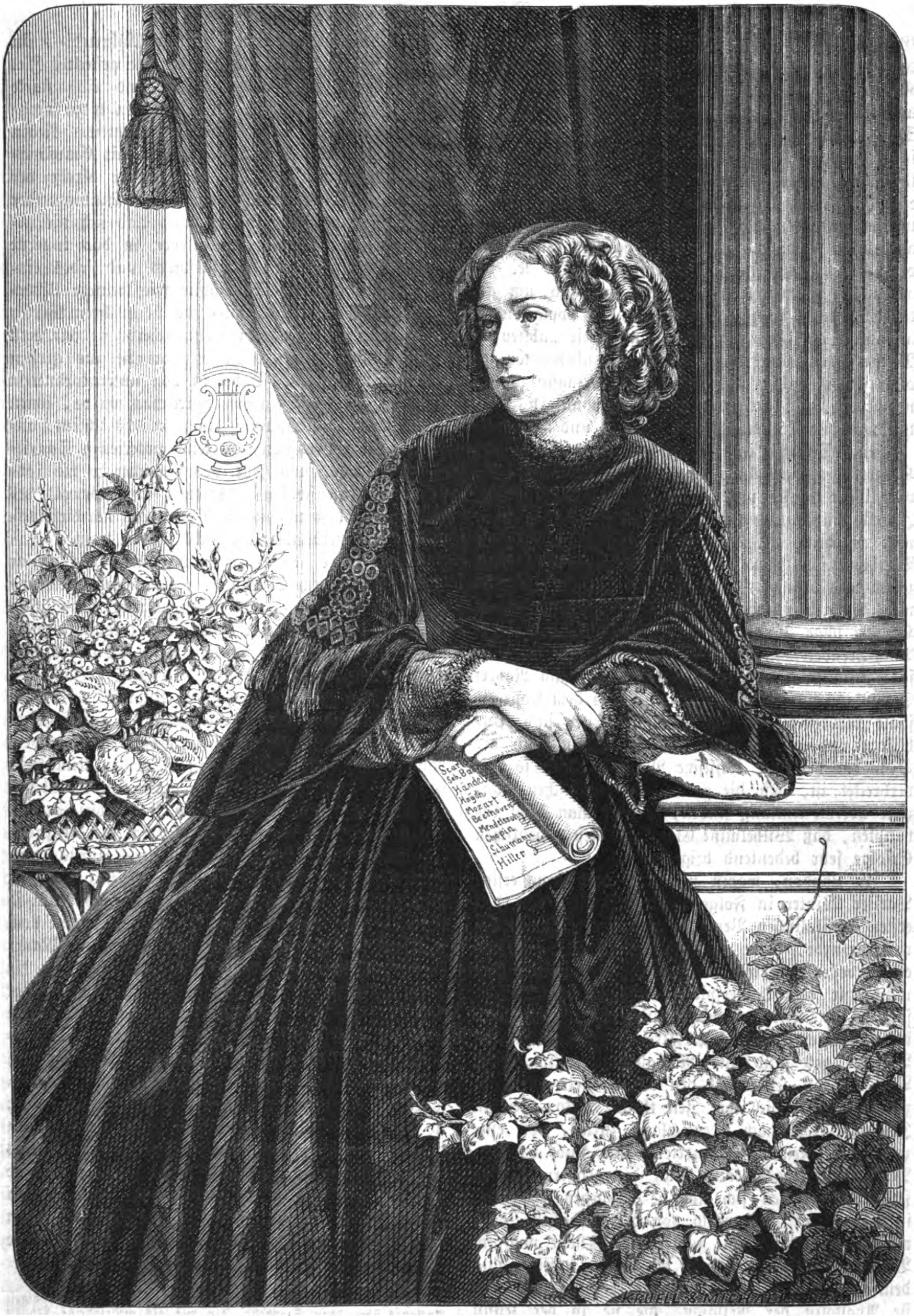
Wilhelmine Clauss-Szarvady (1867)
