= Robert Cauer the Younger =

German sculptor (1863–1947)

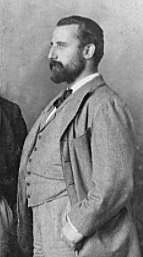
Robert Cauer (before 1900)

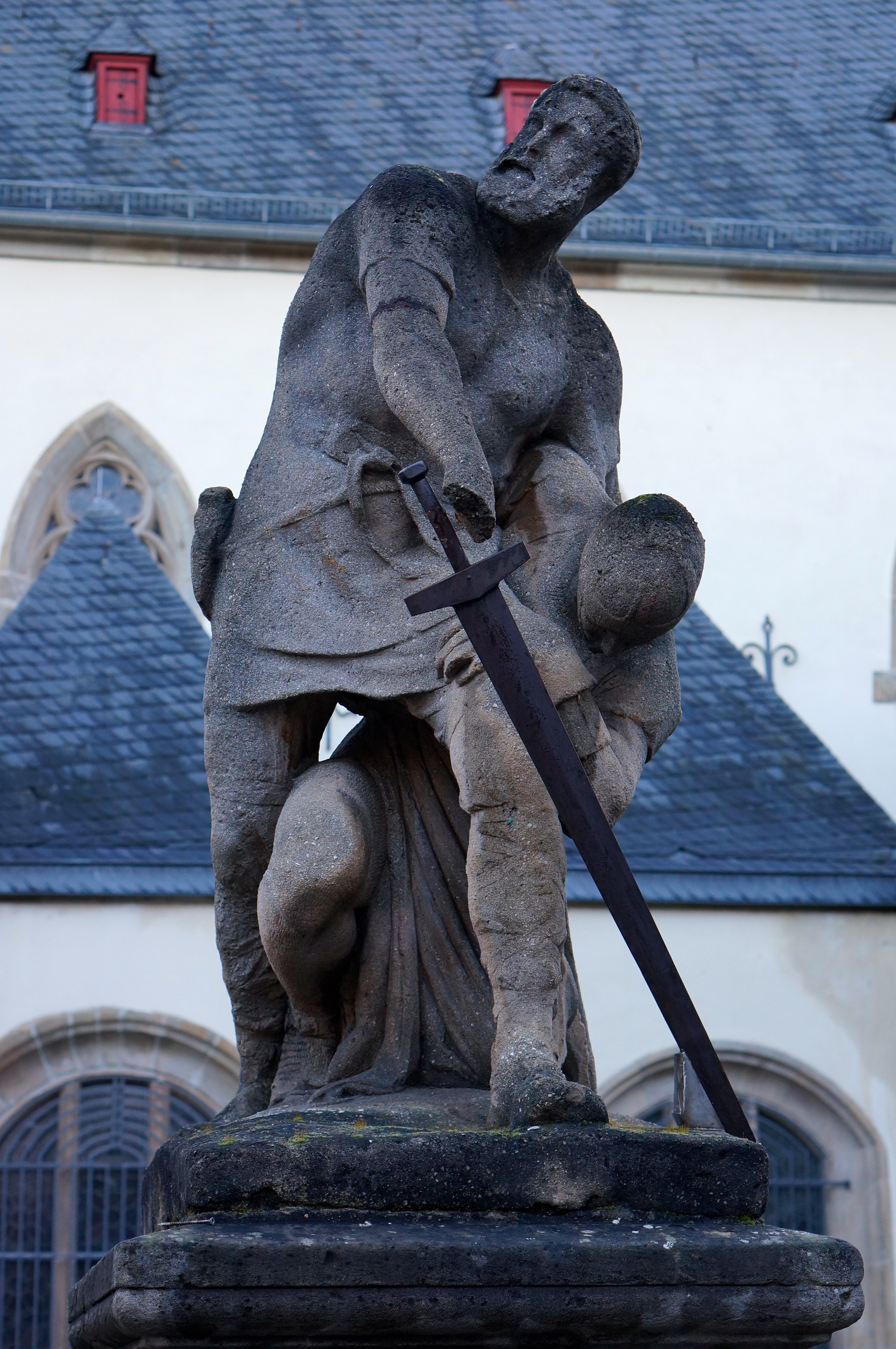
Michel Mort

Robert Cauer the Younger (3 January 1863 – 28 February 1947) was a German sculptor.

== Life and work ==
He was born in Bad Kreuznach to sculptor Karl Cauer, who gave him his first lessons. Three of his brothers, Emil, Ludwig and Hugo (1864–1918) also became sculptors. In 1880, he made an extended study trip to Rome. From 1887 to 1889, he worked at the Cauer family studios there. By 1889, he was in the United States, in St. Louis, where his family had professional connections. There, he created portrait busts.

He went back to Germany and, in 1902, was married. That same year, he created one of his largest works, the monument "Michel Mort und die Schlacht von Sprendlingen" (Michel Mort and the Battle of Sprendlingen) in Bad Kreuznach. After another stay in St. Louis in 1904, he settled in Darmstadt and worked as a freelance sculptor; producing busts and reliefs for public and private clients, many with religious or symbolic themes.

In 1916, he was awarded the title of Professor by Grand Duke Ernst Ludwig, and became an honorary citizen of Hesse the following year.

He died in Darmstadt in 1947. A street in the city is named after him.
