= Leisel =

- Municipality
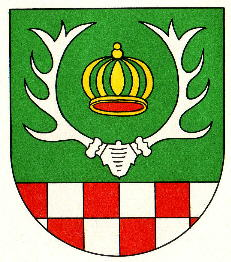
- Coat of arms

- Location of Leisel within Birkenfeld district
- Interactive map of Leisel
- Location within Germany Location within Rhineland-Palatinate
- Coordinates: 49°43′11″N 7°12′14″E
- Country: Germany
- State: Rhineland-Palatinate
- District: Birkenfeld
- Municipal assoc.: Birkenfeld

Government
  - Mayor (2019–24): Karlheinz Bittig

Area
  - Total: 8.82 km^{2} (3.41 sq mi)
- Elevation: 420 m (1,380 ft)

Population (2025-12-31)
  - Total: 531
  - Density: 60.2/km^{2} (156/sq mi)
- Time zone: UTC+01:00 (CET)
  - Summer (DST): UTC+02:00 (CEST)
- Postal codes: 55767
- Dialling codes: 06787
- Vehicle registration: BIR
- Website: www.leisel.net

Leisel (German pronunciation: [ˈlaɪzl̩]) is an Ortsgemeinde – a municipality belonging to a Verbandsgemeinde, a kind of collective municipality – in the Birkenfeld district in Rhineland-Palatinate, Germany. It belongs to the Verbandsgemeinde of Birkenfeld, whose seat is in the like-named town.

== Geography ==
=== Location ===
The municipality lies on the Leiselbach at the Idar Forest in the Hunsrück. The municipal area is 65% wooded.

=== Neighbouring municipalities ===
Leisel borders in the northeast on the municipality of Siesbach, in the southeast on the municipality of Wilzenberg-Hußweiler and in the southwest on the municipality of Schwollen.

== History ==
In 1180, Leisel had its first documentary mention as Lucei in a document dealing with legal relationships in the Archbishopric of Trier, under whose sovereignty Leisel lay at that time. In 1328, Archbishop of Trier Baldwin acknowledged the Sponheim lordship over the Birkenfelder Land (the country around Birkenfeld). The countercompony base (that is, with two rows of squares of alternating tinctures) in the municipality's coat of arms recalls this time, for the Counts of Sponheim bore arms that were chequy (completely covered with squares of alternating tinctures).

With regard to administration, Leisel belonged to the Pflege (literally “care”, but actually a local geopolitical unit) of Brombach. Together with other nearby places it formed a unified administrative region, both in ecclesiastical and secular matters. Together with the Pflege of Birkenfeld, this formed the Sponheim Amt of Birkenfeld, whose northeast border was for centuries the Siesbach.

The Amt administrators had their seat at Birkenfeld Castle, while the municipalities themselves were each led by a Reihe-Bürgermeister (Reihe means “row” or “series” in German), who changed every year. Standing above them, mostly for several villages each, was a Gerichtsschöffe (roughly “lay jurist”) appointed by the Amtmann.

In 1437, Lussel, as it was then known, found itself under a condominium, ruled by both the Margraves of Baden and Stephen, Count Palatine of Simmern-Zweibrücken of the House of Wittelsbach, who were the heirs to the Sponheims’ holdings once that noble house had died out. In 1776, the rulers of those two lines chose to divide their joint holdings between themselves, with Leussel (a.k.a. Leischer) passing to Baden.

Only twenty years later, though, the political landscape changed drastically with the French Revolutionary Wars. France annexed the Rhine’s left bank in 1797. In 1801, Leisel became the seat of a mairie (“mayoralty”), which persisted until 1840, well after the end of French rule. It comprised the villages of Siesbach, Leisel, Schwollen, Hattgenstein, Rinzenberg, Hambach, Böschweiler and Heupweiler. The political alignment changed once again with Napoleon's downfall and the Congress of Vienna, which grouped Leisel into the Grand Duchy of Oldenburg, or rather Oldenburg's local exclave, the Principality of Birkenfeld; most of Oldenburg's territory was in what is now northwest Germany, with a coastline on the North Sea. Oldenburg sovereignty is commemorated in the road name Peterstraße in the Leisel Forest. Grand Duke Peter had it built so that he did not have to travel through the Kingdom of Prussia, with whom he had ongoing border disputes, whenever he visited the Birkenfelder Land.

Oldenburg still existed as a state even through Imperial and Weimar times, but Nazi Germany finally put an end to it in 1937 on the basis of the Greater Hamburg Act; the Birkenfeld exclave, along with Leisel, as it was now called, was incorporated into Prussia's Rhine Province.

After the Second World War, Leisel became part of the then newly founded state of Rhineland-Palatinate. In 1980, it celebrated its 800th anniversary of first documentary mention.

== Politics ==
=== Municipal council ===
The council is made up of 12 council members, who were elected by majority vote at the municipal election held on 7 June 2009, and the honorary mayor as chairman.

=== Mayors ===
Leisel's mayor is Karlheinz Bittig. His predecessors since the Second World War have been:

- 1945-1969: Emil Hey
- 1969-1976: Walter Schüßler
- 1976-1988: Werner Jung
- 1988-2004: Karl-Heinz Bittig
- 2004-2009: Klaus Bohrer
- 2009–2019: Wolfgang Schüßler

=== Coat of arms ===
The German blazon reads: Über rot-silbern geschachtem Schildfuß in Grün ein silbernes Hirschgeweih mit Grind, darin eine goldene Krone.

The municipality's arms might in English heraldic language be described thus: Vert a stag's attires fixed to the scalp argent, between them a crown Or, in base countercompony gules and argent.

The countercompony base (that is, with two rows of squares of alternating tinctures) is a reference to the village's former allegiance to the “Hinder” County of Sponheim, Oberamt of Birkenfeld. The field tincture, vert (green) symbolizes agriculture and forestry. The main charge, the stag's attires (antlers), stands for the wealth of wildlife in the municipal woodlands. The crown recalls the one found over the door at the old Badisches Amtshaus.

The arms have been borne since 31 May 1965.

== Culture and sightseeing ==
=== Buildings ===
The following are listed buildings or sites in Rhineland-Palatinate’s Directory of Cultural Monuments:

- Hauptstraße 28 – so-called Badisches Amtshaus; scattered farmstead with house, barn with stable, piggery and henhouse as well as smaller house, possibly for servants; main house, partly timber-frame, partly slated, hipped mansard roof, marked 1767; characterizes village’s appearance
- Hauptstraße 30 – Quereinhaus (a combination residential and commercial house divided for these two purposes down the middle, perpendicularly to the street), partly timber-frame (plastered or slated), possibly from the earlier half of the 19th century; characterizes village’s appearance
- Hauptstraße 32 – stately Quereinhaus, partly timber-frame (plastered or slated), possibly from the earlier half of the 19th century
- Hauptstraße 44 – former Quereinhaus with gemstone grinding shop, essentially from the earlier half of the 19th century
- Hauptstraße 23, 25, 26, 27, 28, 30, 32, 34, Burbacher Straße 2, Hofstraße 4, village centre (monumental zone) – village centre of the clump village with school and rectory; distinguishing village streetscape with Quereinhäuser and scattered farmsteads, 18th and 19th centuries
- Heiligenbösch Evangelical Parish Church (Pfarrkirche Heiligenbösch), west of the village – west tower 13th century (?), nave 1730, built on top of bathing facilities of a villa rustica; décor
- Graveyard, west of the village, just east of Heiligenbösch Church (monumental zone) – laid out in 1838, expanded after 1945 as a Reformed graveyard; quarrystone wall; gravestones from 1857 onwards, cast-iron crosses (Asbach Ironworks?); monumental warriors’ memorial to those from Leisel, Schwollen and Hattgenstein who fell in the First World War, design by Hans Best, Kreuznach, execution by Mittler & Co., Obermendig

== Economy and infrastructure ==
=== Transport ===
To the northeast runs Bundesstraße 422. Serving nearby Kronweiler is a railway station on the Nahe Valley Railway (Bingen–Saarbrücken).

== Famous people ==
- Karl Heyl (1812–1893), Member of the Reichstag and Landtag, born in Leisel
