= Wilzenberg-Hußweiler =

- Municipality
- Coat of arms

- Location of Wilzenberg-Hußweiler within Birkenfeld district
- Interactive map of Wilzenberg-Hußweiler
- Location within Germany Location within Rhineland-Palatinate
- Coordinates: 49°42′12.100″N 7°13′23.12″E
- Country: Germany
- State: Rhineland-Palatinate
- District: Birkenfeld
- Municipal assoc.: Birkenfeld

Government
  - Mayor (2019–24): Joachim Jung

Area
  - Total: 6.46 km^{2} (2.49 sq mi)
- Elevation: 350 m (1,150 ft)

Population (2025-12-31)
  - Total: 297
  - Density: 46.0/km^{2} (119/sq mi)
- Time zone: UTC+01:00 (CET)
  - Summer (DST): UTC+02:00 (CEST)
- Postal codes: 55767
- Dialling codes: 06787
- Vehicle registration: BIR

Wilzenberg-Hußweiler (or Wilzenberg-Hussweiler) is an Ortsgemeinde – a municipality belonging to a Verbandsgemeinde, a kind of collective municipality – in the Birkenfeld district in Rhineland-Palatinate, Germany. It belongs to the Verbandsgemeinde of Birkenfeld, whose seat is in the like-named town.

== Geography ==
=== Location ===
This double municipality, consisting of the Ortsteile of Wilzenberg and Hußweiler, lies on the Schwollbach at the edge of the Schwarzwälder Hochwald (forest) in the Hunsrück. The municipal area is 52.6% wooded.

=== Neighbouring municipalities ===
Wilzenberg-Hußweiler borders in the north on the municipality of Siesbach, in the northeast on the municipality of Rötsweiler-Nockenthal, in the east on the municipality of Oberbrombach, in the south on the municipality of Niederbrombach, in the southwest on the municipality of Niederhambach, in the west on the municipality of Schwollen and in the northwest on the municipality of Leisel.

== History ==
In 1344, Hußweiler had its first documentary mention, while Wilzenberg was first mentioned in 1438. Both places belonged to the “Hinder” County of Sponheim. After the Congress of Vienna, both Hußweiler and Wilzenberg became part of the Principality of Birkenfeld, an exclave of the Grand Duchy of Oldenburg, most of whose territory was in what is now northwest Germany, with a coastline on the North Sea. In the course of administrative restructuring in Oldenburg under the Nazis, Wilzenberg and Hußweiler were amalgamated into one municipality on 22 September 1933.

== Politics ==
=== Municipal council ===
The council is made up of 8 council members, who were elected by majority vote at the municipal election held on 7 June 2009, and the honorary mayor as chairman.

=== Mayor ===
Wilzenberg-Hußweiler’s mayor is Joachim Jung.

=== Coat of arms ===
The municipality’s arms might be described thus: Per pale argent and vert an oaktree fructed eradicated counterchanged, the chief countercompony gules and argent.

== Culture and sightseeing ==
=== Buildings ===
The following are listed buildings or sites in Rhineland-Palatinate’s Directory of Cultural Monuments:

==== Hußweiler ====
- Hußweilerstraße 30 – stately Quereinhaus (a combination residential and commercial house divided for these two purposes down the middle, perpendicularly to the street), partly timber-frame, partly slated, half-hipped roof, marked 1822; in the back barn additions

==== Wilzenberg ====
- Auf der Dry 3 – former smithy; one-floor building with gable roof, possibly from the 20th century; technical equipment

== Economy and infrastructure ==
=== Transport ===
Running to the southeast of the municipality is Bundesstraße 41, which towards the south leads to the Autobahn A 62 (Kaiserslautern–Trier). Serving nearby Kronweiler is a railway station on the Nahe Valley Railway (Bingen–Saarbrücken).
