= Achtelsbach =

- Municipality
- Coat of arms

- Location of Achtelsbach within Birkenfeld district
- Interactive map of Achtelsbach
- Location within Germany Location within Rhineland-Palatinate
- Coordinates: 49°37′32″N 07°05′27″E
- Country: Germany
- State: Rhineland-Palatinate
- District: Birkenfeld
- Municipal assoc.: Birkenfeld

Government
  - Mayor (2019–24): Kai Sohns

Area
  - Total: 9.70 km^{2} (3.75 sq mi)
- Elevation: 403 m (1,322 ft)

Population (2025-12-31)
  - Total: 379
  - Density: 39.1/km^{2} (101/sq mi)
- Time zone: UTC+01:00 (CET)
  - Summer (DST): UTC+02:00 (CEST)
- Postal codes: 55767
- Dialling codes: 06782
- Vehicle registration: BIR

Achtelsbach is an Ortsgemeinde – a municipality belonging to a Verbandsgemeinde, a kind of collective municipality – in the Birkenfeld district in Rhineland-Palatinate, Germany. It belongs to the Verbandsgemeinde of Birkenfeld, whose seat is in the like-named town.

== Geography ==
=== Location ===
The municipality lies on the Traunbach, at the foot of the Schwarzwälder Hochwald (High Black Forest) in the Hunsrück. Both north and south of the village lie wooded mountains of 500 and 525 m above sea level respectively. Just west of the village runs the state boundary with the Saarland. Achtelsbach lies some 6 km west of the district seat of Birkenfeld. Idar-Oberstein lies 22 km to the northeast, while Sankt Wendel lies roughly 25 km to Achtelsbach's south.

=== Neighbouring municipalities ===
Achtelsbach's neighbours are Brücken, Traunen (an outlying centre of Brücken), Meckenbach and Eisen. The last named place is part of the municipality of Nohfelden in the Saarland's Sankt Wendel district.

=== Constituent communities ===
Also belonging to Achtelsbach is the homestead of Forsthaus Neuhof.

== History ==
In 1256, Achtelsbach had its first documentary mention as Achtelsbach. Soon afterwards, in the decades that followed, the village managed to become a hub among the neighbouring villages, and in 1315 it became the seat of a Pflege (literally “care”, but actually a local geopolitical unit), which, besides Achtelsbach, also administered the neighbouring villages of Meckenbach and Traunen. This Pflege was a subfief from the Electorate of Trier whose immediate lords were the Vögte of Hunolstein. In 1480, this arrangement ended when Louis I, Count Palatine of Zweibrücken, sent his own Schultheiß out to Achtelsbach. The territory of the Pflege was expanded to encompass first Ellweiler, and beginning in the late 18th century also Eisen and Eckelshausen. In the course of the French takeover of the Rhineland in the French Revolutionary Wars, Achtelsbach became the seat of a mairie (“mayoralty”), which lasted even after the Congress of Vienna (1814-1815) as an Oldenburg Bürgermeisterei (also “mayoralty”) until 1876.

The parish of Achtelsbach was originally coëxtensive with the Pflege, until Brücken and Abentheuer were added to it. It lost influence after the Reformation and was ceded to Birkenfeld and Sötern (today an outlying centre of Nohfelden). It is known that there was a parish priest at the Achtelsbach church, which was consecrated to Saint Ulrich, as of 1334, although the church's beginnings stretch back further. The church itself, which has been Evangelical since the 16th century, is, with its churchtower that defines the village's skyline, Achtelsbach's most prominent building. On 9 January 2010, the belltower, and indeed the whole church, were heavily damaged in a fire.

== Politics ==
=== Municipal council ===
The council is made up of 8 council members, who were elected by majority vote at the municipal election held on 7 June 2009, and the honorary mayor as chairman.

=== Mayor ===
Achtelsbach's mayor is Kai Sohns.

=== Coat of arms ===
The German blazon reads: In geteiltem Schild oben in Silber eine rote, sechsblättrige Rose mit goldenen Butzen, unten ein wachsender, rotgekrönter, -bewehrter und -gezungter goldener Löwe in Schwarz.

The municipality's arms might in English heraldic language be described thus: Per fess argent a rose foiled of six gules barbed proper and seeded Or, and sable issuant from base a lion rampant of the third armed, langued and crowned of the second.

The German blazon says nothing about the rose's “barbs” (sepals).

The rose in the escutcheon’s upper field refers to the Evangelical church in the village, which, with its enormous tower, dominates the skyline. The charge in the field below this is a reference to the village’s former allegiance to the Dukes of Palatinate-Zweibrücken. Moreover, the village’s old court seal also showed a lion.

The arms have been borne since 5 July 1965, when they were approved by the Rhineland-Palatinate Ministry of the Interior.

== Culture and sightseeing ==
=== Buildings ===
The following are listed buildings or sites in Rhineland-Palatinate’s Directory of Cultural Monuments:

- Evangelical church, Hohlstraße 1 – formerly Saint Ulrich’s Parish Church (Pfarrkirche St. Ulrich), aisleless church, essentially mediaeval, Baroque conversion 1738; in the tower a tomb slab, 1738
- Hauptstraße 24 – Quereinhaus (a combination residential and commercial house divided for these two purposes down the middle, perpendicularly to the street), marked 1857, timber-frame barn
- Hauptstraße 47 – Quereinhaus, stately Quereinhaus, mid-19th century; conversion possibly about 1900, bakehouse addition
- Hauptstraße (beneath the Evangelical church) – warriors’ memorial; 1920s, design by Johann Wettgen, Hermeskeil
- Former Forsthaus Neuhof (forester's house), Neuhof 1 – dwelling and work building, partly timber-frame (largely slated), 1855, commercial building

== Economy and infrastructure ==
=== Transport ===
Achtelsbach has no railway link. The nearest railway station lies seven kilometres to the southeast at Neubrücke on the Nahe Valley Railway. There are road links to Birkenfeld, to Nonnweiler in the Saarland and to Hermeskeil beyond the High Forest. The Autobahn A 62 (Kaiserslautern–Trier) runs by Achtelsbach roughly five kilometres to the south; interchanges are to be found in Neubrücke and Nohfelden-Türkismühle. Bundesstraßen 41 and 269 lead from Birkenfeld to Neubrücke a few kilometres east of Achtelsbach.

=== Scouting Hall ===
Achtelsbach is home to the state hall of the Idar-Oberstein Bund der Pfadfinderinnen und Pfadfinder (Guides and Scouts). In the 1970s, this former farmhouse was bought up by the boyscouts and renovated. Ever since, it has been let out to many clubs from throughout Germany, who use it regularly. Each year, several thousand visitors spend the night in the house or on the meadow next to it. Also, there is an open-house day in the autumn on which the scouting hall (Pfadfinderheim) presents itself.
