= Rinzenberg =

- Municipality
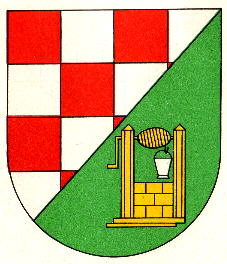
- Coat of arms

- Location of Rinzenberg within Birkenfeld district
- Interactive map of Rinzenberg
- Location within Germany Location within Rhineland-Palatinate
- Coordinates: 49°40′38″N 7°7′56″E
- Country: Germany
- State: Rhineland-Palatinate
- District: Birkenfeld
- Municipal assoc.: Birkenfeld

Government
  - Mayor (2019–24): Sven Becker

Area
  - Total: 11.33 km^{2} (4.37 sq mi)
- Elevation: 535 m (1,755 ft)

Population (2025-12-31)
  - Total: 322
  - Density: 28.4/km^{2} (73.6/sq mi)
- Time zone: UTC+01:00 (CET)
  - Summer (DST): UTC+02:00 (CEST)
- Postal codes: 55767
- Dialling codes: 06782
- Vehicle registration: BIR
- Website: www.rinzenberg.de

Rinzenberg is an Ortsgemeinde – a municipality belonging to a Verbandsgemeinde, a kind of collective municipality – in the Birkenfeld district in Rhineland-Palatinate, Germany. It belongs to the Verbandsgemeinde of Birkenfeld, whose seat is in the like-named town.

== Geography ==
=== Location ===
The municipality lies at the southern edge of the Schwarzwälder Hochwald, a self-contained forest within the Hunsrück. The municipal area measures 1 133 ha, of which somewhat more than half is state forest, and indeed 76.5% of it is wooded. The area makes Rinzenberg the district's seventh biggest municipality by land area. Only the three towns (Birkenfeld, Idar-Oberstein and Baumholder) and the municipalities of Allenbach, Hoppstädten-Weiersbach and Brücken have larger municipal areas. Rinzenberg's elevation is roughly 532 m above sea level, and above the village looms the 668 m-high “Wehlenstein”.

=== Neighbouring municipalities ===
Rinzenberg borders in the northeast on the municipality of Oberhambach, in the east on the municipality of Gollenberg and in the south on the municipalities of Ellenberg and Buhlenberg.

== History ==
In 1269, Rinzenberg probably had its first documentary mention as Ritzeberg, and thereafter belonged to those villages that were bought back by the Counts of Sponheim after they had enfeoffed Wilhelm von Schwarzenberg with them.

Rinzenberg had its heyday in the 16th century when the village profited from business earned by the Hambacher Sauerbrunnen – a mineral spring from which flowed acidic water – which allowed the village to become a spa. The wealth in Rinzenberg manifested itself in stately stone buildings. In the war-wracked times of the 17th century, few people travelled to Rinzenberg for its waters, and the village's star faded.

Sponheim rule came to an end with the French Revolutionary Wars. Beginning then, Rinzenberg lay under French rule.

After the Wehrmacht was defeated and the Third Reich fell as the Second World War drew to an end in 1945, Rinzenberg had to share the burden of the war's consequences. A whole army of French forestry workers – for Rinzenberg was in the French zone of occupation – descended on the Schwarzwälder Hochwald and built a sawmill, and whole forest districts were then clearcut. This went on for years. According to precise plans, usable, high-quality stands of trees were felled, sawn and shipped to France for reconstruction efforts. The formerly gentle contours of the Schwarzwälder Hochwald became cleft-filled and jagged against the sky in the background.

Since 1946, Rinzenberg has been part of the then newly founded state of Rhineland-Palatinate.

== Politics ==
=== Municipal council ===
The council is made up of 8 council members, who were elected by majority vote at the municipal election held on 7 June 2009, and the honorary mayor as chairman.

=== Mayor ===
Rinzenberg's mayor is Sven Becker, and his deputies are Siegfried Blunz and Brunhilde Gordner.

=== Coat of arms ===
The German blazon reads: In schräglinks geteiltem Schild vorne rot-silbern geschacht, hinten in Grün ein goldener Ziehbrunnen mit silbernem Eimer.

The municipality's arms might in English heraldic language be described thus: Per bend sinister chequy gules and argent and vert a well Or with a pail of the second.

The “chequy” field on the dexter (armsbearer's right, viewer's left) side is a reference to the village's former allegiance to the “Hinder” County of Sponheim, Oberamt of Birkenfeld, while the charge on the sinister (armsbearer's left, viewer's right) side, the well, stands for the Legend of Old Rinzenberg (see below).

The arms have been borne since 1964.

== Culture and sightseeing ==
=== Buildings ===
The following are listed buildings or sites in Rhineland-Palatinate’s Directory of Cultural Monuments:

- Before Am Brunnen 4 – cast-iron Gothic Revival fountain (Asbach Ironworks?), 1886
- Across from Buchenweg 6 – cast-iron Gothic Revival fountain (Asbach Ironworks?), 1886
- Hauptstraße 9 – Quereinhaus (a combination residential and commercial house divided for these two purposes down the middle, perpendicularly to the street), essentially from the late 16th century, marked 1590 (spolia?) and 1825
- Hauptstraße 11 – former Quereinhaus, partly timber-frame, oven addition, possibly from the earlier half of the 19th century
- Beside Kirchenweg 2 – cast-iron Gothic Revival fountain (Asbach Ironworks?), 1886

=== The Legend of Old Rinzenberg ===
The Legend of Old Rinzenberg (die Sage von Altrinzenberg) is a story about a man from the village:

There once was a man in Old Rinzenberg whose worries over his daily bread weighed heavily upon him. Despite honest, hard work, things only ever got worse for him, and it became ever harder to keep himself and his loved ones fed. One night, he had an odd dream: at his bed stood a man who said “You go to too much toil and trouble! To Koblenz with you, onto the bridge. There you will find your luck.” The dream recurred, and after the third time, he told his wife about it. She thought it would do no harm to go there once and have a look. So, the man set off from the Hochwald to the Rhine, hardly bothering to stop for food or sleep along the way, for he did not want to miss out on his luck.

When he arrived in Koblenz, he went straight to the old bridge on the Moselle to seek his luck. He left no stone unturned, he looked in every crack of the bridge’s old stonework, but nowhere could he find any luck. For three long days he sought his luck on the bridge, but in vain. He became annoyed with himself and called out “What an ass I am, believing in dreams! May the devil take the Koblenz Bridge together with its luck!”

Then, a rather serious-looking man came up to him. Giving him a puzzled look in the face, he said, “You may well not be very bright to believe so in dreams. How on earth can one seek luck on the Koblenz Bridge? If I were as simple as you, I would long ago have sought out the little nest of Rinzenberg, which I have seen three times in dreams.”

At this, the Hochwald man pricked up his ears, and, curious, he asked, “What is this about Rinzenberg?”

“Ah,” began the Moselle man, “there, deep in the village well has lain for centuries a chest full of gold, supposedly. What one can make of such dreamt-up treasures, though, you now ought to see quite clearly for yourself!”

No sooner had the Rinzenberg man heard this than he sped off like lightning. As quickly as he could, he hurried up the Rhine and the Nahe to his little Hochwald village. Then, at night, when the world was asleep, he climbed into the village well and there found an iron chest full of gold, which he fetched out. Thus, he had found his luck on the bridge at Koblenz.

This story has even found its way into the municipality's coat of arms, which shows a golden well, meant to represent the one in the story.

== Economy and infrastructure ==
=== Transport ===
Running east of the municipality is Bundesstraße 269, which to the south leads to the Autobahn A 62 (Kaiserslautern–Trier). Serving nearby Neubrücke is a railway station on the Nahe Valley Railway (Bingen–Saarbrücken).

=== Economy ===
Rinzenberg's 300 or so inhabitants no longer earn their livelihoods mainly from agriculture and forestry, which once characterized the local economy. Both these former mainstays have seen their importance dwindle as they have become mechanized. Most working people commute to jobs in the local area, with the district seat of Birkenfeld, only five kilometres away, being a particularly common destination.
