= Siesbach =

- Municipality
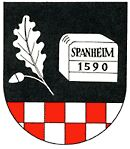
- Coat of arms

- Location of Siesbach within Birkenfeld district
- Interactive map of Siesbach
- Location within Germany Location within Rhineland-Palatinate
- Coordinates: 49°43′58″N 7°14′20″E
- Country: Germany
- State: Rhineland-Palatinate
- District: Birkenfeld
- Municipal assoc.: Birkenfeld

Government
  - Mayor (2019–24): Klaus Mildenberger

Area
  - Total: 7.43 km^{2} (2.87 sq mi)
- Elevation: 388 m (1,273 ft)

Population (2025-12-31)
  - Total: 349
  - Density: 47.0/km^{2} (122/sq mi)
- Time zone: UTC+01:00 (CET)
  - Summer (DST): UTC+02:00 (CEST)
- Postal codes: 55767
- Dialling codes: 06781
- Vehicle registration: BIR

Siesbach is an Ortsgemeinde – a municipality belonging to a Verbandsgemeinde, a kind of collective municipality – in the Birkenfeld district in Rhineland-Palatinate, Germany. It belongs to the Verbandsgemeinde of Birkenfeld, whose seat is in the like-named town.

== Geography ==
=== Location ===
Siesbach lies in the Naturpark Saar-Hunsrück. The municipal area is 68.3% wooded. The nearest major town is Idar-Oberstein, 3 km to the southeast.

=== Neighbouring municipalities ===
Siesbach borders in the north on the municipality of Sensweiler, in the northeast on the municipality of Hettenrodt, in the east on the municipality of Mackenrodt, in the southeast on the municipality of Rötsweiler-Nockenthal, in the south and southwest on the municipality of Wilzenberg-Hußweiler, in the west on the municipality of Schwollen and in the northwest on the municipality of Allenbach.

== Politics ==
=== Municipal council ===
The council is made up of 8 council members, who were elected by majority vote at the municipal election held on 7 June 2009, and the honorary mayor as chairman.

=== Mayor ===
Siesbach's mayor is Klaus Mildenberger.

=== Coat of arms ===
The German blazon reads: Über rot-silbern geschachtem Schildfuß in Schwarz vorne ein silbernes Eichblatt mit Eichel, hinten ein silberner beschrifteter Stein.

The municipality's arms might in English heraldic language be described thus: Sable dexter an oakleaf per bend fructed of one and sinister a border stone inscribed of the field, both argent, the base countercompony gules and argent.

The charge on the dexter (armsbearer's right, viewer's left) side, the oakleaf and the acorn, stand for the municipality's wealth of woodland, while the one on the sinister (armsbearer's left, viewer's right) side, the border stone, recalls such an object within municipal limits that is under monumental protection. The countercompony (that is, with two chequered rows) base is a reference to the village's former allegiance to the “Hinder” County of Sponheim, Oberamt of Birkenfeld.

The arms have been borne since 15 December 1964.

== Culture and sightseeing ==
=== Buildings ===
The following are listed buildings or sites in Rhineland-Palatinate’s Directory of Cultural Monuments:

- Evangelical church, Kirchweg – formerly Saint Nicholas’s (St. Nikolaus), aisleless church, 1825, essentially possibly earlier than the 16th century; east of the church a pyramidal warriors’ memorial, 1925, expanded after 1945
- Across from Hauptstraße 3 – border stone, 1590
- Near Hauptstraße 7 – Gothic Revival cast-iron running well, last fourth of the 19th century
- Near Hauptstraße 44 – electric gemcutting mill; brick building with great iron-lattice windows, about 1900; technical equipment
- Near Hauptstraße 48 – former gemcutting mill; timber-frame building with great iron-lattice windows, marked 1910

=== Prehistory ===
Siesbach is also home to a Gallo-Roman barrow in the “Kipp” forest district.

== Economy and infrastructure ==
=== Transport ===
Running to the northeast of the municipality is Bundesstraße 422. In nearby Idar-Oberstein, the railway station, as a Regional-Express and Regionalbahn stop, is linked by way of the Nahe Valley Railway (Bingen–Saarbrücken) to the Saarland and the Frankfurt Rhine Main Region. The Rhein-Nahe-Express running the Mainz-Saarbrücken route serves the station hourly. Every other train goes through to the main railway station in Frankfurt with a stop at Frankfurt Airport. Formerly, fast trains on the Frankfurt-Paris route had a stop at Idar-Oberstein.
