= Abentheuer =

- Municipality
- Coat of arms

- Location of Abentheuer within Birkenfeld district
- Interactive map of Abentheuer
- Location within Germany Location within Rhineland-Palatinate
- Coordinates: 49°38′59″N 07°06′14″E
- Country: Germany
- State: Rhineland-Palatinate
- District: Birkenfeld
- Municipal assoc.: Birkenfeld

Government
  - Mayor (2019–24): Andrea Thiel

Area
  - Total: 6.12 km^{2} (2.36 sq mi)
- Elevation: 421 m (1,381 ft)

Population (2025-12-31)
  - Total: 425
  - Density: 69.4/km^{2} (180/sq mi)
- Time zone: UTC+01:00 (CET)
  - Summer (DST): UTC+02:00 (CEST)
- Postal codes: 55767
- Dialling codes: 06782
- Vehicle registration: BIR

Abentheuer is an Ortsgemeinde – a municipality belonging to a Verbandsgemeinde, a kind of collective municipality – in the Birkenfeld district in Rhineland-Palatinate, Germany. It belongs to the Verbandsgemeinde of Birkenfeld, whose seat is in the like-named town.

== Geography ==
=== Location ===
The municipality lies on the Traunbach in the Schwarzwälder Hochwald (forest) in the Hunsrück. Beginning on the village's outskirts is the Trauntalschleife, the award-winning hiking trail of the Saar-Hunsrück-Steig, a 180-kilometre (110 mi) long system of trails. The municipal area is 71.5 percent wooded.

=== Neighbouring municipalities ===
Abentheuer borders in the north on Börfink, in the east on Buhlenberg and in the south on Brücken.

=== Constituent communities ===
Two outlying homesteads also belong to Abentheuer: Arthenberg and Hujetsägemühle.

== History ==
Abentheuer grew together in the early 20th century out of the two formerly separate centres of Leyen and Abentheuer, the latter also known as Abentheuerhütte. Leyen, which lay in the southeast of today's municipality, on the Traunbach, had its first documentary mention in 1367, whereas Abentheuer, to the north, is first witnessed in records in 1580. Until the 18th century, each centre still bore its own name. Today's municipal area was held by the County of Sponheim. The Traunbach then served as the border between the Hunolstein (and beginning in 1598, Palatinate-Zweibrücken) Amt of Achtelsbach to the west and the Sponheim Amt of Birkenfeld to the east. Over the course of its history, Abentheuer belonged either to the parish of Achtelsbach or to the parish of Birkenfeld; today it belongs to the parish of Brücken.

Beginning in the mid-16th century, the working of iron began, first from the pits in Buhlenberg and Elchweiler, then later from Thalfang and Schwarzenbach. In 1763, owing to economic hardship, the Abentheuer Ironworks (Abentheuerer Hütte) passed into the ownership of the Stumm entrepreneurial family, which already had other ironworks and hammermills in the region at its disposal. After this change in ownership, production in Abentheuer rose noticeably. From 1770, the plant's products were first and foremost cast-iron articles made from imported pig iron. In 1835, the ironworks were bequeathed to the Böcking brothers, who shut the works down in 1875 and moved them to the coal deposits and better shipping links on the Saar.

In the late 17th century, the Hujetssägemühle (Sägemühle means “sawmill” in German) set up shop east of the village in the wooded valley of the Traun. By the late 19th century, it had developed into a furniture factory with several production buildings. These were abandoned in the 1960s. Also forsaken was the inn that had arisen from the sawmill.

== Politics ==
=== Municipal council ===
The council is made up of eight council members, who were elected by majority vote at the municipal election held on 7 June 2009, and the honorary mayor as chairman.

=== Mayors ===
Listed here are the municipality's mayors since 1857:

1. Gustav Adolf Böcking (11 June 1857 – 31 October 1891)
2. von Hammerstein (25 April 1892 – 21 April 1914)
3. Wilhelm Antes (29 September 1914 – 13 August 1919)
4. Karl Mersch (13 August 1919 – 10 January 1923)
5. Kurt Böcking (25 February 1923 – 23 October 1964; during his wartime service from 25 April 1940 to 19 March 1945, he was represented by Karl Mersch)
6. Richard Spreier (4 December 1964 – 10 June 1972)
7. Günther Jörg (17 June 1972 – 17 August 1999)
8. Klaus Goldt (17 August 1999 – 2019)
9. Andrea Thiel (2019–present)

=== Coat of arms ===
The municipality's arms might be described thus: Above a base countercompony gules and argent vert a crucible of the second flanked by two ears of wheat slipped per chevron Or.

The municipal arms were approved by the Rhineland-Palatinate Ministry of the Interior in 1965.

== Culture and sightseeing ==
=== Buildings ===
The following are listed buildings or sites in Rhineland-Palatinate’s Directory of Cultural Monuments:

- Böckingstraße 11 – country house on an irregular floor plan, partly wood-shingled brick timber framing, about 1900
- Mühlenberg 1, 3, 3a, 5, Abentheuer Ironworks (Abentheuerer Hütte; monumental zone) – plot ringed with a quarrystone wall and buildings of former iron ore smelter: no. 1 former small-stock warehouse (1771); no. 3 manor house; building with mansard roof, side risalto (last third of the 18th century); no. 3a administration building and inn; stable and shed (from 1772 on); no. 5 dwelling and production building; remnants of the iron overshot waterwheel (latter half of the 19th century), cast-iron bridge (about 1800), remnants of the blast furnace (early 19th century), course of the Traunbach, pond, landscaped garden
- Mühlenbergstraße 4 – building with half-hipped roof, partly timber-frame, early 19th century
- Mühlenbergstraße 20 – one-floor building with hipped mansard roof, about 1800, timber-frame barn; characterizes village's appearance

== Economy and infrastructure ==
=== Transport ===
To the east runs Bundesstraße 41, and to the south, the Autobahn A 62. Serving nearby Neubrücke is a railway station on the Nahe Valley Railway.

== Famous people ==
=== Sons and daughters of the town ===
- Otto Braß (1887–1945), Member of the Reichstag
- Klaus Rüter (1940– ), former Secretary of State of the Rhineland-Palatinate state government.
