= Gollenberg, Rhineland-Palatinate =

Gollenberg
- Municipality
- Coat of arms

- Location of Gollenberg within Birkenfeld district
- Interactive map of Gollenberg
- Location within Germany Location within Rhineland-Palatinate
- Coordinates: 49°40′23″N 7°09′33″E
- Country: Germany
- State: Rhineland-Palatinate
- District: Birkenfeld
- Municipal assoc.: Birkenfeld

Government
  - Mayor (2019–24): Ralf Simon

Area
  - Total: 3.25 km^{2} (1.25 sq mi)
- Elevation: 512 m (1,680 ft)

Population (2025-12-31)
  - Total: 116
  - Density: 35.7/km^{2} (92.4/sq mi)
- Time zone: UTC+01:00 (CET)
  - Summer (DST): UTC+02:00 (CEST)
- Postal codes: 55767
- Dialling codes: 06782
- Vehicle registration: BIR
- Website: www.gollenberg.de

Gollenberg (German pronunciation: [ˈɡɔlənbɛʁk]) is an Ortsgemeinde – a municipality belonging to a Verbandsgemeinde, a kind of collective municipality – in the Birkenfeld district in Rhineland-Palatinate, Germany. It belongs to the Verbandsgemeinde of Birkenfeld, whose seat is in the like-named town.

== Geography ==
=== Location ===
The municipality lies on the edge of the Schwarzwälder Hochwald (forest) in the Hunsrück.

=== Neighbouring municipalities ===
Gollenberg borders in the south on Birkenfeld, and Ellenberg, in the west on Rinzenberg and in the north on Oberhambach.

== History ==
In 1415, Gollenberg had its first documentary mention under the name Gulderberg. By 1440 this had become Golderberg, by 1540 Guldenberg. By 1580, this had become the form still used today, Gollenberg. The village belonged to the "Hinder" County of Sponheim.

Gollenberg's history is tightly bound with Birkenfeld's. That town's church books and official records contain many references to Gollenberg. The years 1642, 1650 and 1686 brought the villagers disaster. The hardship during the 17th century can perhaps be best seen in the sharp drop in the number of households in Gollenberg. In 1615 there were 19 of these, but by 1655, this had fallen to 5. It is likely that it was at this time that the village of Höhweiler, which once lay within what are now Gollenberg's limits, vanished.

Gollenberg is among the villages whose municipal areas were carved out of what was once Birkenfeld's municipal area. It is known that there were boundary disputes in 1766 with Rinzenberg, Schwollen and Hambach, and in 1770 with Birkenfeld and Schmißberg as well, suggesting that municipal separation from Birkenfeld was complete by this time.

In 1815, the Congress of Vienna assigned the Birkenfelder Land to the Grand Duke of Oldenburg, who took charge of his new holding on 16 April 1817, naming it the Principality of Birkenfeld. On 1 April 1937, under the Greater Hamburg Act, the old principality was absorbed into Prussia, which was still a distinct entity during the Third Reich. Since 1946, it has been part of the then newly founded state of Rhineland-Palatinate.

On 17 March 1945, Gollenberg once again suffered. Anti-aircraft batteries ("Flak") left over from an otherwise destroyed regiment set themselves up around Gollenberg. Along with them came a mortar detachment and many small-calibre anti-aircraft weapons. Advance detachments of infantry and military engineers arrived as well. Gollenberg soon resembled an army camp.

Towards 16:00, when artillery bombardment began on the municipal woodlands, in which the detachments and all vehicles were located, as was a supply depot that had not yet been emptied, it was decided to shift the combat vehicles to a new position in another wood, the Schönenwald.

Well into the afternoon, the weather thwarted any Allied air attacks, but when the clouds broke up, Allied fliers were already there. The combat vehicle drivers who already found themselves in the village, simply drove up to the houses to take cover. This resulted in a 20-minute-long fighter-bomber attack in which eight Allied aircraft dived at their targets, both dropping bombs and firing their on-board weapons. All too many times, they hit the village's houses instead, and it was not long before flames were leaping up from them. Jerrycans and munitions were also exploding, aggravating the already dangerous situation. By nightfall, five properties lay in rubble and ashes. At two properties, the commercial building burnt down, and two sheds fell victim to the flames. Luckily, there were no deaths. At four properties, the fires were put out in time. Even the livestock was saved.

On 22 May 1952, the double municipality of Gollenberg-Ellenberg, which had been in existence since 1 April 1934 was dissolved, and the two separate municipalities of Ellenberg and Gollenberg were reconstituted.

== Politics ==
=== Municipal council ===
The council is made up of 6 council members, who were elected by majority vote at the municipal election held on 7 June 2009, and the honorary mayor as chairman.

=== Mayor ===
Gollenberg’s mayor is Ralf Simon, and his deputies are Holger Sander and Karin Fetzer Fuchs.

=== Coat of arms ===
The German blazon reads: In schräglinks geteiltem Schild vorne rot-silbern geschacht, hinten ein goldener Dreiberg in Grün.

The municipality's arms might in English heraldic language be described thus: Per bend sinister chequy gules and argent, and vert issuant from base a mount of three Or.

The "chequy" pattern on the dexter (armsbearer's right, viewer's left) side is a reference to the village's former allegiance to the "Hinder" County of Sponheim, while the gold "mount of three" (hill with three knolls) on the sinister (armsbearer's left, viewer's right) side – a charge known in German heraldry as a Dreiberg – is a canting charge referring to the municipality's name in its former forms of Goldenberg ("Golden Mountain") and the like.

The arms have been borne since 27 June 1963.

== Economy and infrastructure ==
=== Transport ===
To the west runs Bundesstraße 269 and to the south the Autobahn A 62 (Kaiserslautern–Trier). Gollenberg is linked to the railway network by the station at Neubrücke, an outlying centre of Hoppstädten-Weiersbach. This station, on the Nahe Valley Railway (Bingen–Saarbrücken), is 45 minutes from Saarbrücken and less than two hours from Frankfurt.

== Famous people ==
- Otto Dreyer (1903–1986), politician (NSDAP)
