= Mackenrodt =

- Municipality
- Coat of arms

- Location of Mackenrodt within Birkenfeld district
- Interactive map of Mackenrodt
- Location within Germany Location within Rhineland-Palatinate
- Coordinates: 49°43′38″N 07°15′19″E
- Country: Germany
- State: Rhineland-Palatinate
- District: Birkenfeld
- Municipal assoc.: Herrstein-Rhaunen

Government
  - Mayor (2019–24): Reiner Mildenberger

Area
  - Total: 4.90 km^{2} (1.89 sq mi)
- Elevation: 440 m (1,440 ft)

Population (2025-12-31)
  - Total: 337
  - Density: 68.8/km^{2} (178/sq mi)
- Time zone: UTC+01:00 (CET)
  - Summer (DST): UTC+02:00 (CEST)
- Postal codes: 55758
- Dialling codes: 06781
- Vehicle registration: BIR
- Website: www.mackenrodt.de

Mackenrodt is an Ortsgemeinde – a municipality belonging to a Verbandsgemeinde, a kind of collective municipality – in the Birkenfeld district in Rhineland-Palatinate, Germany. It belongs to the Verbandsgemeinde Herrstein-Rhaunen, whose seat is in Herrstein.

== Geography ==
The municipality lies west of the river Nahe in the Hunsrück. The municipal area is 64.6% wooded. To the southeast lies the town of Idar-Oberstein.

== History ==
Mackenrodt has not always been the smallest municipality between the Idarbach and the Siesbach. In the 17th and 18th centuries, the village had more inhabitants than, for instance, Hettenrodt or Kirschweiler.

Unearthed within Mackenrodt's limits have been a few archaeological finds from Treverian (the Treveri were a people of mixed Celtic and Germanic stock, from whom the Latin name for the city of Trier, Augusta Treverorum, is also derived) and Roman times. However, this does not mean that today's village is as much as 2,000 years old. Beginning about AD 500, the old settlements in the area were forsaken owing to the throngs of warlike Germanic peoples who were flooding in from the east. Only relatively late did people – as it happens, the Franks – once again settle on the upper Nahe. Before anyone could settle, though, land had to be cleared. This can even be seen in placenames like Mackenrodt, Hettenrodt and Algenrodt. The ending —rodt refers to clearing woodland (German still has a verb roden that means “clear” in the sense of removing trees).

The whole area was throughout the Middle Ages part of the local feudal territory known as the Idarbann, both politically and ecclesiastically. One of the first measures undertaken by these new settlers was the establishment of churches; the ones in Birkenfeld and Brombach (see Niederbrombach, Oberbrombach) were already being mentioned in documents dating from about 700.

The old greater parish of Idar might originally have been coëxtensive with the judicial region of the Idarbann. The execution place of this region was found at the point where Mackenrodt's, Algenrodt's and Idar's limits all met each other, a spot that even today in the official cadastral nomenclature still bears the name Galgenberg – “Gallows Mountain”. To the parish of Idar, the Reformation came quite early on, before 1544.

No later than 1320 or 1321, the Idarbann belonged as a subfief to the Imperial Lordship of Oberstein. Mackenrodt had its first documentary mention in the enfeoffment document as a result. The village shared its fate with the rest of the Idarbann in a political and economic sense. Thus, Mackenrodt passed along with the rest of the Idarbann to the “Hinder” County of Sponheim in 1766, and then in 1771 to the Margraviate of Baden, and soon thereafter to the French Republic – as of 1804 the Empire. In 1814, the area found itself under a joint Imperial-Royal Austrian and Royal Bavarian “State Administrative Commission” (Landesverwaltungskommission) before the Congress of Vienna awarded it to the Kingdom of Prussia, who in turn ceded it in 1817 to the Principality of Birkenfeld, an exclave of the Grand Duchy of Oldenburg, most of whose territory was in what is now northwest Germany, with a coastline on the North Sea. In 1918, Oldenburg became a “free state” within Weimar Germany. The Third Reich finally merged Oldenburg with Prussia in 1937. Since 1948, Mackenrodt has been part of the then newly founded state of Rhineland-Palatinate.

The discovery of agate at the old execution place, the Galgenberg, set the course for the whole region's economic development. Over the centuries, Idar – now merged with Oberstein – became a world centre of the gemstone industry.

Mackenrodt farmers found extra work as stone miners and agate grinders, as well as, later, as goldsmiths, grinding machine operators and diamond grinders. Nevertheless, agriculture and livestock raising for feeding the population remained until the end of the 19th century the more important industry. In 1833, Mackenrodt was described as “a village feeding itself by cropraising and livestock raising, lying one hour from Idar, with which it is parochially united.”

At the time, the village had 178 inhabitants, 176 of whom were Evangelical, while the other two were Catholic. The municipal area measured 1,810 Morgen (490 ha). The village was made up of 27 private buildings and one schoolhouse. One hundred and fifty years later, there were about 100 buildings, among them a church, administered as a branch church of Idar, and a sport clubhouse, which was also used as a community centre.

With 400 or so inhabitants, Mackenrodt is still well behind most of the other smaller communities around Idar-Oberstein's periphery. The marked growth seen in, for instance, Göttschied, Kirschweiler or Rötsweiler-Nockenthal, where ample building development areas have attracted people from Idar-Oberstein who could not find property in their own town, simply is not replicated in Mackenrodt. Another factor that may explain the weak growth in Mackenrodt is the village's lack of a main road running through it. There are only six businesses in the village, all dealing with gemstones, but each one employs only one or two persons. Most people in Mackenrodt must commute to their jobs, mostly in Idar-Oberstein. This is easy enough for those with cars, but public transport links are bad, especially in the evening.

== Politics ==
=== Municipal council ===
The council is made up of 8 council members, who were elected by majority vote at the municipal election held on 7 June 2009, and the honorary mayor as chairman.

=== Mayor ===
Mackenrodt's mayor is Reiner Mildenberger, and his deputies are Klaus Gans and Gerd Nilius.

=== Coat of arms ===
The municipality's arms might be described thus: Per bend chequy argent and gules, and vert a spade blade argent.

Mackenrodt's arms are unusual in that they have a “chequy” field whose tinctures begin in dexter chief with the metal rather than the colour. This, at least, is what can be seen in this article, at the municipality's own website and at the Verbandsgemeinde’s website. While this arrangement is usual under English heraldic rules, it is rather unusual in German heraldry. An example of Mackenrodt's arms with the chequy field beginning with the colour rather than the metal can be seen at Heraldry of the World.

== Economy and infrastructure ==
=== Transport ===
To the south runs Bundesstraße 41. Serving Idar-Oberstein is a railway station that, as a Regional-Express and Regionalbahn stop, is linked by way of the Nahe Valley Railway (Bingen–Saarbrücken) to the Saarland and the Frankfurt Rhine Main Region. The Rhein-Nahe-Express running the Mainz-Saarbrücken route serves the station hourly. Every other train goes through to the main railway station in Frankfurt with a stop at Frankfurt Airport. Formerly, fast trains on the Frankfurt-Paris route had a stop at Idar-Oberstein.

== Famous people ==
- Thomas A. Ruhk (1973– ), writer
