= Meckenbach, Birkenfeld =

Meckenbach
- Municipality
- Coat of arms

- Location of Meckenbach within Birkenfeld district
- Interactive map of Meckenbach
- Location within Germany Location within Rhineland-Palatinate
- Coordinates: 49°37′2″N 7°5′51″E
- Country: Germany
- State: Rhineland-Palatinate
- District: Birkenfeld
- Municipal assoc.: Birkenfeld

Government
  - Mayor (2019–24): Stefan Bill

Area
  - Total: 3.79 km^{2} (1.46 sq mi)
- Elevation: 413 m (1,355 ft)

Population (2025-12-31)
  - Total: 105
  - Density: 27.7/km^{2} (71.8/sq mi)
- Time zone: UTC+01:00 (CET)
  - Summer (DST): UTC+02:00 (CEST)
- Postal codes: 55767
- Dialling codes: 06782
- Vehicle registration: BIR

Meckenbach (German pronunciation: [ˈmɛkn̩bax]) is an Ortsgemeinde – a municipality belonging to a Verbandsgemeinde, a kind of collective municipality – in the Birkenfeld district in Rhineland-Palatinate, Germany. It belongs to the Verbandsgemeinde of Birkenfeld, whose seat is in the like-named town.

== Geography ==
=== Location ===
The municipality lies in the westernmost part of the Birkenfeld district on the like-named river Meckenbach in a hollow at the edge of the Schwarzwälder Hochwald (forest) in the Hunsrück. The municipal limit runs concurrently for more than 5 km with the boundary with the Saarland. The municipal area measures 378 ha, of which 220 ha is wooded, mainly with mixed forest, and it is also mostly privately owned.

== History ==
In 1334, Meckenbach had its first documentary mention. On this occasion, a certain “Cuno in den Gassen zu Birkenfeld” (“Cuno in the laneways at Birkenfeld”) vowed that he would “improve” his holding at the estate in Meckenbach and in future try harder to maintain it in a better state. The very name Meckenbach, though, makes it clear that the place was settled a few centuries earlier, for it is typical of placenames from the time when the Franks took over the land between the 6th and 9th century. The land had already been settled in prehistoric times, of course. A dig by Prof. Dr. H. Baldes before the First World War at a barrow 500 m southwest of the village in the cadastral area known as “Auf dem Bühl in Sangbösch” yielded objects from early La Tène times (no later than 225 BC).

Meckenbach's history is tightly bound with the Pflege (literally “care”, but actually a local geopolitical unit) and the parish of Achtelsbach, to which also belonged, among others, the villages of Brücken (the part on the Traun's right bank only), Traunen, Eisen and Obersötern, and an estate between Meckenbach and Obersötern called Haupenthal.

Beginning in 1480 the lordship and court were held by Louis I, Count Palatine of Zweibrücken. The Counts Palatine of Birkenfeld, even though they were the kin, had no say in the village's affairs. The Lords of Sötern, and thereby the Duchy of Lorraine, had taxation rights in the Pflege of Achtelsbach, and also determined who the parish priest would be. This often complicated matters. For instance, in 1523, the Reformation was introduced into the Duchy of Zweibrücken, but much to a later Duke's displeasure, the priest in Achtelsbach kept preaching Catholic belief for some years thereafter, until the Reformation also took hold in Sötern.

What is clear from the Achtelsbach church books is that 400 years ago, a milder climate must have prevailed in the area. In 1579, for instance, the clergyman deemed it worthy of mention that “in the middle of October, a great cold fell, and the grapes froze on the vine”. Also from these books, it is known that in 1609, Meckenbach was a hamlet of seven houses and 29 inhabitants: 6 married couples, 12 children, 3 widows, 1 manservant and 1 maidservant.

Prof. Dr. H. Baldes reports that in the 19th century, in and near Meckenbach, money, sometimes in great amounts, was sometimes found, presumably having been hidden in the Thirty Years' War. It may have been that since Meckenbach lay somewhat off the military road that led from Birkenfeld by way of Brücken, Achtelsbach and Sötern to Tholey, it was considered a safe haven of sorts.

On 25 September 1635, when the fleeing Swedish-French army under Duke Bernard of Weimar was using the said military road to retreat to France, Meckenbach escaped calamity. Brücken, Eisen and Haupenthal were not so lucky and were burnt down; it was 30 years before they were once again settled. In June 1639, on the other hand, Meckenbach was the only village in the local area to be plundered by the Spaniards, who luckily did not also burn the village down.

The municipality of Meckenbach took part in the contest Unser Dorf soll schöner werden (“Our village should become lovelier”) from 1971 to 1975 with great success, as witnessed by several awards on the state level. The high point came on 23 November 1973 when Meckenbach won the Rhineland-Palatinate gold medal in the contest. This was presented at the Electoral Palace in Mainz amid great festivity, with the municipality's male singing club, Männergesangverein 1896 Meckenbach, participating.

Since that time, there have been infrastructure improvements in the municipality such as roadway upgrades, the building of a fire station and a community centre and sewerage. As of 2004, the contest commission began appraising Meckenbach again. In 2004, in the district contest, now known as Unser Dorf hat Zukunft (“Our village has a future”), Meckenbach managed third place, and the regional commission currently ranks it as second in the main class.

== Politics ==
=== Municipal council ===
The council is made up of 6 council members, who were elected by majority vote at the municipal election held on 7 June 2009, and the honorary mayor as chairman.

=== Mayor ===
Meckenbach's mayor is Stefan Bill.

=== Coat of arms ===
The municipality's arms might be described thus: Per fess vert a cramp fesswise between six mullets, three chevronwise above and three chevronwise reversed below, all argent, and sable issuant from base a demilion Or armed, langued and crowned gules.

== Culture and sightseeing ==
=== Buildings ===
The following are listed buildings or sites in Rhineland-Palatinate’s Directory of Cultural Monuments:

- Dorfstraße 10 – Quereinhaus (a combination residential and commercial house divided for these two purposes down the middle, perpendicularly to the street), 1808
- Trauntalweg 3 – stately Quereinhaus, partly timber-frame, 1816

== Economy and infrastructure ==
=== Transport ===
To the east run Bundesstraßen 41 and 269. Two Autobahnen also pass near Meckenbach: the A 62 (Kaiserslautern–Trier) to the south and the A 1 to the west. The Bostalsee and Oberhambach recreational areas are each about ten minutes’ drive away. Saarbrücken, Trier and Kaiserslautern can all be reached by Autobahn in roughly half an hour, as can the towns of Idar-Oberstein and Sankt Wendel over Bundesstraße 41.

Serving nearby Neubrücke and Türkismühle are railway stations on the Nahe Valley Railway (Bingen–Saarbrücken).

Agriculture once characterized the village scene in Meckenbach, but in recent decades, the village's economic underpinnings have undergone a great shift. Nowadays, Meckenbach has only one full-time farmer tending a farm in the municipality. Meckenbach is a rather quiet village, despite lying right near two Autobahnen (which would usually make a place attractive to commercial interests), and to satisfy the demand for building land from both its own citizens and those from outside, the municipality had to open up a new building area.
