= Oberbrombach =

- Municipality
- Coat of arms

- Location of Oberbrombach within Birkenfeld district
- Interactive map of Oberbrombach
- Location within Germany Location within Rhineland-Palatinate
- Coordinates: 49°41′57″N 7°15′42″E
- Country: Germany
- State: Rhineland-Palatinate
- District: Birkenfeld
- Municipal assoc.: Birkenfeld

Government
  - Mayor (2019–24): Rüdiger Scherer

Area
  - Total: 6.56 km^{2} (2.53 sq mi)
- Elevation: 474 m (1,555 ft)

Population (2025-12-31)
  - Total: 377
  - Density: 57.5/km^{2} (149/sq mi)
- Time zone: UTC+01:00 (CET)
  - Summer (DST): UTC+02:00 (CEST)
- Postal codes: 55767
- Dialling codes: 06787
- Vehicle registration: BIR

Oberbrombach is an Ortsgemeinde – a municipality belonging to a Verbandsgemeinde, a kind of collective municipality – in the Birkenfeld district in Rhineland-Palatinate, Germany. It belongs to the Verbandsgemeinde of Birkenfeld, whose seat is in the like-named town.

== Geography ==
The municipality lies 8 km west of Idar-Oberstein and 10 km northeast of Birkenfeld.

== History ==
In 1324, Oberbrombach had its first documentary mention. Ten or perhaps as many as twelve families lived here then. It can be assumed, though, that the village had existed long before that as a permanently populated place. In the document in question, twelve men are mentioned by name as having to vouch to Countess Loretta of Sponheim that they would prevent any flight from the land. Oberbrombach was thereafter a relatively important place for those days. It was at the time favoured by its location at the crossing of two ancient travel routes. The road from Metz by way of Birkenfeld to Oberstein crossed the way from the Moselle by way of Allenbach to the Frauenburg (castle) and on to the river Glan.

A good hundred years after the first documentary mention, the village was bereft of any villagers. Quite likely, those that had lived in Oberbrombach in the latter half of the 14th century had fallen victim to the Plague, which was rife in those days. In the 1438 Sponheim taxation book listing payments in kind, it was noted that ten considerable farmsteads were to be found in Oberbrombach, but that nobody dwelt there any longer. In 1465, four farmsteads were once more occupied. In 1563, twelve families were counted in the village; by 1607, this had risen to 27.

In the Thirty Years' War, Oberbrombach, like other villages in the area, was hit hard. After the war had ended, the village boasted only seven families. Only slowly did the population recover from this blow over the decades that followed. In 1723, seventeen farmsteads were once more occupied, and there were 81 inhabitants in the village. This had risen to 34 families and 160 inhabitants by 1777.

The area of land available for farming was not quite enough to feed the population. Many times the reeves had to avail themselves of help from the Amt administration in Birkenfeld to defend the ancestral municipal and grazing rights boundaries against livestock herds from Rötsweiler and those belonging to the tenants of the lordly Winnenberger Hof (farming estate). About 1780, the first municipal land distribution came into force; that is to say, land owned by the municipality was shared out to private owners to boost agricultural production. In 1817, Oberbrombach passed as part of the Principality of Birkenfeld to the Grand Duchy of Oldenburg.

From 1830 to 1890, 91 persons emigrated from the village, most out of pure need, to seek better economic conditions elsewhere, mainly in North and South America. About the middle of the 19th century, the agate-grinding trade gained a foothold in the village. Anyone who did not own enough land to feed his family had to look around for extra work. These people went mainly to the grinding mills on the Schwollbach, and a few went to the ones on the river Nahe. There was only ever one such mill within Oberbrombach's limits. It was built about 1850, but was torn down only several years later, in 1856, to make way for the new Rhine-Nahe Railway.

The farming population's burden of work was greatly lightened when the municipality acquired a steam-powered threshing machine. In 1884, the local farmers founded a Dampf-Dresch-Actiengesellschaft (“Steam Threshing Corporation”). Over the years that followed, Oberbrombach's steam threshing machine found itself in service in many of the surrounding villages, too; it could be hired at hourly rates.

Standing in contrast to the general poverty suffered by most people in the village in the latter half of the 19th century was the municipality's own wealth. No other municipality for a great distance in any direction could boast such riches as Oberbrombach could. Over decades the Schöffen (roughly “lay jurists”) and the municipal council had ancient woodlands felled, mainly oak and pine, in rank overexploitation, using the proceeds to fill the municipal coffers. Tree bark sales, too, brought good earnings until 1890. Municipal councillors in those days behaved like bankers. The earnings were lent out to interest-paying borrowers in the area.

In 1825, the municipality made a building – a herdsman's house – available as a Schullocal (roughly “branch school”) for the first time. In 1842, the first new schoolhouse was built. In 1887 the municipality established a graveyard. In the years that followed, there was much talk about building a central waterworks. It was not until 1908, however, that work was finished on the watermain, which was fed by two springs more than 6 km away from Oberbrombach, up above Leisel. At the same time, a newer schoolhouse was being planned; it was completed in 1911.

In 1912, Oberbrombach was connected to the electrical grid; even the old steam threshing machine was converted to electrical operation that same year. Moreover, electricity made work much easier for the gemstone grinders. Instead of having to trudge daily down to the mill on a river several kilometres away to work at their trade, they could now set up grinding and polishing shops right in their houses.

Upon the outbreak of the First World War, the municipal bell was melted down for war requirements, and the municipality ploughed a substantial amount of its wealth into war bonds. In four years’ time, of course, history showed what a poor investment this was. When Germany lost the war, Oberbrombach lost all its wealth. After many years of making loans to borrowers, the municipality itself had to become a borrower.

Beginning in the late 1920s, diamond grinders quickly rose in importance in Oberbrombach. In the years between the world wars, more than half the village's families were “grinder-farmers”. Next to the gemstone-grinding trade, craftsmen and -women in other trades in the village were numerically insignificant.

In 1937, in the time of the Third Reich, Oberbrombach passed to Prussia’s Birkenfeld district. After the Second World War, the village belonged to the French zone of occupation. Since 1946, it has been part of the then newly founded state of Rhineland-Palatinate.

Also after the war, an even swifter economic shift came about in Oberbrombach. Agriculture quickly lost much importance, and gemstone grinding temporarily enjoyed an economic boom, but its heyday only lasted until the 1960s.

Since 1973 Oberbrombach has belonged to the Verbandsgemeinde of Birkenfeld. After school services were permanently moved to the Mittelpunktschule (“midpoint school”, a central school, designed to eliminate smaller outlying schools) in Niederbrombach, the municipality converted the two schoolrooms in Oberbrombach into a community centre in 1981. In the 1990s, the sewer system was overhauled and the village streets were cobbled or paved with asphalt. Today the workforce is all but exclusively made up of those who work at jobs outside the municipality. Of the once more than 40 primary and secondary agricultural operations in the village, only three are left.

== Politics ==
=== Municipal council ===
The council is made up of 12 council members, who were elected by majority vote at the municipal election held on 7 June 2009, and the honorary mayor as chairman.

=== Mayor ===
Oberbrombach's mayor is Rüdiger Scherer.

=== Coat of arms ===
The municipality's arms might be described thus: Or a bend wavy abased and in sinister a blackberry palewise, the stem couped to base, all vert, the chief countercompony gules and argent.

== Culture and sightseeing ==
=== Buildings ===
The following are listed buildings or sites in Rhineland-Palatinate’s Directory of Cultural Monuments:

- Hauptstraße 19 – former herdsman's house and schoolhouse; one-floor Quereinhaus (a combination residential and commercial house divided for these two purposes down the middle, perpendicularly to the street), quarrystone barn with half-hipped roof and belltower set on top, earlier half of the 19th century

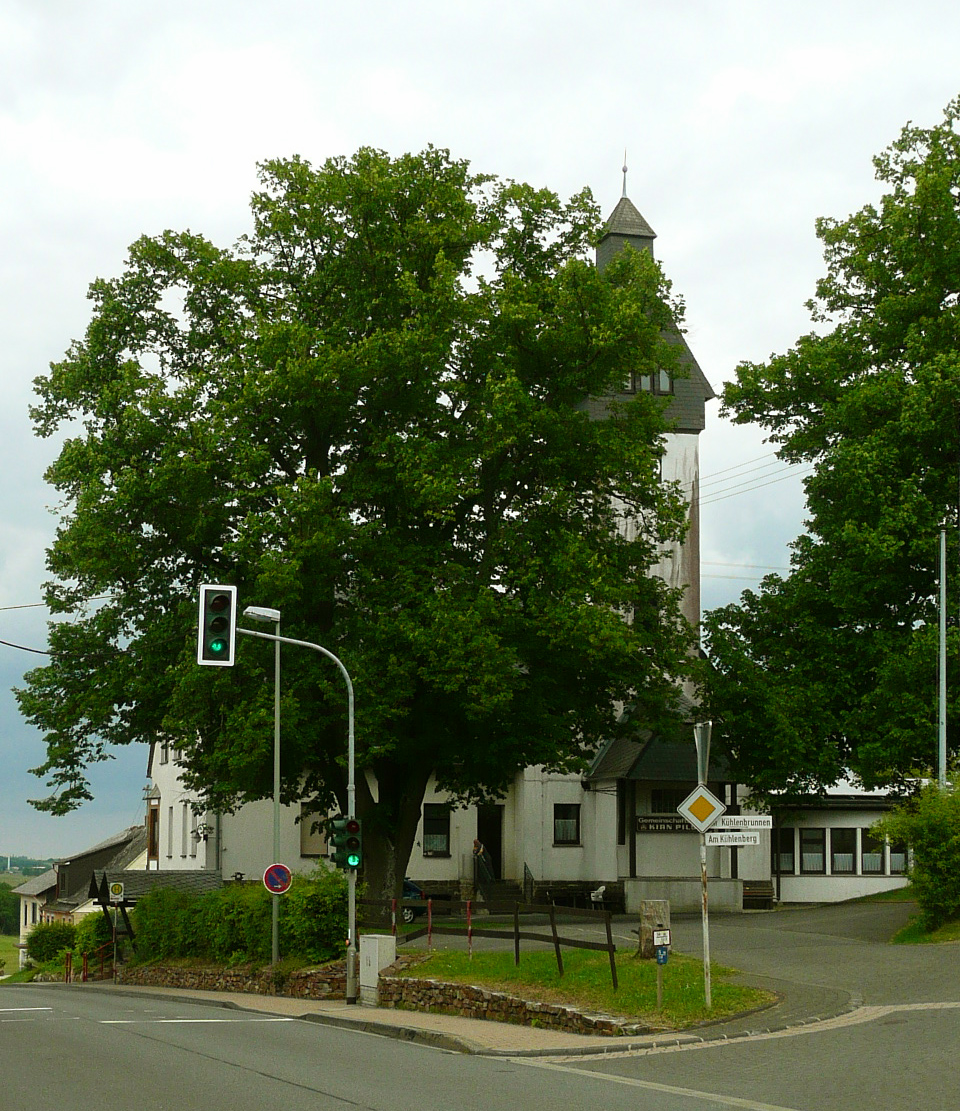
Quereinhaus

== Economy and infrastructure ==
=== Transport ===
Running through the village is Bundesstraße 41. In nearby Idar-Oberstein, the railway station, as a Regional-Express and Regionalbahn stop, is linked by way of the Nahe Valley Railway (Bingen–Saarbrücken) to the Saarland and the Frankfurt Rhine Main Region. The Rhein-Nahe-Express running the Mainz-Saarbrücken route serves the station hourly. Every other train goes through to the main railway station in Frankfurt with a stop at Frankfurt Airport. Formerly, fast trains on the Frankfurt-Paris route had a stop at Idar-Oberstein.
