= Schwollen =

- Municipality
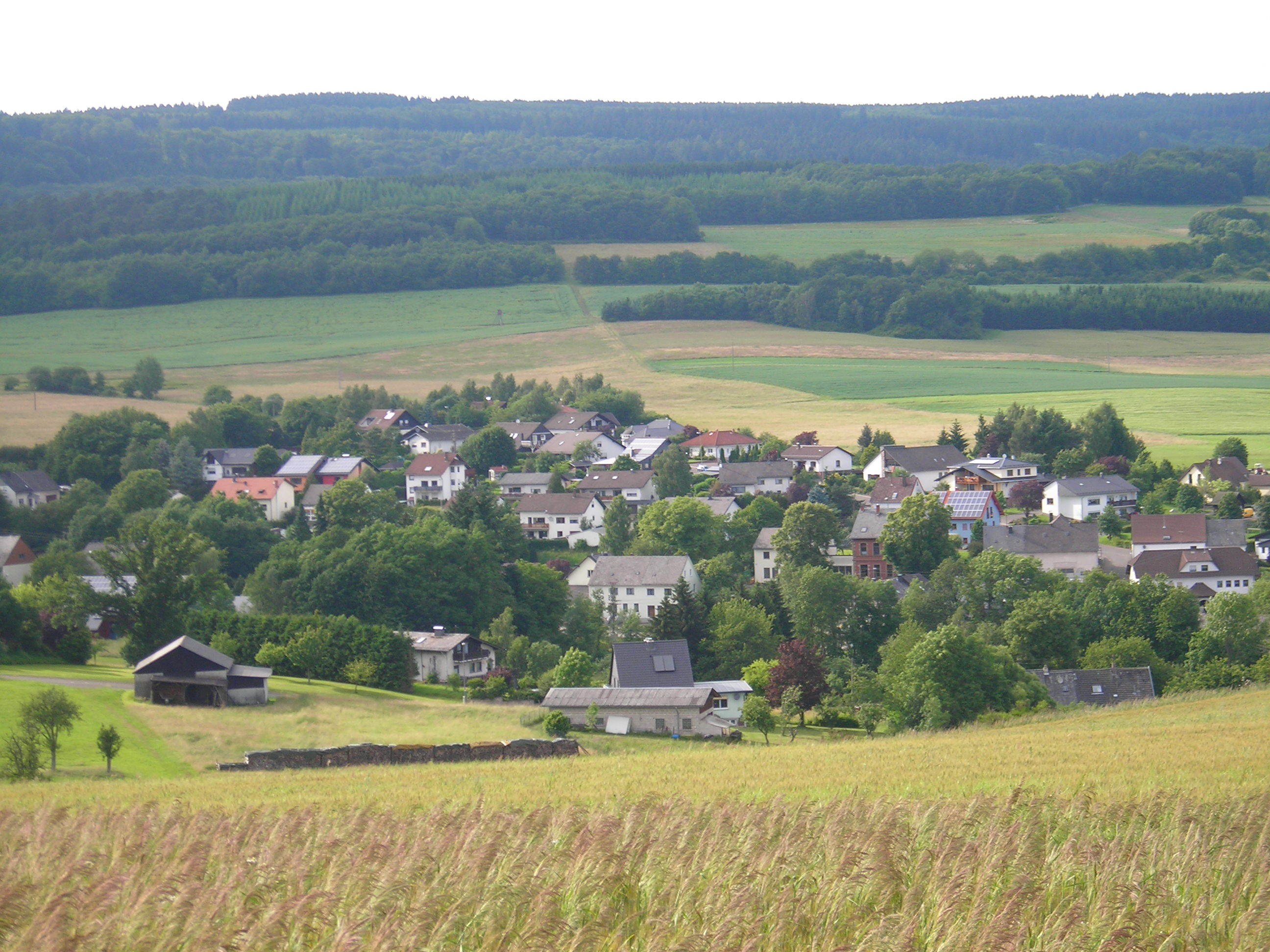

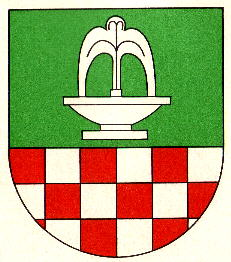
- Coat of arms

- Location of Schwollen within Birkenfeld district
- Interactive map of Schwollen
- Location within Germany Location within Rhineland-Palatinate
- Coordinates: 49°42′26″N 7°10′58″E
- Country: Germany
- State: Rhineland-Palatinate
- District: Birkenfeld
- Municipal assoc.: Birkenfeld

Government
  - Mayor (2019–24): Heiko Herber

Area
  - Total: 8.82 km^{2} (3.41 sq mi)
- Elevation: 414 m (1,358 ft)

Population (2025-12-31)
  - Total: 462
  - Density: 52.4/km^{2} (136/sq mi)
- Time zone: UTC+01:00 (CET)
  - Summer (DST): UTC+02:00 (CEST)
- Postal codes: 55767
- Dialling codes: 06787
- Vehicle registration: BIR

Schwollen (German pronunciation: [ˈʃvɔlən]) is an Ortsgemeinde – a municipality belonging to a Verbandsgemeinde, a kind of collective municipality – in the Birkenfeld district in Rhineland-Palatinate, Germany. It belongs to the Verbandsgemeinde of Birkenfeld, whose seat is in the like-named town.

The village is known for its mineral springs.

== Geography ==
=== Location ===
The municipality lies on the Schwollbach at the edge of the Schwarzwälder Hochwald (forest). This part of the Hochwald is the southwestern part of the Hunsrück. The municipal area is 63% wooded. The mineral water that comes from the springs is bottled by two companies.

=== Neighbouring municipalities ===
Schwollen borders in the northeast on the municipality of Leisel, in the east on the municipality of Wilzenberg-Hußweiler, in the south on the municipality of Niederhambach, in the southwest on the municipality of Hattgenstein and in the northwest on the municipality of Allenbach.

== History ==
Schwollen formerly belonged to the “Hinder” County of Sponheim.

== Politics ==
=== Municipal council ===
The council is made up of 8 council members, who were elected by majority vote at the municipal election held on 7 June 2009, and the honorary mayor as chairman.

=== Coat of arms ===
The German blazon reads: In geteiltem Schild oben in Grün ein silberner Schalenbrunnen mit geteiltem silbernen Wasserstrahl, unten rot-silbern geschacht.

The municipality's arms might in English heraldic language be described thus: Per fess vert a fountain with a basin, the stream falling to both sinister and dexter, argent, and chequy gules and argent.

The fountain in the upper field stands for the many mineral springs that lie within the municipality's limits, while the field tincture, vert (green), stands for Schwollen's wealth of woodland. The “chequy” pattern in the lower field is a reference to the village's former allegiance to the “Hinder” County of Sponheim.

The arms have been borne since 24 March 1965.

== Culture and sightseeing ==
=== Buildings ===
The following are listed buildings or sites in Rhineland-Palatinate’s Directory of Cultural Monuments:

- Before Hauptstraße 18 – smithy, about 1880; technical equipment
- Schulstraße 5 – estate complex along the street, today's appearance from the early 20th century

== Economy and infrastructure ==
=== Transport ===
Running west of the municipality is Bundesstraße 269. Serving Kronweiler, some 9 km away, is a railway station on the Nahe Valley Railway (Bingen–Saarbrücken).

Since 1937 there has been an outdoor swimming pool in Schwollen. Furthermore, there are a kindergarten, a bakery, a restaurant and other commercial operations, among these two mineral water bottlers and a fire control company. The Sirona-Weg adventure trail and the Verbandsgemeinde of Birkenfeld hiking circuit run straight through the municipality.
