= Elchweiler =

- Municipality
- Coat of arms

- Location of Elchweiler within Birkenfeld district
- Interactive map of Elchweiler
- Location within Germany Location within Rhineland-Palatinate
- Coordinates: 49°40′23″N 7°12′02″E
- Country: Germany
- State: Rhineland-Palatinate
- District: Birkenfeld
- Municipal assoc.: Birkenfeld

Government
  - Mayor (2019–24): Helmut Aulenbach

Area
  - Total: 2.15 km^{2} (0.83 sq mi)
- Elevation: 370 m (1,210 ft)

Population (2025-12-31)
  - Total: 186
  - Density: 86.5/km^{2} (224/sq mi)
- Time zone: UTC+01:00 (CET)
  - Summer (DST): UTC+02:00 (CEST)
- Postal codes: 55765
- Dialling codes: 06782
- Vehicle registration: BIR

Elchweiler is an Ortsgemeinde – a municipality belonging to a Verbandsgemeinde, a kind of collective municipality – in the Birkenfeld district in Rhineland-Palatinate, Germany. It belongs to the Verbandsgemeinde of Birkenfeld, whose seat is in the like-named town.

== Geography ==
=== Location ===
The municipality lies on the Molkenbach in the Hunsrück.

=== Neighbouring municipalities ===
Elchweiler borders in the north on the municipality of Niederhambach and in the south on the municipality of Schmißberg.

=== Constituent communities ===
Also belonging to Elchweiler is the Ortsteil of “Alte Schule”. The homestead lies south of the village itself at the municipal boundary with Schmißberg.

== Politics ==
=== Municipal council ===
The council is made up of six council members, who were elected by majority vote at the municipal election held on 7 June 2009. They also elect an honorary mayor as chairman.

=== Mayor ===
Elchweiler's mayor is Helmut Aulenbach.

=== Coat of arms ===
The German blazon reads: Unter rot-silbern geschachtem Schildhaupt in Grün ein goldenes Elchgeweih mit Grind.

The municipality's arms might in English heraldic language be described thus: Under a chief countercompony gules and argent, vert an elk's attires fixed to the scalp Or.

The chief countercompony (that is, with two rows of squares of alternating tinctures) recalls the arms formerly borne by the “Hinder” County of Sponheim, which were “Chequy gules and argent” (that is, the whole escutcheon was covered by a checkerboard pattern of red and silver), and thereby also the Sponheims former feudal rule over Elchweiler. The elk antlers and scalp are a canting charge for the municipality's name, which literally means “Elk Hamlet” (meant here is the Eurasian elk, or moose), although this is, in fact, an example of folk etymology.

The arms have been borne since 23 September 1964.

== Economy and infrastructure ==
=== Transport ===
To the south runs Bundesstraße 41, which leads to the Autobahn A 62 (Kaiserslautern–Trier). Serving nearby Neubrücke is a railway station on the Nahe Valley Railway (Bingen–Saarbrücken).
