= Dienstweiler =

- Municipality
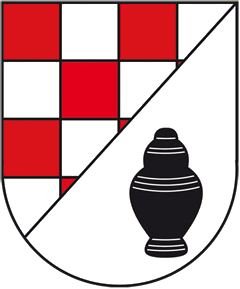
- Coat of arms

- Location of Dienstweiler within Birkenfeld district
- Interactive map of Dienstweiler
- Location within Germany Location within Rhineland-Palatinate
- Coordinates: 49°38′20″N 7°11′5″E
- Country: Germany
- State: Rhineland-Palatinate
- District: Birkenfeld
- Municipal assoc.: Birkenfeld

Government
  - Mayor (2019–24): Sebastian Caspary

Area
  - Total: 6.69 km^{2} (2.58 sq mi)
- Elevation: 397 m (1,302 ft)

Population (2025-12-31)
  - Total: 338
  - Density: 50.5/km^{2} (131/sq mi)
- Time zone: UTC+01:00 (CET)
  - Summer (DST): UTC+02:00 (CEST)
- Postal codes: 55765
- Dialling codes: 06782
- Vehicle registration: BIR
- Website: www.dienstweiler.de

Dienstweiler is an Ortsgemeinde – a municipality belonging to a Verbandsgemeinde, a kind of collective municipality – in the Birkenfeld district in Rhineland-Palatinate, Germany. It belongs to the Verbandsgemeinde of Birkenfeld, whose seat is in the like-named town.

== Geography ==
=== Location ===
Dienstweiler lies at the edge of the Hunsrück, southeast of the district seat of Birkenfeld, 2 km away. The old village centre is nestled in a dale on a small brook at an average elevation of 400 m above sea level. Outlying centres can be reached from the crossroads in the middle of the village, as can the “old new” building development called Auf dem Ellenberg, which sits at 450 m above sea level. The municipal area measures 667 ha, of which some 320 ha is wooded.

=== Constituent communities ===
Also belonging to Dienstweiler are the outlying homesteads of Eborn and Eborner Berg.

== History ==
Until the 17th century, the village went by the names Dintzwilr, Dyntzwilr, Dynczwiller and Dientzweiler before settling on the current form of the name, Dienstweiler. In 1367, Dienstweiler had its first documentary mention, and belonged to the “Hinder” County of Sponheim. The homestead of Eborn, which still exists today (roughly a kilometre outside the village itself) was formerly a self-administering municipality, but it merged with Dienstweiler sometime about 1544.

As early as the time around 1000 BC, the area where Dienstweiler now lies took its first steps into the realm of history. It is known from archaeological finds made in the “Auf Brand” barrow fields that quite a few people must have lived here then. These were the Treveri, a people of mixed Celtic and Germanic stock, from whom the Latin name for the city of Trier, Augusta Treverorum, is also derived. They were followed by the Romans (58 BC to AD 400) from whose time come the foundations of a country house – a villa rustica – unearthed in the municipality. Also brought to light at this site was a bronze wine service, which today is a major draw at the Birkenfelder Landesmuseum (Birkenfeld State Museum).

With the coming of the first permanent teacher, children from both Dienstweiler and Castle Birkenfeld were taught together beginning in 1785, although this institution did not last long. After it folded, Dienstweiler acquired its own school building in 1825, but this soon fell into such disrepair that it could no longer be used. At a municipal council meeting on 13 February 1849, it was decided that a new school would be built, and this was finished the following year. A new wing was built onto this school more than a century later, in 1955, and the school continued in this form until 1968, when school reform saw it close altogether. Now bereft of its original function, the school building gained a new purpose in 1985 when it was converted into a village community centre.

The early 1960s were a time of progress. In 1962 and 1963, Dienstweiler became the first village in the Amt of Birkenfeld to build its own sewer system and central sewage treatment plant. In 1960, a new building zone was laid out; 49 houses were built there, which made necessary a further development to the north (hence the reference to the “old new” building development). Although the inhabitants once drew their livelihoods mainly from agriculture, most now commute to jobs elsewhere in the area. Of the 26 agricultural operations that were once found here, only 4 are left.

=== Population development ===
- 1958: 217
- 1978: 267
- 1998: 335
- 2004: 320 (49.4% female)

In 1998, Dienstweiler had 159 families living in 90 houses on 9 streets. Fifty-nine percent are Evangelical. Foreign nationals are 5.7% of the population.

== Politics ==
=== Municipal council ===
The council is made up of 8 council members, who were elected by majority vote at the municipal election held on 7 June 2009, and the honorary mayor as chairman.

=== Mayor ===
Dienstweiler's mayor is Sebastian Caspary, re-elected in 2019. Previous mayors were:

- 1990–2014: Helmut Finck
- 1964–1989: Werner Bruch

=== Coat of arms ===
The German blazon reads: In schräglinks geteiltem Schild vorne rot-silbern geschacht, hinten in Silber eine schwarze Urne mit Deckel.

The municipality's arms might in English heraldic language be described thus: Per bend chequy gules and argent and argent an urn with lid sable.

The “chequy” pattern on the dexter (armsbearer's right, viewer's left) side is a reference to the village's former allegiance to the “Hinder” County of Sponheim, Oberamt of Birkenfeld, while the lidded urn on the sinister (armsbearer's left, viewer's right) side stands for the find of such an artefact at a barrow within the municipality's limits.

The arms have been borne since 7 December 1962.

== Culture and sightseeing ==
=== Buildings ===
The following are listed buildings or sites in Rhineland-Palatinate’s Directory of Cultural Monuments:

- Dorfstraße 9 – four-sided estate, begun in 1870; Quereinhaus (a combination residential and commercial house divided for these two purposes down the middle, perpendicularly to the street); stable wing and barn less old
- Im Eck 1 – corner estate, essentially 1650, commercial wing less old
- Near Im Eck 5 – cast-iron Gothic Revival fountain, late 19th century
- Im Eck 5 – former stately estate complex, 1862

== Economy and infrastructure ==
=== Transport ===
To the west runs Bundesstraße 41 and to the south lies the Autobahn A 62 (Kaiserslautern–Trier). Serving nearby Neubrücke is a railway station on the Nahe Valley Railway (Bingen–Saarbrücken).
