= Hattgenstein =

- Municipality
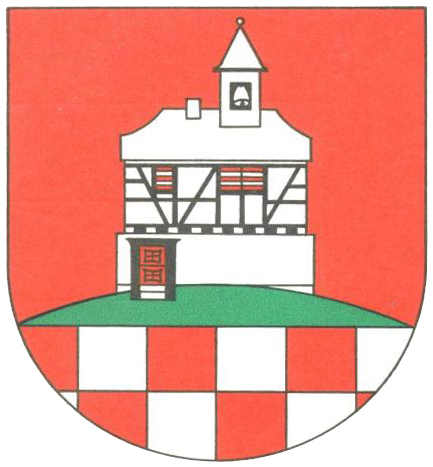
- Coat of arms

- Location of Hattgenstein within Birkenfeld district
- Interactive map of Hattgenstein
- Location within Germany Location within Rhineland-Palatinate
- Coordinates: 49°41′55″N 7°09′37″E
- Country: Germany
- State: Rhineland-Palatinate
- District: Birkenfeld
- Municipal assoc.: Birkenfeld

Government
  - Mayor (2019–24): Udo Laube

Area
  - Total: 8.21 km^{2} (3.17 sq mi)
- Elevation: 534 m (1,752 ft)

Population (2025-12-31)
  - Total: 258
  - Density: 31.4/km^{2} (81.4/sq mi)
- Time zone: UTC+01:00 (CET)
  - Summer (DST): UTC+02:00 (CEST)
- Postal codes: 55767
- Dialling codes: 06782
- Vehicle registration: BIR

Hattgenstein is an Ortsgemeinde – a municipality belonging to a Verbandsgemeinde, a kind of collective municipality – in the Birkenfeld district in Rhineland-Palatinate, Germany. It belongs to the Verbandsgemeinde of Birkenfeld, whose seat is in the like-named town.

== Geography ==
=== Location ===
The municipality lies at the edge of the Schwarzwälder Hochwald (forest) in the Hunsrück, and 72.2% of the municipal area is wooded. There is a widespread misconception that Hattgenstein, with its average elevation of 534 m above sea level, is the highest place in Rhineland-Palatinate, but this is not true. There are a few places, such as Stein-Neukirch in the High Westerwald and Nürburg in the Eifel, that are higher.

=== Neighbouring municipalities ===
To the northeast lies Schwollen, and to the south, Oberhambach.

=== Constituent communities ===
Also belonging to Hattgenstein are the outlying homesteads of Helmhof, Waldfriede and Zur Zimmerei.

== Politics ==
=== Municipal council ===
The council is made up of 6 council members, who were elected by majority vote at the municipal election held on 7 June 2009, and the honorary mayor as chairman.

=== Mayor ===
Hattgenstein's mayor is Udo Laube, re-elected in 2019.

=== Coat of arms ===
The municipality's arms might in English heraldic language be described thus: Over a base countercompony gules and argent, gules on a mount vert the Hattgenstein Glockenhaus argent with timber framing sable and doors and windows of the field.

== Culture and sightseeing ==
=== Buildings ===
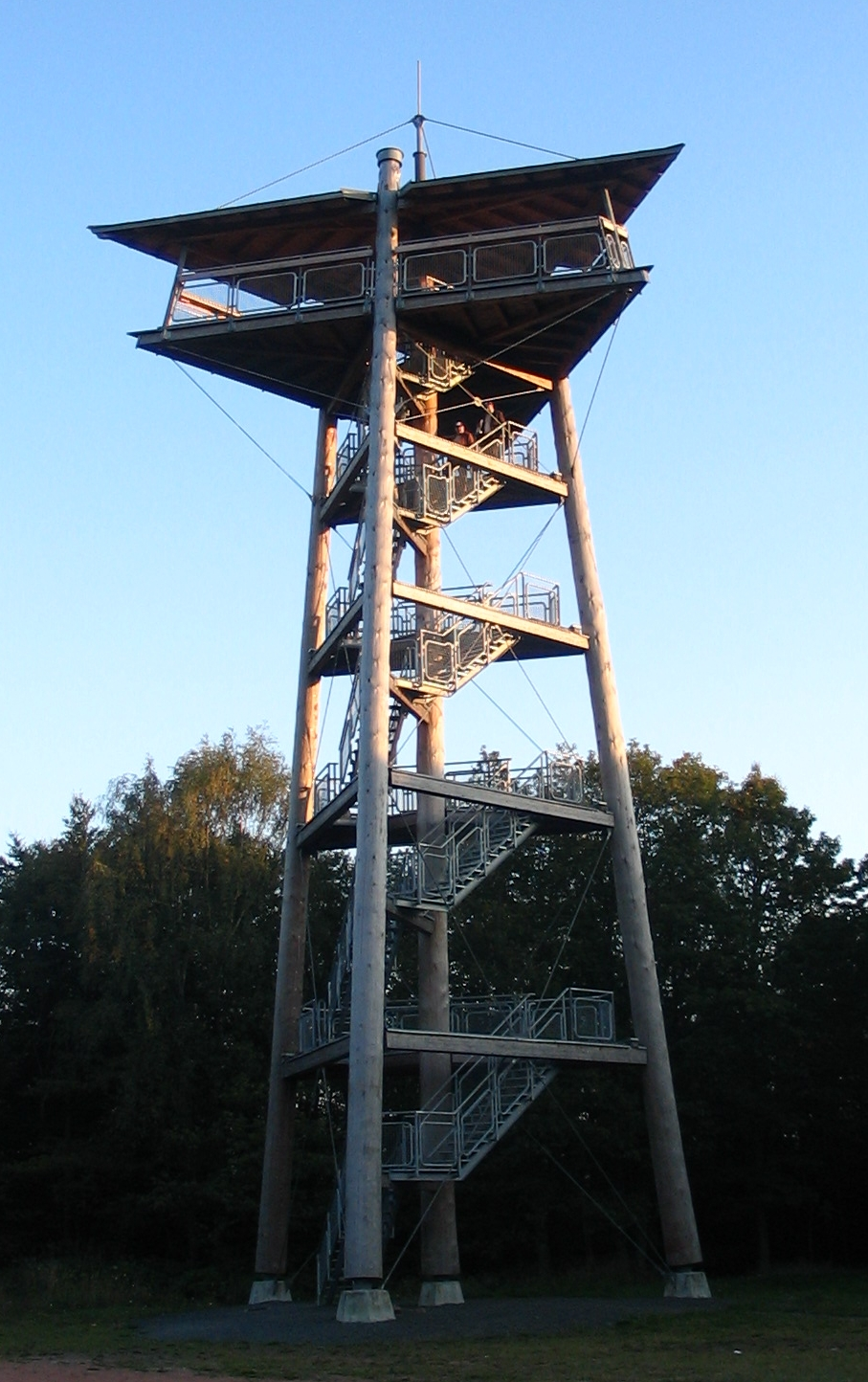
From the 28-metre-high lookout tower, a view of the Hunsrück countryside is possible

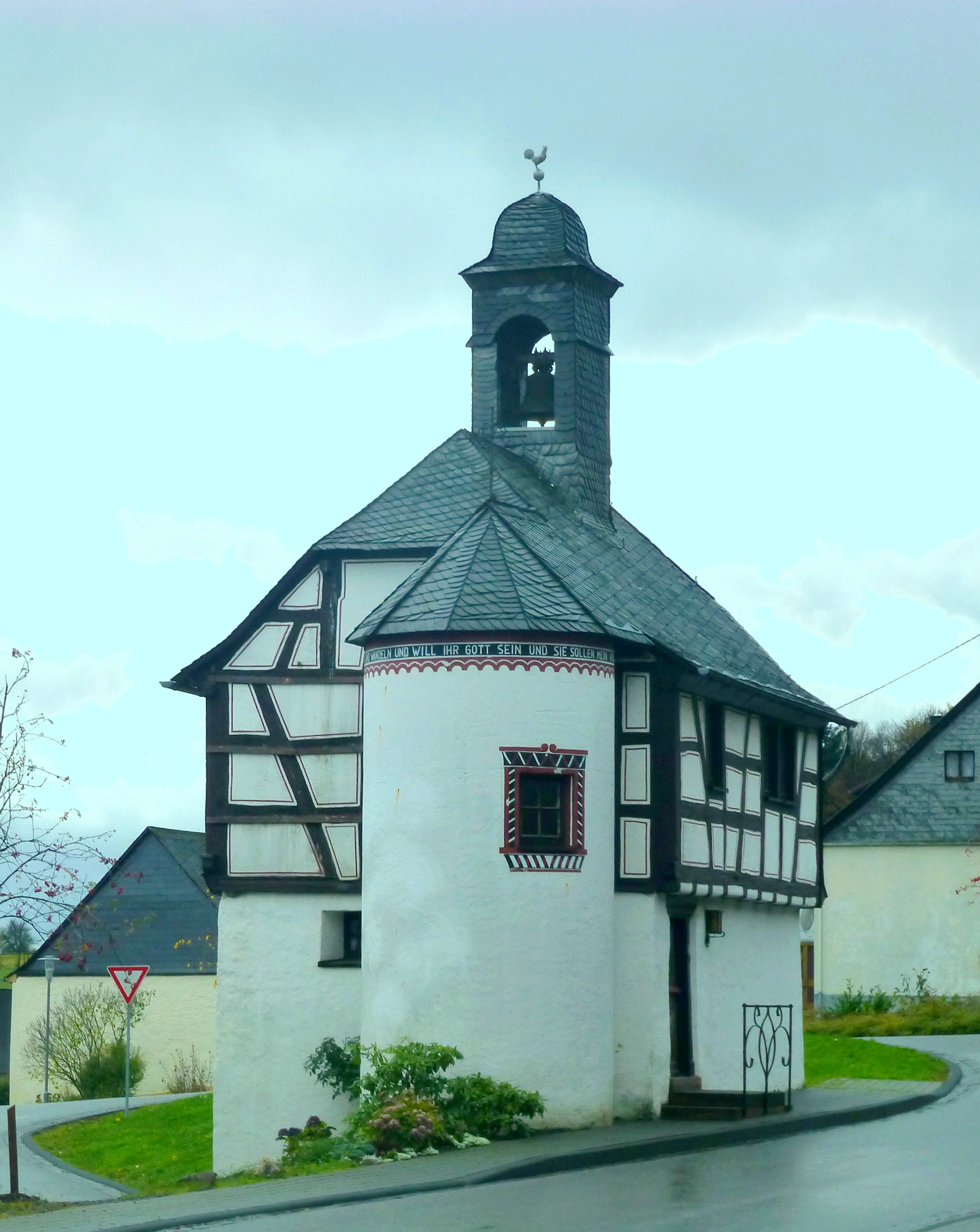
The 1762 built Glockenhaus

The following are listed buildings or sites in Rhineland-Palatinate’s Directory of Cultural Monuments:

- Am Brunnen 2 – Quereinhaus (a combination residential and commercial house divided for these two purposes down the middle, perpendicularly to the street), partly timber-frame, partly slated, late 18th or early 19th century
- Am Brunnen 4 – former winepress house, timber-frame building
- Flurstraße 3 – Quereinhaus, partly timber-frame, possibly from the earlier half of the 19th century
- Hauptstraße 13 – so-called Glockenhaus (“Bell House”); partly timber-frame, half-hipped roof, bell turret, 1762; characterizes village's appearance
- Hauptstraße 17 – stately Quereinhaus, partly timber-frame, possibly from the early 19th century

The Glockenhaus (“Bell House”) is Hattgenstein's main landmark. It was built in 1762 as a school building and a dwelling for the beadle.

=== Natural monuments ===
Hattgensteiner Fels, a crag with a lookout tower near the sporting ground, is believed to be the village's namesake.

== Economy and infrastructure ==
=== Transport ===
To the west runs Bundesstraße 269, and to the south, the Autobahn A 62 (Kaiserslautern–Trier). Available in nearby Neubrücke is a railway station on the Nahe Valley Railway (Bingen–Saarbrücken).
