= Birkenfeld (district) =

Coordinates: 49°40′N 7°20′E

- District
- Flag Coat of arms
- Country: Germany
- State: Rhineland-Palatinate
- Capital: Birkenfeld

Government
  - District admin.: Miroslaw Kowalski (CDU)

Area
  - Total: 777 km^{2} (300 sq mi)

Population (31 December 2025)
  - Total: 82,304
  - Density: 106/km^{2} (274/sq mi)
- Time zone: UTC+01:00 (CET)
  - Summer (DST): UTC+02:00 (CEST)
- Vehicle registration: BIR
- Website: landkreis-birkenfeld.de

Birkenfeld (German pronunciation: [ˈbɪʁkn̩ˌfɛlt]) is a district (Landkreis) in Rhineland-Palatinate, Germany. Its seat is the town of Birkenfeld. It is bounded by (from the south and clockwise) the districts of Sankt Wendel (Saarland), Trier-Saarburg, Bernkastel-Wittlich, Rhein-Hunsrück, Bad Kreuznach and Kusel.

== History ==
In the early nineteenth century, the Nahe River was the boundary between two tiny principalities: Birkenfeld, west of the Nahe; and Lichtenberg, east of it. The principality of Birkenfeld was annexed by Oldenburg in 1817; Lichtenberg became an exclave of the Duchy Saxe-Coburg (Saxe-Coburg-Saalfeld until 1826, Saxe-Coburg and Gotha thereafter). Prussia bought Lichtenberg in 1834 and made it the District of Sankt Wendel.

After World War I, the southern half of Sankt Wendel had to be ceded to the newly created Saar Territory, and the small part remaining in Prussia was then officially called the Restkreis Sankt Wendel ("remaining district of Sankt Wendel"). In 1937 the Oldenburgian District of Birkenfeld was merged with the remaining Sankt Wendel District to form the new Prussian District of Birkenfeld.

Following World War II, on 18 July 1946 by the French Ordinance No. 8, twenty-four more villages were ceded to the new Délégation Supérieure de la Sarre, which became the new Saar Protectorate in 1947. Not until 1970 were the present borders of the district set.

== Geography ==
The Nahe River runs through the district from south to north. The portions west of the river are located on the eastern slopes of the Hunsrück.

== Coat of arms ==
The German blazon reads: Geschachtet von Rot und Silber; belegt mit einem rot gezungten, golden gekrönten und golden bewehrten blauen Löwen.

The arms might in English heraldic language be described thus: Chequy of twenty gules and argent a lion rampant azure armed and crowned Or and langued of the first.

The chequered red and silver pattern was the arms of the Counts of Sponheim, a medieval county of the region. The lion is the symbol of the Counts of Veldenz.

== Towns and municipalities ==

Verband-free town: Idar-Oberstein

Verbandsgemeinden
1. Baumholder; 1. Baumholder^{1, 2}; 2. Berglangenbach; 3. Berschweiler bei Baumholder; 4. Eckersweiler; 5. Fohren-Linden; 6. Frauenberg; 7. Hahnweiler; 8. Heimbach; 9. Leitzweiler; 10. Mettweiler; 11. Reichenbach; 12. Rohrbach; 13. Rückweiler; 14. Ruschberg	2. Birkenfeld; 1. Abentheuer; 2. Achtelsbach; 3. Birkenfeld^{1, 2}; 4. Börfink; 5. Brücken; 6. Buhlenberg; 7. Dambach; 8. Dienstweiler; 9. Elchweiler; 10. Ellenberg; 11. Ellweiler; 12. Gimbweiler; 13. Gollenberg; 14. Hattgenstein; 15. Hoppstädten-Weiersbach; 16. Kronweiler; 17. Leisel; 18. Meckenbach; 19. Niederbrombach; 20. Niederhambach; 21. Nohen; 22. Oberbrombach; 23. Oberhambach; 24. Rimsberg; 25. Rinzenberg; 26. Rötsweiler-Nockenthal; 27. Schmißberg; 28. Schwollen; 29. Siesbach; 30. Sonnenberg-Winnenberg; 31. Wilzenberg-Hußweiler	3. Herrstein-Rhaunen; 1. Allenbach; 2. Asbach; 3. Bergen; 4. Berschweiler bei Kirn; 5. Bollenbach; 6. Breitenthal; 7. Bruchweiler; 8. Bundenbach; 9. Dickesbach; 10. Fischbach; 11. Gerach; 12. Gösenroth; 13. Griebelschied; 14. Hausen; 15. Hellertshausen; 16. Herborn; 17. Herrstein^{1}; 18. Hettenrodt; 19. Hintertiefenbach; 20. Horbruch; 21. Hottenbach; 22. Kempfeld; 23. Kirschweiler; 24. Krummenau; 25. Langweiler	26. Mackenrodt; 27. Mittelreidenbach; 28. Mörschied; 29. Niederhosenbach; 30. Niederwörresbach; 31. Oberhosenbach; 32. Oberkirn; 33. Oberreidenbach; 34. Oberwörresbach; 35. Rhaunen; 36. Schauren; 37. Schmidthachenbach; 38. Schwerbach; 39. Sensweiler; 40. Sien; 41. Sienhachenbach; 42. Sonnschied; 43. Stipshausen; 44. Sulzbach; 45. Veitsrodt; 46. Vollmersbach; 47. Weiden; 48. Weitersbach; 49. Wickenrodt; 50. Wirschweiler
^{1}seat of the Verbandsgemeinde; ^{2}town
