= Niederhambach =

- Municipality
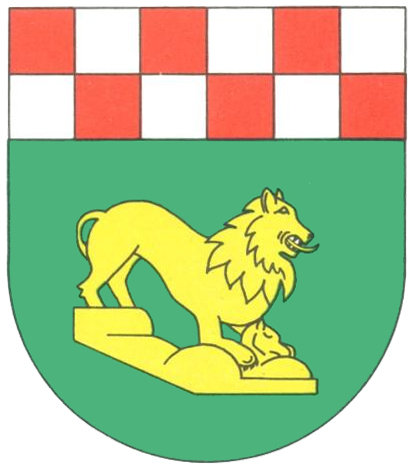
- Coat of arms

- Location of Niederhambach within Birkenfeld district
- Interactive map of Niederhambach
- Location within Germany Location within Rhineland-Palatinate
- Coordinates: 49°41′4″N 7°12′31″E
- Country: Germany
- State: Rhineland-Palatinate
- District: Birkenfeld
- Municipal assoc.: Birkenfeld

Government
  - Mayor (2019–24): Peter Schwarzbach

Area
  - Total: 9.77 km^{2} (3.77 sq mi)
- Elevation: 348 m (1,142 ft)

Population (2025-12-31)
  - Total: 308
  - Density: 31.5/km^{2} (81.6/sq mi)
- Time zone: UTC+01:00 (CET)
  - Summer (DST): UTC+02:00 (CEST)
- Postal codes: 55767
- Dialling codes: 06787
- Vehicle registration: BIR
- Website: www.niederhambach.de

Niederhambach is an Ortsgemeinde – a municipality belonging to a Verbandsgemeinde, a kind of collective municipality – in the Birkenfeld district in Rhineland-Palatinate, Germany. It belongs to the Verbandsgemeinde of Birkenfeld, whose seat is in the like-named town.

== Geography ==
=== Location ===
The municipality lies on the Hambach in the Hunsrück, roughly 6 km northeast of Birkenfeld.

=== Constituent communities ===
Niederhambach's Ortsteile are Böschweiler, Burbach and Heupweiler. The municipality also includes an outlying centre known as the Burbacher Siedlung. This is three farms established in 1936.

== History ==
In the Heupweiler cadastral areas known as “Geiershübel” and “Heiligenhübel”, archaeological finds from pre-Roman times have been made. In another area, the “Beel”, two sandstone lions from a Roman tomb were unearthed. They can now be found at the Birkenfeld Museum. On the path over the Böschweiler Höhe (heights) on the way to Wilzenberg, bronze rings from about 1000-500 BC were found in two barrows.

Standing in Böschweiler was a complex known as the Widdemhof, which belonged to the Brombach priest. It was made up of two buildings. Before the Reformation, the estate had to make payments to the priest. The local lore has it that the Widdemhof was once a monastery. Whether this is true or not, the Widdem, as it is called, is under church ownership to this day.

In 1338, Burbach had its first documentary mention. Count Johann III of Sponheim enfeoffed Prince-Archbishop-Elector Baldwin of Trier with his holdings at Burbach, whereupon he accepted from Baldwin the whole village as a fief. Johann III was the audacious Countess Lauretta's son.

In the 14th century, the Oberstein church owned a farm within Burbach's limits. Böschweiler's first documentary mention came in 1438.

The Salingshof was built by Lord Saling from Oberstein after he had earned money from building the Nahe Valley Railway and had bought land from what was then the self-administering municipality of Burbach. Lord Saling later sold this estate to Lord Scherer from Brücken who, having just come back from the United States, was used to a life of solitude. The family later gave this up and moved to Rimsberg.

Downstream from Burbach, on the Hambach's left bank, once lay a village called Klaffweiler, which is believed to have been devoid of any inhabitants by 1438. Its land was divided between Burbach and Brombach. At the turn of the 20th century, a bark mill stood downstream from Heupweiler, while in Böschweiler, a thriving tannery supplied the local farmers with sole leather.

The current municipality of Niederhambach came into being on 1 October 1933 through the merger of Böschweiler and Heupweiler. This was a result of a bill passed by the Free State of Oldenburg for the purpose of simplifying administration.

Flurbereinigung began even before Oldenburg was merged with Prussia in 1937, but the new Prussian administration delayed the project, and then the outbreak of the Second World War brought the whole endeavour to an end, at least for a while. The project was finally completed in 1955. A steady rise in the number of workers moving into other sectors of the economy, however, has led to a shift in Niederhambach's economy away from agriculture.

In 2000, a new building area was opened up in Böschweiler, and nine new houses have been built there.

Niederhambach participates in the project Unser Dorf hat Zukunft (“Our village has a future”), and has placed first in the main class.

== Politics ==
=== Municipal council ===
The council is made up of 8 council members, who were elected by proportional representation at the municipal election held on 7 June 2009, and the honorary mayor as chairman.

The municipal election held on 7 June 2009 yielded the following results:

Year	SPD	CDU	WG 1	WG 2	Total
2009	2	2	2	2	8 seats
2004	1	3	2	2	8 seats

=== Mayor ===
Niederhambach's mayor is Peter Schwarzbach.

=== Coat of arms ===
The German blazon reads: Unter rot-silbern geschachteltem Schildhaupt in grün die Darstellung der goldenen Skulptur eines links schauenden Löwen, der einen Widderkopf zwischen den Vorderpranken hält.

The municipality's arms might in English heraldic language be described thus: Vert an image of the sculpture of a lion, the head turned to sinister and a ram's head between his forepaws, all Or, the chief countercompony gules and argent.

The chief is a reference to the villages’ former allegiance to the “Hinder” County of Sponheim, which bore arms chequy gules and argent. Böschweiler, Burbach and Heupweiler were in the Sponheim Oberamt of Birkenfeld. The field tincture, vert (green), stands for the agriculture in the municipality. The charge on the green field refers to two such sandstone sculptures unearthed within the municipality's limits on the “Beel”.

The arms have been borne since 1965.

=== Town partnerships ===
Niederhambach fosters partnerships with the following places:

- Bulgnéville, Vosges, France, a commune in Lorraine

== Culture and sightseeing ==
=== Buildings ===
The following are listed buildings or sites in Rhineland-Palatinate’s Directory of Cultural Monuments:

==== Böschweiler ====
- Am Kissel 3 – so-called “Kloster” (“Monastery”); house, window walling possibly from about 1600, roof frame 1725, commercial building less old
- Mühlenweg 1 – so-called Fettigsmühle; Baroque Quereinhaus (a combination residential and commercial house divided for these two purposes down the middle, perpendicularly to the street), about 1800; technical equipment

==== Burbach ====
- At Hauptstraße 7 – elaborate portal, marked 1767

==== Heupweiler ====
- At Hochwaldstraße 1 – door lintel with inscription, 18th century
- Hochwaldstraße 8 – former Schneidersfranzenmühle; former gristmill with three-floor mill tower, essentially possibly from the 18th century (timber framing dendrochronologically dated to 1725)

== Economy and infrastructure ==
=== Transport ===
Running east of the municipality is Bundesstraße 41, which towards the south leads to the Autobahn A 62 (Kaiserslautern–Trier). Serving nearby Kronweiler is a railway station on the Nahe Valley Railway (Bingen–Saarbrücken).

=== Economy ===
In recent years there has been a considerable shift in the municipality’s economic structure. Many agricultural businesses have simply been forsaken because they did not have the financial wherewithal to modernize and expand. Furthermore, agriculture is not attracting much new blood. It would seem that few young people nowadays want to become farmers. Most workers today commute to jobs in nearby towns and villages.

=== Public institutions ===
In Niederhambach, an important part of the community is the fire brigade. The Freiwillige Feuerwehr Niederhambach (“Niederhambach Volunteer Fire Brigade”) was founded in January 1966 out of the compulsory fire brigade that had hitherto existed. The Volunteer Fire Brigade’s thirtieth anniversary was celebrated from 4 to 7 July 1997 in conjunction with the Fire Brigade Day held in the Verbandsgemeinde of Birkenfeld. The fire brigade also has a promotional association, which actively supports the firefighters.

=== Education ===
Niederhambach schoolchildren attend the Birkenfeld/Niederbrombach Regional School, the Realschule in Idar-Oberstein or the modern-languages Gymnasium in Birkenfeld. The local kindergarten is in Niederbrombach, and offers all-day care.

=== Established businesses ===
Among the crafts and skilled occupations in Niederhambach are a roofing business, an automotive workshop, a below-ground construction firm, a tile-laying business, a goldsmith's workshop, an automotive parts and repair shop, a game speciality and beekeeping business, an energy system and solar technology business and a health food store.

There are two inns in Niederhambach.

The number of agricultural operations, including those run as secondary businesses, is 5, although there are also 6 hobby farmers.

== Famous people ==
- Christina Jaworek, football referee
