= Birkenfeld (Verbandsgemeinde) =

- Verbandsgemeinde
- Coat of arms

- Location of Birkenfeld within Birkenfeld district
- Interactive map of Birkenfeld
- Location within Germany Location within Rhineland-Palatinate
- Coordinates: 49°39′N 7°10′E
- Country: Germany
- State: Rhineland-Palatinate
- District: Birkenfeld
- Seat: Birkenfeld
- Subdivisions: 31 municipalities

Area
  - Total: 213.43 km^{2} (82.41 sq mi)

Population (2025-12-31)
  - Total: 20,210
  - Density: 94.69/km^{2} (245.2/sq mi)
- Time zone: UTC+01:00 (CET)
  - Summer (DST): UTC+02:00 (CEST)
- Website: www.vg-birkenfeld.de

Birkenfeld (German pronunciation: [ˈbɪʁkn̩ˌfɛlt]) is a Verbandsgemeinde ("collective municipality") in the district of Birkenfeld, in Rhineland-Palatinate, Germany. The seat of the Verbandsgemeinde is in Birkenfeld.

The Verbandsgemeinde Birkenfeld consists of the following Ortsgemeinden ("local municipalities"):

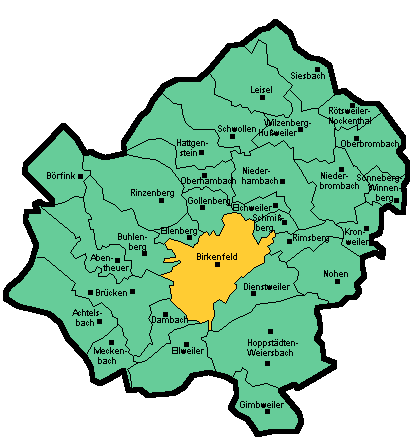

1. Abentheuer
2. Achtelsbach
3. Birkenfeld
4. Börfink
5. Brücken
6. Buhlenberg
7. Dambach
8. Dienstweiler
9. Elchweiler
10. Ellenberg
11. Ellweiler
12. Gimbweiler
13. Gollenberg
14. Hattgenstein
15. Hoppstädten-Weiersbach
16. Kronweiler
17. Leisel
18. Meckenbach
19. Niederbrombach
20. Niederhambach
21. Nohen
22. Oberbrombach
23. Oberhambach
24. Rimsberg
25. Rinzenberg
26. Rötsweiler-Nockenthal
27. Schmißberg
28. Schwollen
29. Siesbach
30. Sonnenberg-Winnenberg
31. Wilzenberg-Hußweiler
