= Buhlenberg =

- Municipality
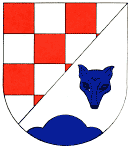
- Coat of arms

- Location of Buhlenberg within Birkenfeld district
- Interactive map of Buhlenberg
- Location within Germany Location within Rhineland-Palatinate
- Coordinates: 49°39′17″N 7°7′11″E
- Country: Germany
- State: Rhineland-Palatinate
- District: Birkenfeld
- Municipal assoc.: Birkenfeld

Government
  - Mayor (2019–24): Gunter Kronenberger

Area
  - Total: 8.44 km^{2} (3.26 sq mi)
- Elevation: 480 m (1,570 ft)

Population (2025-12-31)
  - Total: 460
  - Density: 55/km^{2} (140/sq mi)
- Time zone: UTC+01:00 (CET)
  - Summer (DST): UTC+02:00 (CEST)
- Postal codes: 55767
- Dialling codes: 06782
- Vehicle registration: BIR

Buhlenberg is an Ortsgemeinde – a municipality belonging to a Verbandsgemeinde, a kind of collective municipality – in the Birkenfeld district in Rhineland-Palatinate, Germany. It belongs to the Verbandsgemeinde of Birkenfeld, whose seat is in the like-named town.

== Geography ==
=== Location ===
The municipality lies three kilometres northwest of the district seat of Birkenfeld in the Schwarzwälder Hochwald (forest) in the Hunsrück, on the edge of the Naturpark Saar-Hunsrück near the Erbeskopf, Rhineland-Palatinate's highest mountain.

=== Constituent communities ===
Also belonging to Buhlenberg are the outlying homesteads of Berghof, Etzweilerhof, Grenzhof and Waldhof.

== History ==
Buhlenberg once belonged to the "Hinder" County of Sponheim.

From 29 July to 8 August 2009, the Bund der Pfadfinderinnen und Pfadfinder held its National Scout Jamboree in Buhlenberg.

== Politics ==
=== Municipal council ===
The council is made up of 12 council members, who were elected by majority vote at the municipal election held on 7 June 2009, and the honorary mayor as chairman.

=== Mayor ===
Buhlenberg's mayor is Gunter Kronenberger.

=== Coat of arms ===
The German blazon reads: In schräglinks geteiltem Schild vorne rot-silbern geschacht, hinten in Silber über blauem Dreiberg ein blauer Wolfskopf.

The municipality's arms might in English heraldic language be described thus: Per bend sinister chequy of gules and argent and argent issuant from base a mound of three, above which a wolf's head caboshed, both azure.

The “chequy” pattern on the dexter (armsbearer's right, viewer's left) side is a reference to the village's former allegiance to the “Hinder” County of Sponheim, Oberamt of Birkenfeld. The charge in base on the sinister (armsbearer's left, viewer's right) side, known in German heraldry as a Dreiberg, is in part canting for the village's name, at least for the last syllable, for Berg means "mountain" in German, and it also refers to the village's high elevation and the Gebück mountain ridge. The wolf's head refers to the Wolfskaul, an area within municipal limits where there was once a wolf-catching pit.

The arms have been borne since 26 August 1963.

== Culture and sightseeing ==
=== Buildings ===
The following are listed buildings or sites in Rhineland-Palatinate's Directory of Cultural Monuments:

- Brückener Straße 2 – stately Quereinhaus (a combination residential and commercial house divided for these two purposes down the middle, perpendicularly to the street) with half-hipped roof, 1911
- Hauptstraße 10 – Quereinhaus, partly timber-frame (plastered), half-hipped roof, essentially possibly about 1800; gravel paving; walled gardens
- Hochwaldstraße 32 – former school; building with mansard roof and turret typical of its time, 1913

== Economy and infrastructure ==
=== Transport ===
To the east runs Bundesstraße 269, and to the south runs the Autobahn A 62 (Kaiserslautern–Trier). Serving nearby Neubrücke is a railway station on the Nahe Valley Railway.
