= Niederbrombach =

- Municipality
- Coat of arms

- Location of Niederbrombach within Birkenfeld district
- Interactive map of Niederbrombach
- Location within Germany Location within Rhineland-Palatinate
- Coordinates: 49°41′19″N 07°14′56″E
- Country: Germany
- State: Rhineland-Palatinate
- District: Birkenfeld
- Municipal assoc.: Birkenfeld

Government
  - Mayor (2019–24): Bernd Brombacher

Area
  - Total: 7.28 km^{2} (2.81 sq mi)
- Elevation: 430 m (1,410 ft)

Population (2025-12-31)
  - Total: 493
  - Density: 67.7/km^{2} (175/sq mi)
- Time zone: UTC+01:00 (CET)
  - Summer (DST): UTC+02:00 (CEST)
- Postal codes: 55767
- Dialling codes: 06787
- Vehicle registration: BIR
- Website: www.gemeinde-niederbrombach.de

Niederbrombach is an Ortsgemeinde – a municipality belonging to a Verbandsgemeinde, a kind of collective municipality – in the Birkenfeld district in Rhineland-Palatinate, Germany. It belongs to the Verbandsgemeinde of Birkenfeld, whose seat is in the like-named town.

== Geography ==
=== Location ===
The municipality lies on a bend in a dale on the road between Birkenfeld and Idar-Oberstein. Indeed, four dales meet at Niederbrombach, one each coming from north, south, east and west. Also coming down three of those dales are streams, the Hambach, the Schwollbach and the Rothenbach. All three flow together at the hollow formed by the junction of the four dales and thereafter flow as one stream, called the Schwollbach, down to Kronweiler, where the Schwollbach empties into the river Nahe.

Set above the dales are some peaks. North of Niederbrombach are the Hömelskopf and the Heidkopf, to the east are the Pferdshöhe and the Brombacher Höhe, to the south are the Rothenbachberg, the Winnenberg and the Hochkastell and finally, to the west are the Kleb and the Bauterskopf.

=== Constituent communities ===
Also belonging to Niederbrombach are the outlying homesteads of Fischerhof, Haus Manzenbach, Lärchenhof and Robinienhof.

== History ==
The oldest forms of the village's name found in documents are Brambach and Branbach. Only in more recent times has Niederbrombach been distinguished from Oberbrombach.

Branbach, along with its subjects and its church, passed from Duke-Archbishop Liutwin's ownership to Saint Paulinus's Foundation in Trier about 700. Almost three centuries later, in 981, it passed to the Archiepiscopal Foundation of Trier. Brombach was the main centre of the Electoral-Trier holdings (later Sponheim holdings) south of the Idar Forest, and within the high court region and the Amtsbezirk, Brombach had become and remained the main centre of its own feudal domain (Großbann), its own Pflege (literally “care”, but actually a local geopolitical unit) and its own parish. Secular and ecclesiastical holdings matched one another so fully that in the 18th century, the term “parish” was also used to designate the administrative region. As the Middle Ages wore on, the Großbann underwent increasing disintegration due to continuing settlement. First, in the Early Middle Ages, came a partition into two, which was then followed much later – in the 18th century – by an ecclesiastical partition along the same lines.

Under French rule from 1797 to 1814, the former “administrative parish” became a mairie (“mayoralty”). From 1815 to 1817, the Brombach Pflege was Prussian, from 1817 to 1937 part of Oldenburg, and for the rest of the Third Reich's time in power, Prussian again. This ended with the onset of Allied occupation after the Second World War. Since 1946, Niederbrombach has been part of the then newly founded state of Rhineland-Palatinate.

== Politics ==
=== Municipal council ===
The council is made up of 8 council members, who were elected by majority vote at the municipal election held on 25 May 2014, and the honorary mayor as chairman.

=== Mayor ===
Niederbrombach's mayor is Bernd Brombacher, and his deputies are Christoph Ruppenthal and Volker Röhrig.

=== Coat of arms ===
The German blazon reads: Unter rot-silbern geschachtem Schildhaupt in Gold zwei rundbogige schwarze Arkaden.

The municipality's arms might in English heraldic language be described thus: Or a double arch sable, the chief countercompony gules and argent.

The chief is a reference to the village's former allegiance to the “Hinder” County of Sponheim, which bore arms chequy gules and argent. Niederbrombach was in the Sponheim Oberamt of Birkenfeld. The arches represent the village's old parish church. This was donated by Archbishop Liutwin of Trier to Saint Paulinus's Foundation in Trier, which quite likely founded the church.

The arms have been borne since 20 August 1965.

== Culture and sightseeing ==
=== Buildings ===
The following are listed buildings or sites in Rhineland-Palatinate’s Directory of Cultural Monuments:

- Evangelical church, Herrengasse 12 – formerly Saint Mary Magdalene’s (Heilige Maria Magdalena), west tower, south aisle and quire from the 14th century, north aisle (partly?) Romanesque, twin nave and all vaulting from the 15th century; thorough restoration 1911, architect August Senz, Düsseldorf; renovation work 1963/1964, architect Otto Vogel, Trier; six tomb slabs, 16th and 17th centuries; seven sarcophagi, possibly from the 11th and 12th centuries
- Fels 21 – former gristmill (Brüchers Mühle); one-floor, later built higher, quarrystone building, 1876, marked 1720 (possibly spolia); technical equipment partly preserved
- Hauptstraße – fountain; Renaissance Revival fountain column, cast-iron trough (Asbach Ironworks?) with relief, marked 1888
- Herrengasse 10, 12, 14 (monumental zone) – group of buildings consisting of a church, two rectories and a parish barn above terrace walls, 18th century
- Lindenstraße 2 – Quereinhaus (a combination residential and commercial house divided for these two purposes down the middle, perpendicularly to the street), earlier half of the 19th century
- Unter Hochcastell 4 – residential and professional house, melaphyre quarrystone building with timber-frame knee wall, round tower, Swiss chalet style, 1927
- So-called Fischerhof, south of the village – prototype estate, begun 1833; formerly a four-wing complex with five-axis house, livestock stables, shed and servants’ house (this last torn down in 1976); house converted about 1900; terraced garden, staircase with fountain, relocated Catholic chapel
- So-called Obere Auschleife, south of the village on the Schwollbach – former complex with undershot waterwheels, 1828; small timber-frame building, partly solid (former agate-grinding workshop), pond and small reservoir

== Economy and infrastructure ==
=== Infrastructure ===
Available in Niederbrombach are many shops, banks, craft workshops, inns, a medical practice, a primary school, a Hauptschule functioning as a regional school with a sport hall, a kindergarten and an outdoor sport complex near the school, making the municipality self-sufficient in infrastructure.

=== Transport ===
Running through the village is Bundesstraße 41, which towards the south leads to the Autobahn A 62 (Kaiserslautern–Trier). Serving nearby Kronweiler is a railway station on the Nahe Valley Railway (Bingen–Saarbrücken).

== Famous people ==
The famous astrologer Johannes Lichtenberger worked as a clergyman in Brambach, as Niederbrombach was then called, until his death about 1503.
