= Allenbach =

- Municipality
- Coat of arms

- Location of Allenbach within Birkenfeld district
- Interactive map of Allenbach
- Location within Germany Location within Rhineland-Palatinate
- Coordinates: 49°45′20″N 07°09′57″E
- Country: Germany
- State: Rhineland-Palatinate
- District: Birkenfeld
- Municipal assoc.: Herrstein-Rhaunen

Government
  - Mayor (2019–24): Siegfried Burmann

Area
  - Total: 27.7 km^{2} (10.7 sq mi)
- Elevation: 478 m (1,568 ft)

Population (2025-12-31)
  - Total: 656
  - Density: 23.7/km^{2} (61.3/sq mi)
- Time zone: UTC+01:00 (CET)
  - Summer (DST): UTC+02:00 (CEST)
- Postal codes: 55758
- Dialling codes: 06786
- Vehicle registration: BIR
- Website: www.allenbach-hunsrueck.de

Allenbach (German pronunciation: [ˈalənbax]) is an Ortsgemeinde – a municipality belonging to a Verbandsgemeinde, a kind of collective municipality – in the Birkenfeld district in Rhineland-Palatinate, Germany. It belongs to the Verbandsgemeinde Herrstein-Rhaunen, whose seat is in Herrstein.

== Geography ==
=== Location ===
The municipality lies in the Schwarzwälder Hochwald (forest) in the Hunsrück, roughly 14 km northwest of Idar-Oberstein and 12 km north of Birkenfeld.

=== Constituent communities ===
Also belonging to Allenbach is the homestead of Hüttgeswasen.

== History ==
In 1265, Allenbach had its first documentary mention as Ellenbach. At that time, it belonged to the County of Sponheim. In 1601, the Allenbacher Schloss (residential castle) was built through the conversion of the old Castle Ellenburg, and this still stands in the middle of the village today. In February 1898, the castle was bought by a salesman from Idar named Max Purper. Near the castle stands the Evangelical Castle Church, which since 1832 has housed a Stumm organ. Until administrative restructuring in Rhineland-Palatinate in 1969, this Hunsrück village belonged to the now abolished Bernkastel district, whose seat was at Bernkastel-Kues.

For 12 years, the Hüttgeswasen homestead at Allenbach was home to Johann Peter Petri, better known as Schwarzer Peter (“Black Peter”). He was a lumberjack and a charcoal maker, but also earned notoriety as a robber, becoming outlaw Schinderhannes’s (Johannes Bückler’s) sidekick. It is said that in prison, he devised the game Schwarzer Peter, which is much like old maid.

== Politics ==
=== Municipal council ===
The council is made up of 12 council members, who were elected by majority vote at the municipal election held on 7 June 2009, and the honorary mayor as chairman.

=== Mayors ===
The Mayor’s office, bearing the title Ortsvorsteher until 1932 and Ortsbürgermeister since, has been held by the following persons:

- 1892–1912 F. Näher
- 1912–1916 K. Keßler
- 1928–1932 J. Purper
- 1932–1945 K. Müller
- 1945–1946 W. Fuchs
- 1946–1947 K. Schmidt
- 1948–1956 F. Röper
- 1956–1960 A. Cullmann
- 1960–1974 O. Paulus
- 1974–2004 E. Steuer
- 2004– Siegfried Burmann

=== Coat of arms ===
The German blazon reads: In schräglinks geteiltem Schild vorne in Blau eine goldene Burg mit schwarzen Fenstern und einer Tür, aus der ein zweigeteilter silberner Wellenbalken zeigt, hinten rot-silbernes Schach.

The municipality’s arms might in English heraldic language be described thus: Per bend sinister azure a castle Or with windows and door sable, issuant from the door a bend and a bend sinister, both wavy, argent, and chequy gules and argent.

The charge on the dexter (armsbearer’s right, viewer’s left) side, the castle, is a device seen in Allenbach’s old 18th-century seal, while the “chequy” pattern on the sinister (armsbearer's left, viewer's right) side is a reference to the village's former allegiance to the “Hinder” County of Sponheim.

== Culture and sightseeing ==
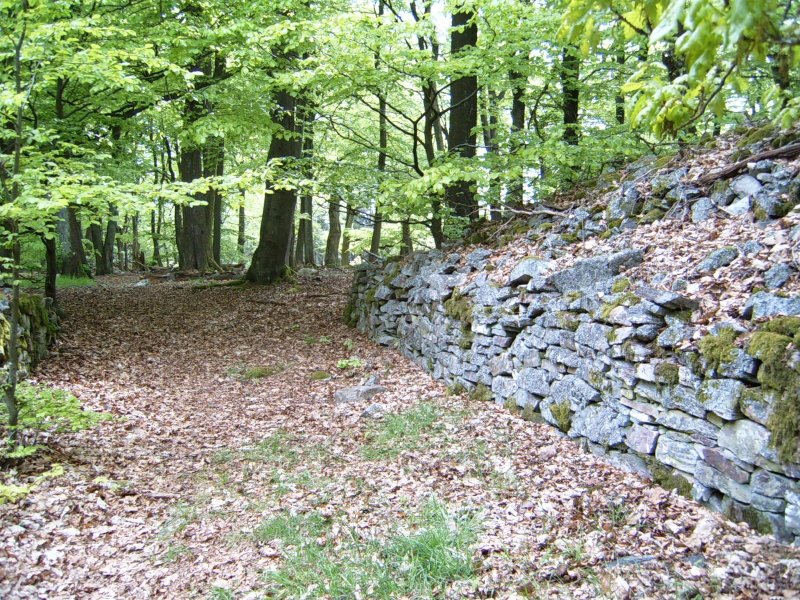
Entrance to ringwall near Allenbach

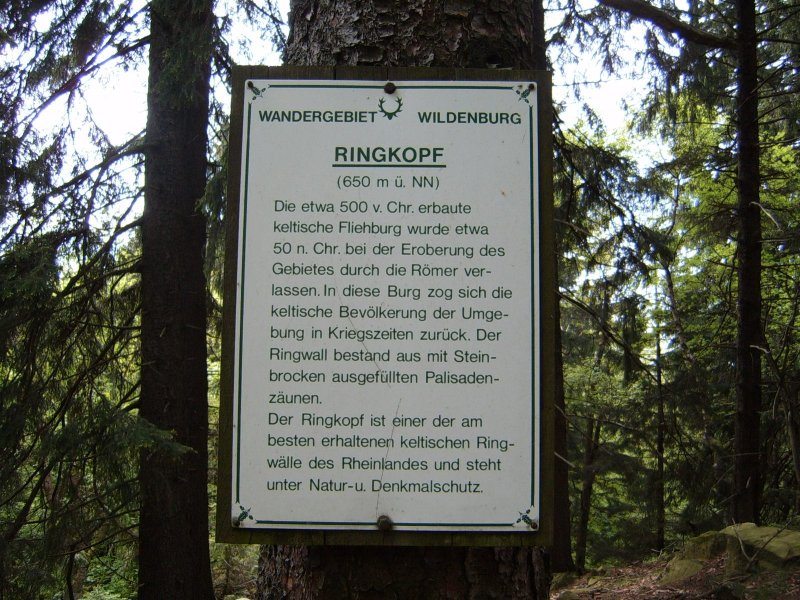
Ringwall information

=== Buildings ===
The following are listed buildings or sites in Rhineland-Palatinate’s Directory of Cultural Monuments:

- Hauptstraße 50 – Evangelical church; aisleless church with ridge turret, 1780/81, architect Friedrich Gerhard Wahl, Zweibrücken; décor
- Hauptstraße 8 – forest house; small building with mansard roof, partly clad in wood or slates, first fourth of the 20th century
- Hauptstraße 46 – stately house, partly slated, half-hipped roof, marked 1743
- Hauptstraße 62 – house with stable on ground floor, partly slated, about 1900
- In der Hintergasse 4 – stately commercial building; three-rowed stable, roomy barn with bonded roof, marked 1864
- In der Schied 11 – miller's equipment and dwelling, 19th century
- In der Schied 12 – former Sponheim residential castle; two- to three-floor building with hipped roof, essentially late mediaeval, altered several times, especially in 1511 and from 1898 to 1900, architects Wilhelm Müller and Franz Rummel, Frankfurt; characterizes village's appearance

==== Other sites ====
- Celtic wall complex on the Ringkopf near Allenbach
- Castle church at Allenbach in the middle of the village
- Historic gristmill
