= Rötsweiler-Nockenthal =

- Municipality
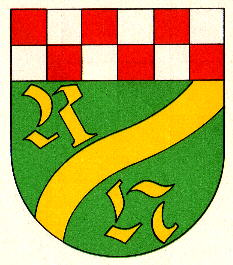
- Coat of arms

- Location of Rötsweiler-Nockenthal within Birkenfeld district
- Interactive map of Rötsweiler-Nockenthal
- Location within Germany Location within Rhineland-Palatinate
- Coordinates: 49°42′52″N 7°15′43″E
- Country: Germany
- State: Rhineland-Palatinate
- District: Birkenfeld
- Municipal assoc.: Birkenfeld

Government
  - Mayor (2019–24): Joachim Rothfuchs

Area
  - Total: 3.21 km^{2} (1.24 sq mi)
- Elevation: 330 m (1,080 ft)

Population (2025-12-31)
  - Total: 458
  - Density: 143/km^{2} (370/sq mi)
- Time zone: UTC+01:00 (CET)
  - Summer (DST): UTC+02:00 (CEST)
- Postal codes: 55767
- Dialling codes: 06787
- Vehicle registration: BIR

Rötsweiler-Nockenthal is an Ortsgemeinde – a municipality belonging to a Verbandsgemeinde, a kind of collective municipality – in the Birkenfeld district in Rhineland-Palatinate, Germany. It belongs to the Verbandsgemeinde of Birkenfeld, whose seat is in the like-named town.

== Geography ==
=== Location ===
Rötsweiler-Nockenthal is a double municipality – it has two centres – and it lies on the southwest slope of the Hunsrück. Nockenthal lies on the Fleischbach, while Rötsweiler lies on the Aschbach. Just to the east lies Idar-Oberstein’s outlying centre of Algenrodt. The municipality lies roughly halfway between Saarbrücken and Bad Kreuznach.

=== Constituent communities ===
Rötsweiler-Nockenthal’s Ortsteile are Nockenthal and Rötsweiler.

== History ==
In 1324, Nockenthal had its first documentary mention as Nockendail, while Rötsweiler had its first documentary mention as Rezwiler in 1429. As part of the Principality of Birkenfeld, the two villages both belonged to the Grand Duchy of Oldenburg, most of whose territory was in what is now northwest Germany, with a coastline on the North Sea (the Principality was an exclave). This had been set forth by the Congress of Vienna in 1815, in the wake of Napoleon’s downfall. The villages remained as part of Oldenburg for the rest of the 19th century, right through Imperial times, the First World War, Weimar times (although by now, Oldenburg had ceased to be a monarchical state) and even into the time of the Third Reich, when in 1937, the former Principality of Birkenfeld was merged into Prussia. By this time, the administrative merger of the two villages of Nockenthal and Rötsweiler had taken place. It happened in 1933, after the Nazis had come to power in Oldenburg, which itself had happened some months before Adolf Hitler himself had seized power in Germany as a whole. Before the amalgamation, Nockenthal and Rötsweiler had each been self-administering municipalities.

== Politics ==
=== Municipal council ===
The council is made up of 8 council members, who were elected by majority vote at the municipal election held on 7 June 2009, and the honorary mayor as chairman.

=== Mayor ===
Rötsweiler-Nockenthal’s mayor is Joachim Rothfuchs.

=== Coat of arms ===
The municipality’s arms might be described thus: Vert a bend sinister wavy of one between the letters R and N, all Or, the chief countercompony gules and argent.

== Culture and sightseeing ==
=== Buildings ===
The following are listed buildings or sites in Rhineland-Palatinate’s Directory of Cultural Monuments:

==== Nockenthal ====
- Talstraße 2 – Quereinhaus (a combination residential and commercial house divided for these two purposes down the middle, perpendicularly to the street), marked 1815

==== Rötsweiler ====
- Schulstraße 5 – farmstead, two-floor house with eaves forward, commercial wing with gable forward, mid 19th century

== Economy and infrastructure ==
Running through the municipality is Bundesstraße 41, which towards the south leads to the Autobahn A 62 (Kaiserslautern–Trier). In nearby Idar-Oberstein, the railway station, as a Regional-Express and Regionalbahn stop, is linked by way of the Nahe Valley Railway (Bingen–Saarbrücken) to the Saarland and the Frankfurt Rhine Main Region. The Rhein-Nahe-Express running the Mainz-Saarbrücken route serves the station hourly. Every other train goes through to the main railway station in Frankfurt with a stop at Frankfurt Airport. Formerly, fast trains on the Frankfurt-Paris route had a stop at Idar-Oberstein.
