= Oberhambach =

- Municipality
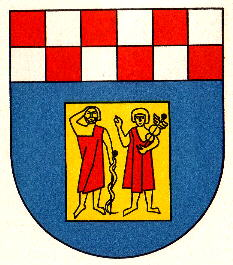
- Coat of arms

- Location of Oberhambach within Birkenfeld district
- Interactive map of Oberhambach
- Location within Germany Location within Rhineland-Palatinate
- Coordinates: 49°41′8.42″N 7°9′36.78″E
- Country: Germany
- State: Rhineland-Palatinate
- District: Birkenfeld
- Municipal assoc.: Birkenfeld

Government
  - Mayor (2019–24): Günter Stolz

Area
  - Total: 5.11 km^{2} (1.97 sq mi)
- Elevation: 412 m (1,352 ft)

Population (2025-12-31)
  - Total: 275
  - Density: 53.8/km^{2} (139/sq mi)
- Time zone: UTC+01:00 (CET)
  - Summer (DST): UTC+02:00 (CEST)
- Postal codes: 55765
- Dialling codes: 06782
- Vehicle registration: BIR
- Website: www.oberhambach.de

Oberhambach is an Ortsgemeinde – a municipality belonging to a Verbandsgemeinde, a kind of collective municipality – in the Birkenfeld district in Rhineland-Palatinate, Germany. It belongs to the Verbandsgemeinde of Birkenfeld, whose seat is in the like-named town.

Oberhambach is a tourism resort.

== Geography ==
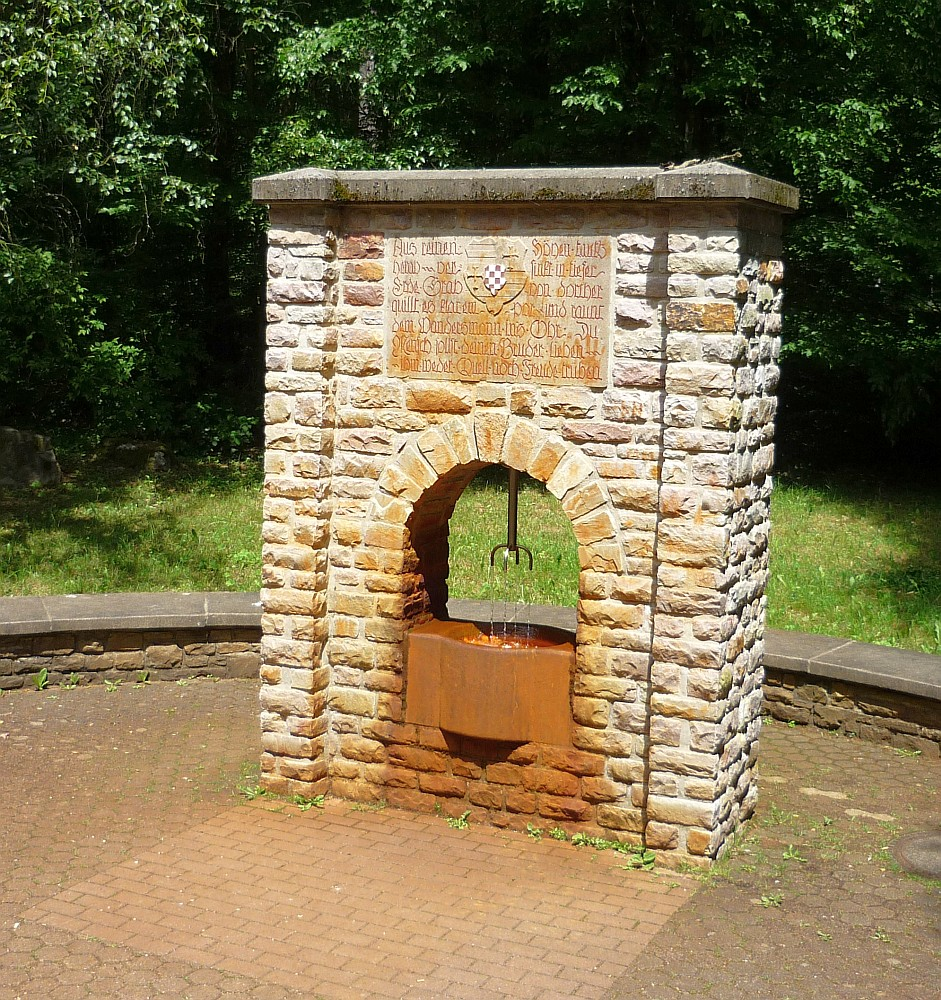
The Sauerbrunnen

The municipality lies on the Hambach in the Hunsrück. The municipal area is 57.5% wooded.

Not far outside the village, to the west, is the Sauerbrunnen (“Sour Spring”), a health spring known for many centuries now, and still a popular spot for an outing. The minerals lend the drinkable springwater a flavour all its own, and many people come to drink it.

== Politics ==
=== Municipal council ===
The council is made up of 8 council members, who were elected by majority vote at the municipal election held on 7 June 2009, and the honorary mayor as chairman.

=== Mayor ===
Oberhambach's mayor is Günter Stolz.

=== Coat of arms ===
The German blazon reads: Unter rot-silbern geschachtem Schildhaupt in Blau ein goldenes Rechteck, darin zwei rotgewandete Figuren, die Aeskulap und Merkur darstellen.

The municipality's arms might in English heraldic language be described thus: Azure a block Or charged with figures of Aesculapius and Mercury of the same vested gules. the chief countercompony gules and argent.

The chief is a reference to the village's former allegiance to the “Hinder” County of Sponheim, which bore arms chequy gules and argent. Oberhambach was in the Sponheim Oberamt of Birkenfeld. The charge on the blue field is a simplified depiction of a Roman “eight-god stone” – now kept at the Birkenfeld local history museum – found near the Sauerbrunnen. Aesculapius especially supposedly refers to the spring, whose healing waters have been known for centuries.

The arms have been borne since 15 June 1965.

== Culture and sightseeing ==
=== Buildings ===
The following are listed buildings or sites in Rhineland-Palatinate’s Directory of Cultural Monuments:

- At Hauptstraße 2 – doorway with skylight, about 1700
