= Kronweiler =

- Municipality
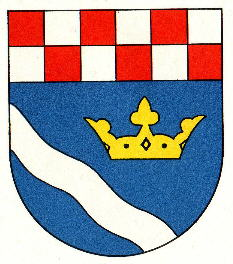
- Coat of arms

- Location of Kronweiler within Birkenfeld district
- Interactive map of Kronweiler
- Location within Germany Location within Rhineland-Palatinate
- Coordinates: 49°39′30.80″N 7°15′43.94″E
- Country: Germany
- State: Rhineland-Palatinate
- District: Birkenfeld
- Municipal assoc.: Birkenfeld

Government
  - Mayor (2019–24): Jochen Bier

Area
  - Total: 3.51 km^{2} (1.36 sq mi)
- Elevation: 300 m (980 ft)

Population (2025-12-31)
  - Total: 310
  - Density: 88/km^{2} (230/sq mi)
- Time zone: UTC+01:00 (CET)
  - Summer (DST): UTC+02:00 (CEST)
- Postal codes: 55767
- Dialling codes: 06787
- Vehicle registration: BIR

Kronweiler is an Ortsgemeinde – a municipality belonging to a Verbandsgemeinde, a kind of collective municipality – in the Birkenfeld district in Rhineland-Palatinate, Germany. It belongs to the Verbandsgemeinde of Birkenfeld, whose seat is in the like-named town.

== Geography ==
=== Location ===
The municipality lies on the upper reaches of the river Nahe in the southwestern Hunsrück. Within the municipality, the Schwollbach, which flows down from the Idar Forest empties into the Nahe.

=== Constituent communities ===
Also belonging to Kronweiler are the outlying centre of Hangelbösch and the homestead of Alte Schleife.

== History ==
In 1360, Kronweiler had its first documentary mention. It was part of the “Hinder” County of Sponheim.

== Politics ==
=== Municipal council ===
The council is made up of 8 council members, who were elected by majority vote at the municipal election held on 7 June 2009, and the honorary mayor as chairman.

=== Coat of arms ===
The German blazon reads: Unter rot-silbern geschachtem Schildhaupt in Blau ein silberner Wellenschrägbalken, darüber eine goldene Krone.

The municipality’s arms might in English heraldic language be described thus: Under a chief countercompony gules and argent azure a bend wavy to dexter of the second above which a crown Or.

The arms have been borne since 1964.

== Culture and sightseeing ==
=== Buildings ===
The following are listed buildings or sites in Rhineland-Palatinate’s Directory of Cultural Monuments:

- Sacred Heart Catholic Church (Kirche Herz Jesu), Hauptstraße/corner of Am Bahnhof – small Gothic Revival aisleless church with ridge turret, 1910, architect Martin, Düsseldorf; Late Baroque décor
- Am Bahnhof 3 – former railway station on the Rhein-Nahe-Bahn with ticket hall, stationmaster’s apartment and waiting room; two-floor yellow sandstone building with low additions, 1868, north addition 1910
- Hauptstraße – two-arch bridge over the Schwollbach, 1880s
- Railway bridges on the Rhein-Nahe-Bahn, east and southeast of the village – two three-arch, brick-framed sandstone block structures over the Nahe
- Warriors’ memorial 1914/1918, on village western outskirts, on the “Hemelchen” – memorial to the twelve citizens from Kronweiler who fell in the First World War, sandstone stele with sculpture of a soldier in a grove of thujas, 1925

== Economy and infrastructure ==
=== Transport ===
Running by to the northwest is Bundesstraße 41, and to the south, the Autobahn A 62 (Kaiserslautern–Trier). Kronweiler also has a railway station on the Nahe Valley Railway (Bingen–Saarbrücken).
