= Brücken, Birkenfeld =

Brücken
- Municipality
- Coat of arms

- Location of Brücken within Birkenfeld district
- Interactive map of Brücken
- Location within Germany Location within Rhineland-Palatinate
- Coordinates: 49°38′16.40″N 7°6′41.41″E
- Country: Germany
- State: Rhineland-Palatinate
- District: Birkenfeld
- Municipal assoc.: Birkenfeld
- Subdivisions: 2

Government
  - Mayor (2019–24): Marc Arend

Area
  - Total: 13.66 km^{2} (5.27 sq mi)
- Elevation: 405 m (1,329 ft)

Population (2025-12-31)
  - Total: 1,225
  - Density: 89.68/km^{2} (232.3/sq mi)
- Time zone: UTC+01:00 (CET)
  - Summer (DST): UTC+02:00 (CEST)
- Postal codes: 55767
- Dialling codes: 06782
- Vehicle registration: BIR
- Website: www.bruecken-nahe.de/

Brücken (German pronunciation: [ˈbʁʏkn̩]) is an Ortsgemeinde – a municipality belonging to a Verbandsgemeinde, a kind of collective municipality – in the Birkenfeld district in Rhineland-Palatinate, Germany. It belongs to the Verbandsgemeinde of Birkenfeld, whose seat is in the like-named town.

== Geography ==
=== Location ===
The municipality lies on the Traunbach in the Schwarzwälder Hochwald (forest) in the Hunsrück. The municipal area is 62.3% wooded. Within Brücken's limits, on the Friedrichskopf, rises the Allbach, whose upper reaches bear the name Königsbach. Six kilometres to the west of Brücken lies the Saarland. Together with the outlying centre of Traunen, which was merged with the municipality in 1934, the population is almost 1,300.

=== Constituent communities ===
The municipality's Ortsteile are Brücken (main centre) and Traunen. Also belonging to Brücken is the outlying homestead of Friesenhof.

=== Climate ===
Yearly precipitation in Brücken amounts to 1 021 mm, which is very high, falling into the highest fourth of the precipitation chart for all Germany. At 86% of the German Weather Service's weather stations, lower figures are recorded. The driest month is July. The most rainfall comes in December. In that month, precipitation is 1.8 times what it is in July. Precipitation varies greatly. Only at 18% of the weather stations are higher seasonal swings recorded.

== History ==
Dating from as early as the late Bronze Age in the 1st millennium BC, the so-called New Hallstatt times, are some potsherds and parts of metal torcs found near what is now Brücken, which suggests that there was a settlement along the Middle Traunbach at the time. Whether it was a permanent one cannot be determined. This settlement might have been built on the important trade road that crossed the Traunbach near Brücken. Such crossings – bridges or fords – are well known to have been favourite locations for settlements.

Brücken grew out of a fishing village that was established right on the Traunbach. Inglinheim, as it was called, was named about 1200 in a directory of holdings from the church in Trier when four fishermen, who fished on the Traunbach for the Bishop of Trier, settled there.

Almost as long ago was Traunen's first documentary mention in a document from the Vögte of Hunolstein in 1256. Traunen always belonged to the Pflege (literally “care”, but actually a local geopolitical unit) of Achtelsbach and was until its amalgamation with Brücken in 1934 a self-administering municipality. Besides Traunen, there have been other homesteads and lesser centres that stood in what is now Brücken, among others the homestead of Ruppenthal, which lay at the forks of the Laienfloß and Götzenbach, the homestead of Hinzhausen at the foot of the Schwarzwälder Hochwald (forest) and Uffhofen, whose location is now uncertain. Hinzhausen is the subject of a local legend (see below).

Brücken itself had its first documentary mention in a document from a neighbouring municipality in 1324. One of the villagers, named Henrich bei der Brucke, was named as a witness and a bondsman, but the document does not go into further details.

The village of Brücken could not have been very big, for a 1437 compilation for the County of Sponheim listed only two people there who were subject to taxation. Even years later, in 1465, a taxation register still only listed two people who had to pay interest. Thereafter, however, the population rose steadily, reaching eight households by 1500 and swallowing up the homesteads mentioned above.

The village's importance and size kept growing through the decades that followed, leading the villagers to put forth as early as 1584 their first Dorfordnung (“village order”), which was reviewed and expanded in 1612. This democratically governed the villagers’ coexistence, with the express approval of the authorities. The population growth can only be understood against the backdrop of the favourable economic conditions. Besides agriculture and small craft businesses, several mills contributed to the upswing.

The Thirty Years' War took a heavy toll on Brücken, as it did elsewhere in Germany, reducing the population, bringing the economy to a halt and tearing great gaps in all aspects of life. Only a third of the villagers survived; some neighbouring villages were depopulated completely.

The 18th and 19th centuries once more brought a certain level of economic health to the villages, although economic wealth did not come overnight. Reasons for this could be seen in improvements to agriculture and forestry, the distribution of former lordly and communally held lands to the peasants and also in an emerging handicraft industry. In 1861, for the first time, an industrial operation located in Brücken. Wood charcoal, tar, wood vinegar and other chemicals were manufactured. Serving as raw material were the surrounding forests. While some found work at the plant, local farmers also found extra earning opportunities in transporting goods or hewing wood. Brücken grew into one of the biggest villages in the Birkenfelder Land.

Having a great number of children, as many local families did in the 18th and 19th centuries, was not always a blessing, bringing along with it economic and, not least of all, social problems. Not everyone could find a job in the village, and so some had to move away. Germany's new industrialization needed a workforce, while settlers were what was wanted in North and South America and Eastern Europe. Many of the inhabitants had no choice but to seek their fortunes in faraway lands.

The First and Second World Wars ravaged families with their heavy toll. Almost every family lost somebody. Those who survived were marked for life.

The most recent decades have brought considerable economic and technical advancement in all areas of life. Nonetheless, things of value have been lost. Today, Brücken, once characterized by agriculture, is a residential community most of whose inhabitants commute to jobs elsewhere, for there are not enough jobs in the municipality itself.

Brücken is known for the legend of Hinzhausen. According to this, there was a village in the forest that was stricken with the Plague. After long pondering what should be done, the surviving villagers decided to barricade their village from the inside and burn everything to the ground, thereby sparing all villages around them the horror that they had faced. It is said that the destroyed village's ruins can still be seen in the middle of the forest near Brücken. These ruins actually do exist, although it is unknown whether they are actually what is left of the tragic, Plague-stricken village of Hinzhausen.

=== Village’s name ===
The name “Brücken” refers to the bridges – Brücken literally means “bridges” in German – that have to be crossed to reach the village centre.

== Politics ==
=== Municipal council ===
The council is made up of 16 council members, who were elected by proportional representation at the municipal election held on 7 June 2009, and the honorary mayor as chairman.

The municipal election held on 7 June 2009 yielded the following results:

Year	SPD	CDU	WGR	Total
2009	6	2	8	16 seats
2004	4	3	9	16 seats

=== Mayors ===
Brücken's mayor is Marc Arend. Since 1946, there have only been four mayors:

- 1946–1949: Adolf Schöpfer
- 1949–1974: Johann Mörsdorf
- 1974–2019: Karl-Otto Engel
- 2019–: Marc Arend

=== Coat of arms ===
The German blazon reads: Unter dreifach eingebogenem goldenem Schildhaupt schräglinks geteilter Schild, vorne rot-silbernes Schach, hinten in Schwarz ein wachsender rotbewehrter, -gezungter und -gekrönter goldener Löwe.

The municipality's arms might in English heraldic language be described thus: Under a chief engrailed of three Or party per bend sinister chequy of gules and argent and sable issuant from base sinister a demilion of the first armed, langued and crowned of the second.

The chief with its lower edge “engrailed” (that is, with a “serrated” edge) is meant to resemble the bridge that joins Traunen to Brücken's main centre, and thus is also canting for the municipality's name, which means “Bridges”. The charges in the two fields below are references to Brücken's and Traunen's former allegiances to the “Hinder” County of Sponheim, represented by the “chequy” pattern on the dexter (armsbearer's right, viewer's left) side, and the Duchy of Palatinate-Zweibrücken, represented by the demilion on the sinister (armsbearer's left, viewer's right) side, respectively.

The arms have been borne since 8 November 1963.

== Culture and sightseeing ==
=== Buildings ===
The following are listed buildings or sites in Rhineland-Palatinate’s Directory of Cultural Monuments:

==== Brücken (main centre) ====
- An der Warth 2 – estate complex along the street, partly timber-frame, partly slated, latter half of the 19th century, essentially possibly older
- Apfelbüscherstraße 2 – estate complex along the street: one-floor dwelling wing with knee wall, mainly timber-frame; two-floor commercial wing, partly timber-frame, dwelling rooms possibly not as old, about 1870
- Within Apfelbüscherstraße 6 – smithy; in the west part of the former craftsman’s house, workshop room completely outfitted
- Römerweg 6 – Fettigs Mühle (mill); complex of two dwelling buildings: west one with a barn wing marked 1856, two rows of ventilation dormers, east one with partly preserved mill installation; waterwheel
- Trierer Straße 19 – Schwesternhaus, building with gable roof, typical for its time, spire light, 1913
- Trierer Straße 46 – former school; seven-axis Classicist plastered building with ridge turret, 1848
- Trierer Straße 53 – house with vroof with complex design, before 1914

==== Traunen ====
- Brunnenstraße – Doppelbrunnen (“Double Fountain”), two cast-iron troughs, marked 1890, possibly from the Asbach Ironworks
- Brunnenstraße 9 – Quereinhaus (a combination residential and commercial house divided for these two purposes down the middle, perpendicularly to the street), marked 1821; Classicist garden enclosure, about 1820

=== Regular events ===
Each year, two village festivals are held in Brücken. The Frühlingsfest (“Spring Festival”), attended mostly by local people, and the Glockenkirmes (“Bell Fair”), which attracts visitors from outside the municipality.

Brücken is also well known for its Carnival (locally Fastnacht) events. This celebration enjoys such popularity that the events are scheduled over two evenings.

== Economy and infrastructure ==
Brücken has a primary school and a kindergarten. These are also attended by children from surrounding municipalities.

Brücken also has a big fairground, a village museum, a community centre and a gymnasium. The football club FC Brücken has at its disposal a cinder pitch and a grass pitch, both right at the clubhouse. The municipality has a volunteer fire brigade, which contributes to youth work by running a youth fire brigade.
