= List of mountains and hills of the Saarland =

This List of mountains and hills of the Saarland shows a selection of mountains and hills in the German federal state of the Saarland and is listed by descending height in metres above sea level (NHN).

Name, Height, Location (nearby settlement)

1. Dollberg (695.4 m), north of Nonnweiler, Dollberge; Saarland/Rhineland-Palatinate border
2. Schimmelkopf (694.8 m), north of Weiskirchen, Schwarzwälder Hochwald; Saarland/Rhineland-Palatinate border
3. Trautzberg (c. 604 m), east of Freisen Saarland/Rhineland-Palatinate border
4. Hellerberg (596.3 m), east of Freisen
5. Füsselberg (595.1 m), south of Freisen
6. Peterberg (c. 584 m), south of Braunshausen
7. Weiselberg (569.5 m), west of Oberkirchen, North Palatine Uplands
8. Schaumberg (c. 569 m), northwest of Tholey, Prims-Blies Hills
9. Schankelberg (c. 550 m), north of Nonnweiler
10. Sparrenberg (c. 544 m) north of Freisen
11. Diegelsberg (537.2 m), southwest of Bosen
12. Felsenberg (c. 537 m), north of Wadrill, Black Forest Highlands
13. Schreck (c. 535 m), south of Nonnweiler
14. Höcherberg (c. 518 m), north of Höchen, North Palatine Uplands
15. Judenkopf (c. 517 m), north-northwest of Britten
16. Losenberg (512.5 m), northwest of Oberthal
17. Leißberg (512.4 m), north of Oberthal
18. Heidenkopf (507.8 m), south of Nohfelden
19. Momberg (499.4 m), northwest of Oberthal
20. Trausberg (c. 499 m), north of Dautweiler
21. Bosenberg (485.2 m), east-northeast of St. Wendel
22. Buberg (465.8 m), northeast of Bubach
23. Göttelborner Höhe (443.2 m), west-southwest of Göttelborn
24. Kewelsberg (441.8 m), south-southwest of Tünsdorf
25. Kehrberg (438.7 m), west of Marth
26. Litermont (414.2 m), north of Nalbach
27. Leuker Kopf (c. 414 m), northwest of Keuchingen
28. Hoxberg (413.6 m), southwest of Lebach
29. Monte Schlacko (403.5 m), east of Püttlingen
30. Betzentaler Berg (402.3 m), south of Sankt Ingbert
31. Spiemont (c. 402 m), north of Niederlinxweiler, North Palatine Uplands
32. Galgenberg (401.1 m), south of Losheim
33. Großer Kahlenberg (401.1 m), west-northwest of Böckweiler
34. Großer Stiefel (397.2 m), west of Sengscheid
35. Hungerkopf (c. 396 m), northeast of Mettlach
36. Hölschberg (394.8 m), east-northeast of Erfweiler-Ehlingen
37. Totenkopf (387.0 m), east of Niedergailbach, Bliesgau
38. Alteberg (385.1 m), east of Büdingen
39. Einöder Höhe (c. 382 m), east of Einöd
40. Hirschberg (380.6 m), east of Kirkel
41. Sauberg (377.3 m), west of Altforweiler
42. Hoher Kopf (377.1 m), northeast of Kirkel
43. Schwarzenberg (c. 377 m), west of Saarbrücken-Scheidt
44. Gipsberg (c. 373 m), northwest of Merchingen
45. Kahlenberg (372.0 m), southeast of St. Ingbert, Sankt Ingbert-Kirkel Forest Region
46. Klosterberg (370.0 m), northeast of Bierbach, Sankt Ingbert-Kirkel Forest Region
47. Karlsberg (c. 366 m), east-northeast of Sanddorf
48. Wickersberg (361.4 m), west of Saarbrücken-Ensheim
49. Brennender Berg (c. 360 m), west of Saarbrücken-Dudweiler
50. Schlossberg (Homburg) (c. 325 m), east of the old town of Homburg
51. Schlossberg (Kirkel) (c. 307 m), in the centre of Kirkel
52. Winterberg (300.9 m), east-southeast of the city centre of Saarbrücken
53. Halberg (266.0 m), southeast of the city of Saarbrücken
54. Kaninchenberg (265.4 m), east-southeast of the city centre of Saarbrücken

== See also ==
- List of the highest mountains in Germany
- List of the highest mountains in the German states
- List of mountain and hill ranges in Germany
