= Friedrichskopf (Dollberge) =

- Location within Rhineland-Palatinate

Highest point
- Elevation: 707.4 m above sea level (NHN) (2,321 ft)
- Coordinates: 49°39′36″N 7°03′36″E

Geography
- Location: near Brücken; Birkenfeld, Rhineland-Palatinate, Germany
- Parent range: Dollberge (Hunsrück)

The Friedrichskopf near Brücken in the county of Birkenfeld in the German state of Rhineland-Palatinate is 707.4 m above sea level (NHN) and the highest mountain in the Dollberge, a small range in the Schwarzwälder Hochwald region of the Hunsrück mountains.

== Geography ==
=== Location ===
The Friedrichskopf rises in the Saar-Hunsrück Nature Park on the territory of Brücken, a village which is 4.4 km southeast of the summit. About 2 km north-northwest is Muhl (in the neighbouring county of Trier-Saarburg), 3.3 km east-southeast of Abentheuer, 2.7 km southwest of Zinsershütten and 3.5 km north-northeast of Börfink. On the southern slopes of the mountain rises the Bleidenbach, a tributary of the Traunbach. The source of the Allbach, which feeds the Prims, is on its western mountainside.

Parts of the protected area (Landschaftsschutzgebiet or LSG) of Hochwald-Idarwald mit Randgebieten (CDDA-No. 321654; designated in 1976, 471.8224 km² in area) lie on the Friedrichskopf.

=== Natural regions ===
The Friedrichskopf is part of the natural regional major unit group of Hunsrück (No. 24), in the major unit of Hochwald and Idar Forest (242), subunit of the Schwarzwälder Hochwald (242.0) and natural region of the Dollberge and Herrstein Forest (242.02).
