= Dollberg =

Mountain in Germany

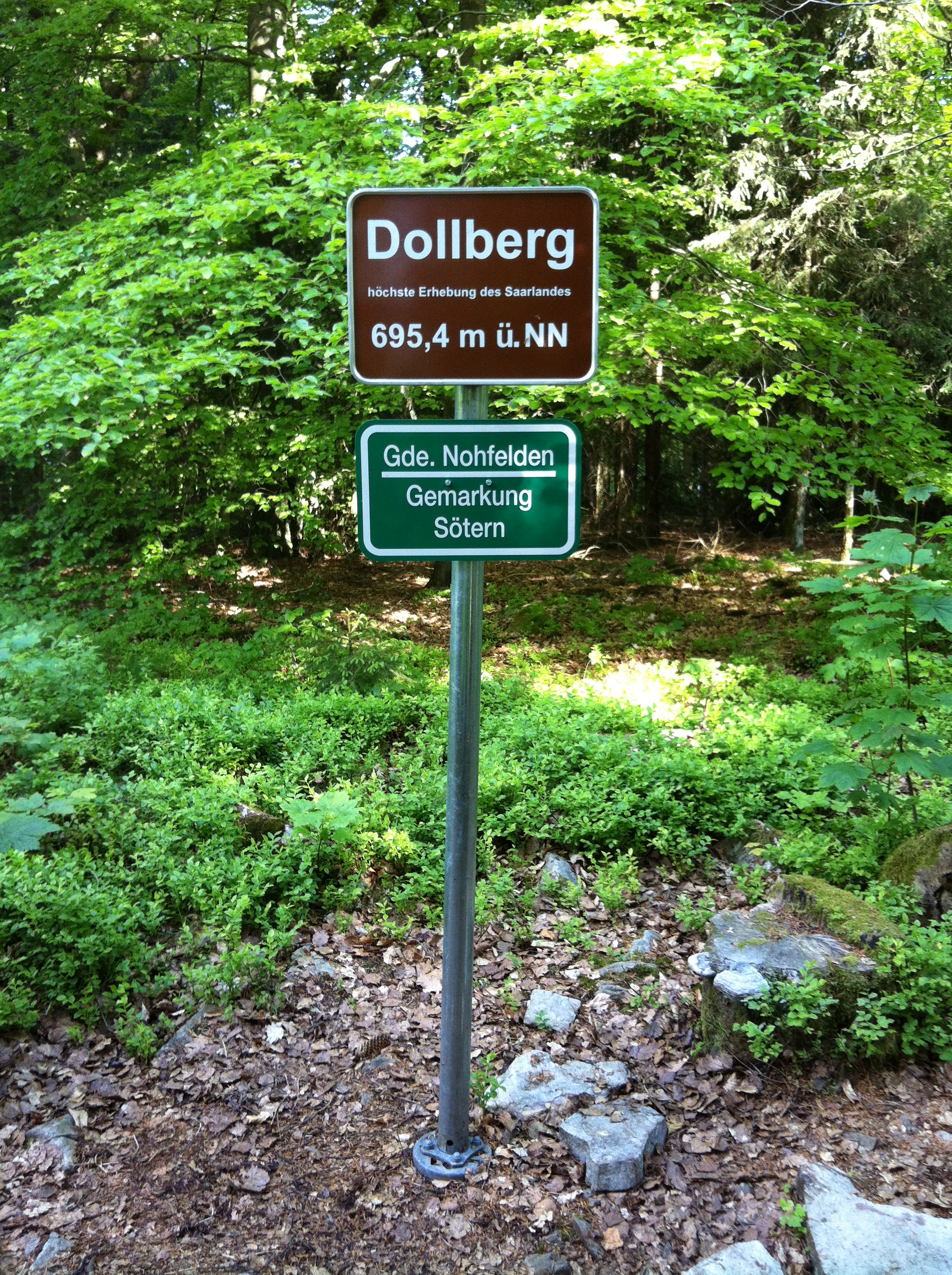
- Dollberg

Highest point
- Elevation: 695.4 m above sea level (NHN) (2,281 ft)
- Listing: highest point in the Saarland
- Coordinates: 49°37′47″N 7°00′52″E

Geography
- Location within Rhineland-Palatinate Location within Saarland
- Location: Counties of Trier-Saarburg and St. Wendel; Saarland, Rhineland-Palatinate, Germany
- Parent range: Dollberge

The Dollberg is a mountain in the Dollberge range in central Germany and the highest point in the state of Saarland. It is 695.4 m above sea level (NHN) and lies within the Schwarzwälder Hochwald on the boundary between the counties of Trier-Saarburg (Rhineland-Palatinate) and St. Wendel (Saarland).

== Geography ==
=== Location ===
The Dollberg lies within the Saar-Hunsrück Nature Park, on the northern state boundary of the Saarland with the neighbouring state of Rhineland-Palatinate, in the southwest of the Dollberge range. Its summit rises 1.4 km south of Neuhütten (Rhineland-Palatinate), on whose territory the mountain is located, 3.5 km north-northeast of Otzenhausen, 3.8 km northwest of Eisen and 4.5 km northeast of Nonnweiler (Saarland) in the municipality of Sötern which, as part of Nohfelden lies 5.3 km southwest of the Dollberg (all distances as the crow flies). West of the wooded mountain on the River Prims is the Prims Reservoir (Nonnweiler Dam).

== Highest mountain in the Saarland ==
In the 20th century the Dollberg and the Schimmelkopf (Weiskircher Höhe) were seen as the highest points in the Saarland, both being measured at 695 m. According to more precise surveys by the State Office for Land Registration, Survey and Mapping ( Landesamt für Kataster-, Vermessungs- und Kartenwesen) in 2005, the Dollberg at 695.4 m is around 0.6 m higher than the Schimmelkopf. The summit of the Dollberg is covered by mixed woodland that blocks all views of the surrounding area. Only a sign that describes it as the "highest point of the Saarland" marks the top. However, official maps neither record the name of the Dollberg nor its surveyed height of 695.4 m.

Dollberg and Schimmelkopf on official maps as at 2011
Scale	Dollberg	Schimmelkopf
1:200,000	no name – no height	695 m
1:100,000	"Dollberge" ridge, unnamed spot height	695 m
1:50,000	"Dollberge" ridge, unnamed spot height	695 m
1:25,000	"Dollberge" ridge, unnamed spot height	695 m
1:10,000	"Dollberge" ridge, no spot height	694.8 m
1:5,000	"Dollberge" ridge, no spot height	694.8 m

== Hillfort of Otzenhausen ==
In the area of the southwestern spur of the Dollberg, between the mountain and Nonnweiler, is the roughly 2.5 km long circular rampart of the hillfort of Otzenhausen, which was a Celtic refuge castle (oppidum).
