= Dollberge =

Mountain range in Germany

Coordinates: 49°39′N 7°02′E

The Dollberge are a small mountain range in the northern Saarland and the adjoining part of the state of Rhineland-Palatinate in Germany. They form a southeastern element of the Schwarzwälder Hochwald, a region in the Hunsrück mountains, and are up to 707.4 m above sea level (NN).

== Geography ==
=== Location ===
The Dollberge are an elongated chain of low mountains running from southeast to northwest through the Saar-Hunsrück Nature Park roughly from Nonnweiler (Saarland) to Börfink (Rhineland-Palatinate). The southwestern tip of the Dollberge lies in the northern Saarland near Nonnweiler; the larger northeastern line of the mountain ridge is located within Rhineland-Palatinate.

=== Mountains ===
The mountains of the Dollberge include the following – sorted by height in metres (m) above sea level (NN):

- Friedrichskopf (707.4 m), south of Börfink in the parish of Brücken, Rhineland-Palatinate
- Dollberg (695.4 m), southeast of Neuhütten, the highest mountain in the Saarland
- Vorkastell (626.0 m) (mountain spur and castle ruins), southeast of Börfink, Rhineland-Palatinate

=== Rivers and streams ===
Between the Dollberge and the Schwarzwalder Hochwald is the Prims Reservoir through which the River Prims flows. A tributary of the Prims, the Allbach (Altbach), rises on the Friedrichskopf. The Traunbach flows past the Dollberge to the northeast.

== Hillfort of Otzenhausen ==
In the areas of the southwestern foothills of the Dollberge between Nonnweiler and the Dollberg is the hillfort of Otzenhausen, a Celtic refuge fort (oppidum).
