= Schimmelkopf =

- (Weiskircher Höhe)
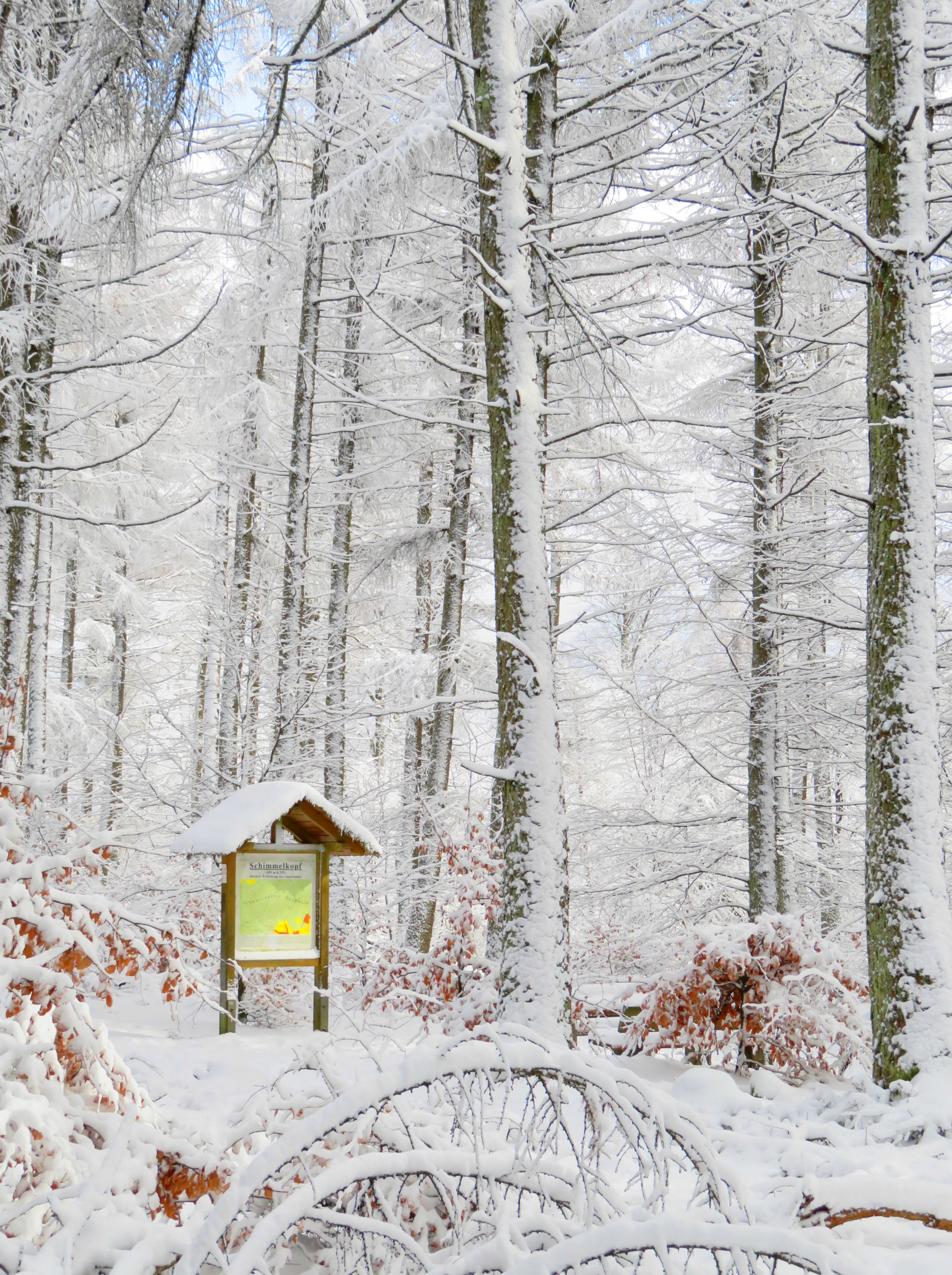

Highest point
- Elevation: 694.8 m above sea level (NHN) (2,280 ft)
- Listing: second highest elevation in Saarland
- Coordinates: 49°35′21″N 6°48′21″E

Geography
- Location within Saarland
- Location: near Weiskirchen; Saarland, Rhineland-Palatinate, Germany
- Parent range: Schwarzwälder Hochwald

The Schimmelkopf or Weiskircher Höhe is a mountain that rises in the Schwarzwälder Hochwald (part of the Hunsrück) on the boundary between the counties of Trier-Saarburg (Rhineland-Palatinate) and Merzig-Wadern (Saarland) and, at 694.8 m above sea level (NHN), is the second highest peak in the German state of Saarland.

== Geography ==
=== Location ===
The Schimmelkopf rises in the southwestern part of the Schwarzwälder Hochwald along the northern state border of the Saarland. Its summit lies within the Saar-Hunsrück Nature Park, about 4.8 km north of Weiskirchen (Saarland), around 3.7 km southeast of Mandern and circa 3.3 km south of Waldweiler (both in Rhineland-Palatinate).

=== Watercourses ===
North of the Schimmelkopfs rises the Ruwer tributary of Burkelsbach and, to its west, the Siebenbornbach, whose waters flow through the Winkelbach into the Burkelsbach. To the west-southwest lies the source of the Holzbach and on the southern flank is that of its tributary, the Schlittentaler Bach. On the southern mountainside in the area where it transitions to the Teufelskopf rises, in the east, the Kübelbach, which feeds the Wahnbach that runs to the southeast of the Schimmelkopf.

== Second highest mountain in the Saarland ==
In the 20th century the Dollberg and the Schimmelkopf (at the Weiskircher Höhe) were named as the highest points in the Saarland with their heights given in whole metres as 695 m. According to more precise measurements by the State Office for Cadastre, Survey and Mapping (Landesamt für Kataster-, Vermessungs- und Kartenwesen) in 2005, the Schimmelkopf measures 694.8 m and is thus around 0.6 m lower than the Dollberg which makes it only the second highest peak in the Saarland. Nevertheless, on official maps neither the name nor its official height of 695.4 m will be found next to the summit of the Dollberg.

The Dollberg and the Schimmelkopf in mapping by the Federal Nature Conservation Office
| | Dollberg | | | Schimmelkopf | | |
| Map scale | Name | Survey point | Height | Name | Survey point | Height |
| 1:200,000 | none | none | none | unnamed | at | 695 m |
| 1:100,000 | Dollberge (ridge) | at | 695 m | unnamed | at | 695 m |
| 1:50,000 | Dollberge (ridge) | at | 695 m | unnamed | at | 695 m |
| 1:25,000 | Dollberge (ridge) | at | 695 m | Schimmelkopf | at | 695 m |
| 1:10,000 | Dollberge (ridge) | none | none | Schimmelkopf | at | 694.8 m |
| 1:5,000 | Dollberge (ridge) | none | none | Schimmelkopf | at | 694.8 m |
