= Weiselberg =

Hill in Germany

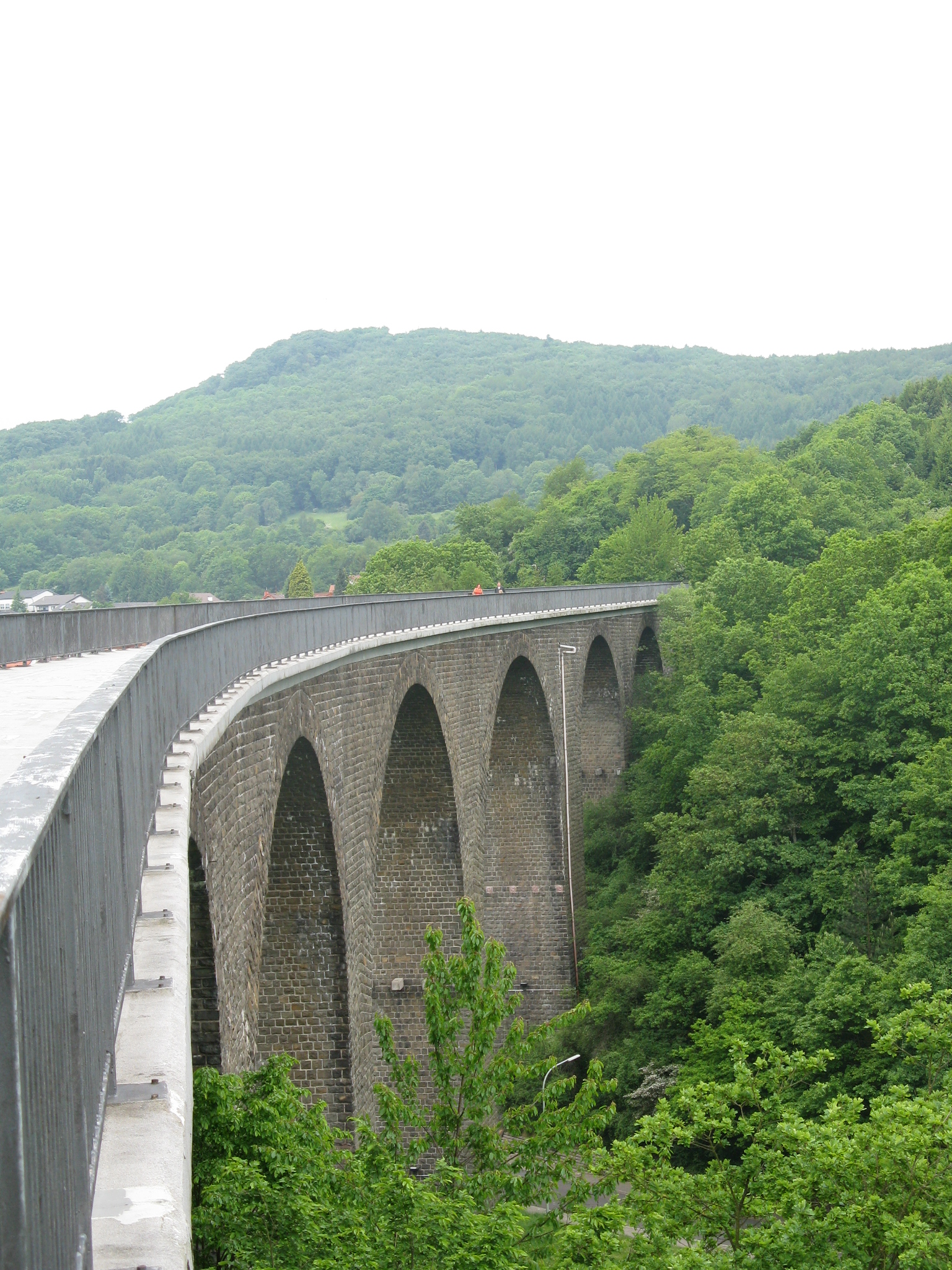
- The Weiselberg, seen from the Oberkirchen Viaduct

Highest point
- Elevation: 569.5 m above sea level (NHN) (1,868 ft)
- Coordinates: 49°31′21″N 7°14′36.9″E

Geography
- Location within Saarland
- Location: near Oberkirchen; St. Wendel, Saarland (Germany)
- Parent range: North Palatine Uplands

Geology
- Rock age: 280 MYA
- Mountain type: Volcanic pipe
- Rock type: dacite

The Weiselberg is a hill 569.5 m above sea level (NHN) in the North Palatine Uplands near Oberkirchen in the Saarland county of St. Wendel.

The Weiselberg is covered in forest, especially on its upper slopes and is a habitat for rare species of plant. It was made a nature reserve in 1950.

== Geography ==
=== Location ===
The Weiselberg is located in the southeastern part of the Saar-Hunsrück Nature Park immediately west of the village of Oberkirchen through which flows the Blies tributary of the Oster which rises on the north-northwest of the hill. Oberkirchen itself is in the municipality of Freisen. To the west-northwest rises the Leichweilerbach, a left-hand headstream of the Betzelbach. To the south is the Weiseler Born, the source of the Oster tributary, the Wilmesbach. The northern hill spur of the Weiselberg is the roughly 520 m-high Mittelberg, whose terrain transitions into the hill of Hochrech.

=== Natural regions ===
The Weiselberg lies in the natural regional major unit group of the Saar-Nahe Uplands (No. 19) on the boundary of the major units of the North Palatine Uplands (Glan-Alsenz Uplands and Hill Country, Glan-Alsenz-Berg- und Hügelland; 193) with its sub-unit, the Kusel Upland (Kuseler Bergland, 193.3) in the east and the Prims-Nahe Upland (Prims-Nahe-Bergland) (Upper Nahe Hills Oberes Nahebergland; 194) with its sub-unit, the Hirstein Upland (Hirsteiner Bergland, 194.2) in the west.

== Geology ==
Geologically, the Weiselberg belongs to the North Palatine Uplands. Its summit dome consists of volcanic rock (vulcanite) of the Permian (Rotliegendes), about 280 million years old.

A vulcanite is formed, when magma rises through the Earth's crust and breaks out onto the surface of the Earth. As it is weathered the soft rock surrounding it is eroded and the hard volcanic rock is left behind.

The hill is made of rock typical of its kind and which is named after it: weiselbergite (type locality), which was first described in 1887 by Karl Heinrich Rosenbusch. It is a deep black and light blue magmatic rock with isolated pieces of feldspar which give the appearance of the sky at night. According to Tröger it is a dacitic vulcanite with about 66% glass content. Agates are found within the rock. As early as Roman times agate was being excavated on the surface of the hill. From the 15th century, during an agate boom period, the green rock was mined using adits.

The Weiselberg is a magmatic volcanic plug. Its most striking rock formation is the Steinerne Schrank ("Stone Cupboard"), a wide rock face which looks like a large cupboard.

On the southern slopes of the Weiselberg lies a basaltic blockfield, the Steinernes Meer ("Rocky Sea"). Originally, magma rose from the Earth's interior. It gradually solidified under the Earth's surface to form mostly pentagonal column formations, which is typical of slowly cooling basalt. Their shape was caused during cooling by shrinkage of the magma, similar to cracks in the drying mud of a puddle. Over a period of millions of years, the surrounding softer rock was eroded. The blockfield visible today was formed during the ice age around 10,000 years ago by solifluction of the weathered rock columns.

1982 mapping showed that the rock columns in the area of the summit dome have a so-called Meilerstellung ("milling position"). This is usually caused by the fact that a lava lake in the crater of a volcano solidifies relatively quickly. The high glass content in the rock also indicates that the original magma was very near to the surface and cooled fast. The columns then formed perpendicular to the crater walls.

== Protected areas ==
The majority of the Weiselberg is protected by the Weisselberg Nature Reserve (CDDA No. 82884; established in 1950; 74.2 ha in area), the Weisselberg Special Area of Conservation (FFH No. 6409-305; 78 ha) and the Weisselberg bird reserve (VSG No. 6409-305; 78 ha). On the hill are parts of the protected area of the County of St. Wendel and Municipality of Freisen (CDDA No. 390232; 1976; 11.4797 km^{2}).

== Sources ==
- W. E. Tröger: Spezielle Petrographie der Eruptivgesteine, Verlag Schweizerbart, Stuttgart, 1935
- Der große ADAC Natur-Reiseführer, ADAC Verlag, Munich, 1991, ISBN 3-87003-390-8
