= Johannes Kühn (writer) =

German writer and poet (1934–2023)

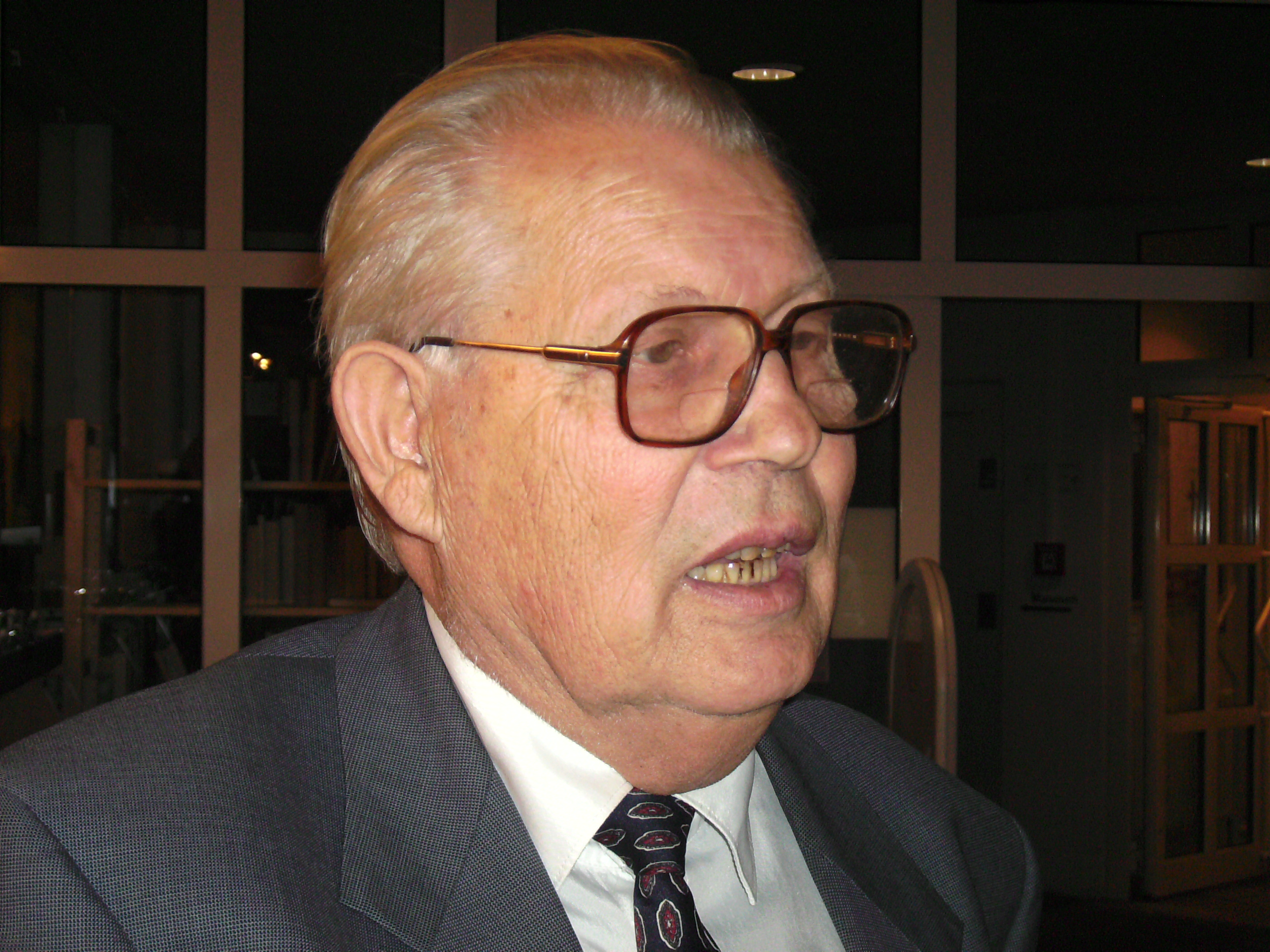
- Kühn in 2008
- Born: 3 February 1934; Bergweiler, Tholey, Territory of the Saar Basin
- Died: 3 October 2023 (aged 89); Hasborn-Dautweiler, Saarland, Germany
- Education: Saarland University; University of Freiburg
- Occupations: Writer; Poet

Johannes Kühn (3 February 1934 – 3 October 2023) was a German writer and poet.

== Biography ==
Born in Tholey on 3 February 1934, Kühn grew up in a family of miners. In 1948, he enrolled at the Missionshaus St. Wendel, but dropped out in 1953 without a diploma. He studied at Saarland University and the University of Freiburg as a guest student from 1956 to 1961. From 1963 to 1973, he worked for his brother's engineering company. During this time, he also wrote dramas, poems, and fairy tales, which failed to gain much attention at first.

Following his time as an engineer, Kühn traveled through Saarland and wrote poems on nature. However, at the start of the 1980s, he gradually stopped publishing poems. However, his works were published by Ludwig Harig and he received very positive responses. His life was represented in the 2018 film Papier, Stift, Kaffee und Zigarren – Der Dichter Johannes Kühn, directed by Gabi Heleen Bollinger.

Johannes Kühn died on 3 October 2023, at the age of 89.

== Works ==
=== Poems ===
- Vieles will Klang, immer wieder (1957)
- Saarländische Anthologie (1958)
- Stimmen der Stille (1970)
- Salzgeschmack (1984)
- Ich Winkelgast (1989)
- Am Fenster der Verheißungen (1992)
- Meine Wanderkreise (1990)
- Blas aus die Sterne (1991)
- Gelehnt an Luft (1992)
- Wenn die Hexe Flöte spielt (1994)
- Leuchtspur (1995)
- Lerchenaufstieg (1996)
- Wasser genügt nicht. Gasthausgedichte (1997)
- Hab ein Aug mit mir (1998)
- Em Guguck lauschdre (1999)
- Mit den Raben am Tisch (2000)
- Gedichte (2001)
- Nie verließ ich den Hügelring (2002)
- Ich muß nicht reisen (2004)
- Gärten ohne Grenzen (2004)
- Ganz ungetröstet bin ich nicht (2007)
- Zu Ende ist die Schicht. Bergmannsgedichte (2013)
- Und hab am Gras mein Leben gemessen (2014)
- Besitzlos, den Schmetterling feiernd (2018)
- Und schwebe ab in eine ganz andre Welt. Gedichte & Zeichnungen (2020)

=== Plays ===
- Die Totengruft (1966)
- Kampf um die Möbel (1968)

=== Prose ===
- Zugvögel haben mir berichtet. Märchen (1988)
- Ein Ende zur rechten Zeit. Erzählung (2004)

=== Audiobooks ===
- Künstlerbegegnungen (2005)
