= Barbara Esser =

Barbara Esser (born Barbara Kunz: 17 February 1902 - 2 June 1952) was a German political activist (KPD) who sat as a Communist member of the Reichstag (national parliament) during the years of parliamentary deadlock that preceded the Nazi take-over.

== Biography ==
Barbara Kunz was born in Marpingen, a small town in the hilly countryside north of Saarbrücken. She trained and worked in Essen as a bookbinder. During the 1920s she married Joseph Esser. He was a coal miner and a communist who came from the same part of the Saarland as she did. He was nine years older than she was. Sources indicate that they separated early on, but Barbara Kunz did nevertheless become Barbara Esser.

During the early 1920s she joined the recently formed Communist Party. She was particularly active in the party's women's movement. In 1928/29 she travelled to Moscow to attend a party training course on political agitation. She had been selected for the course by the local party leadership (Bezirksleitung) in her home district, the Ruhr region. She became a local leader (Gaufuhrerin) in the "Roter Frauen und Mädchen Bund" (RFMB), a paramilitary anti-Nazi organisation with close links to the Communist Party and to Moscow.

In September 1930 she stood successfully for election to the Reichstag (national parliament) in Berlin as a Communist Party candidate, representing her home constituency, Electoral District 17 (Westfalen Nord) and retaining her seat till the next election. As parliament became ever more deadlocked, in 1931 it was recorded that she was also a member of the regional executive of the Revolutionary Trades Union Opposition movement for the Ruhr region.

In January 1933 the National Socialists took power and lost no time in transforming Germany into a post-democratic one-party dictatorship. The Reichstag dissolved itself a few months later and those who had been Communist politicians before the party was banned were pursued with particular energy by the authorities. During 1933/34 Esser found herself charged with "preparing to commit high treason" which would normally have involved a period of investigatory detention, but sources are silent on this point and on other details of the case. In any case, on 4 June 1934 the special People's Court set her free, citing "insufficient evidence" to continue with the case.

Esser was by this time retired from politics, and took a job. From 1938 she was living with a former trades union official called Hermann Braun. Barbara Esser died in the Berlin district of Wittenau on 2 June 1952.
