= Saar-Hunsrück Nature Park =

Coordinates: 49.56°N 6.76°E

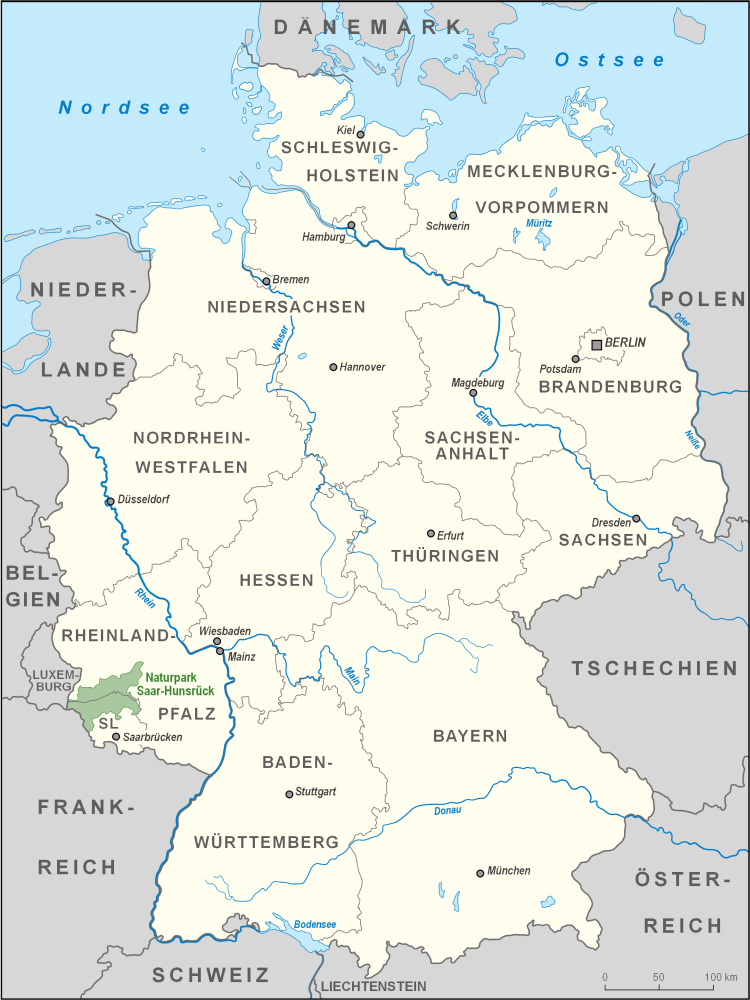
Location of the Saar-Hunsrück Nature Park

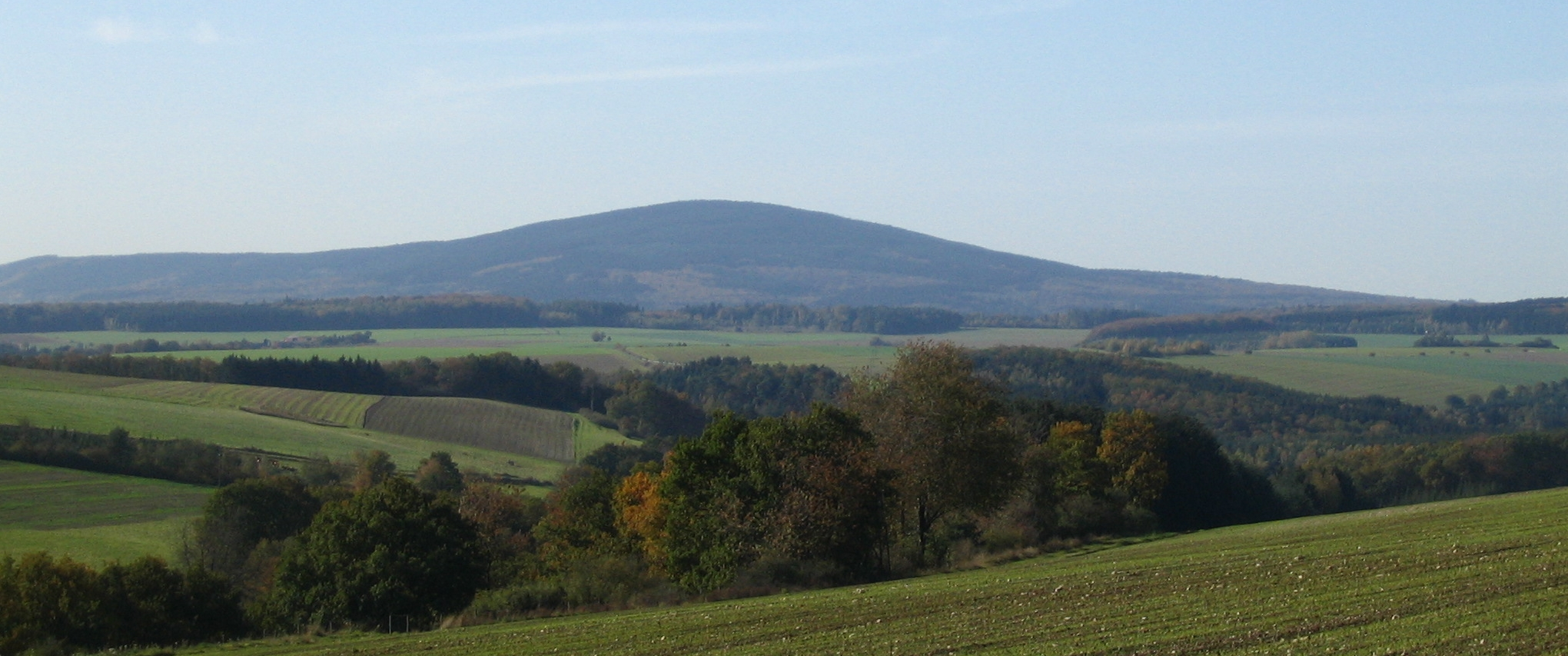
The Idarkopf in the Saar-Hunsrück Nature Park

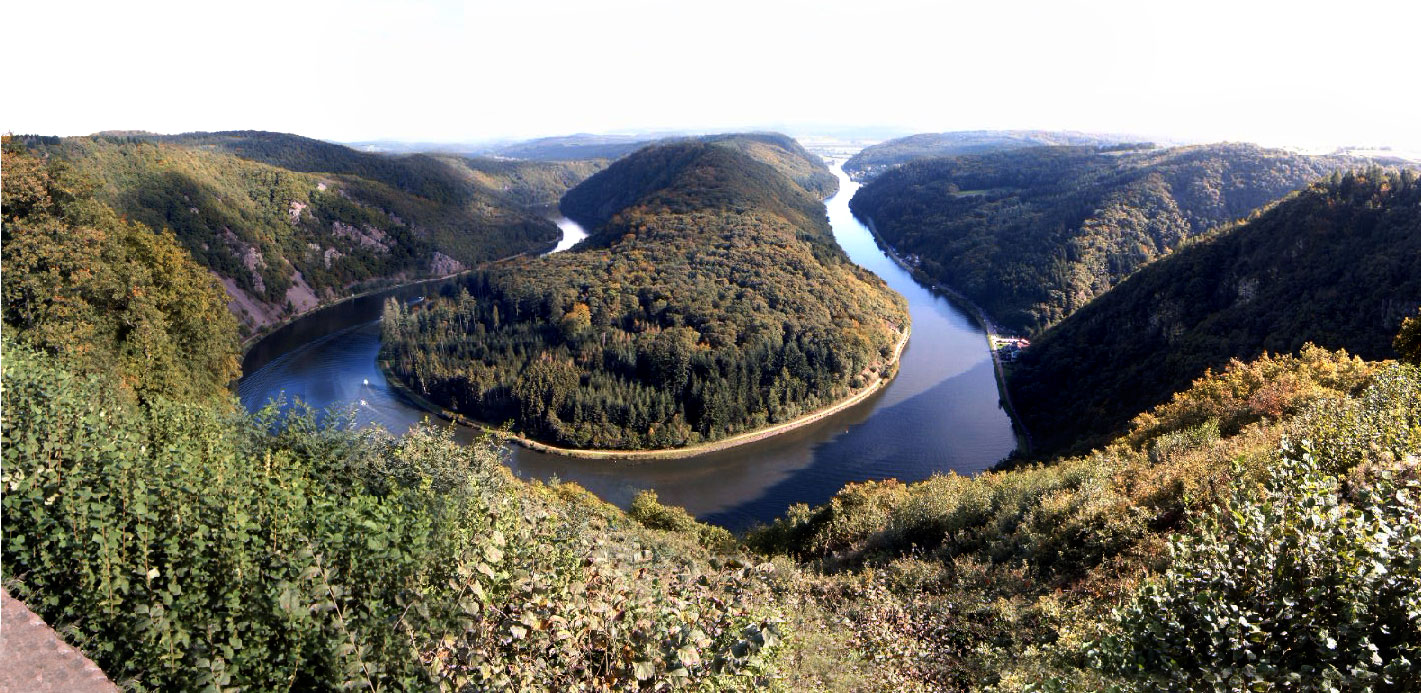
View from the Cloef over the bend in the River Saar

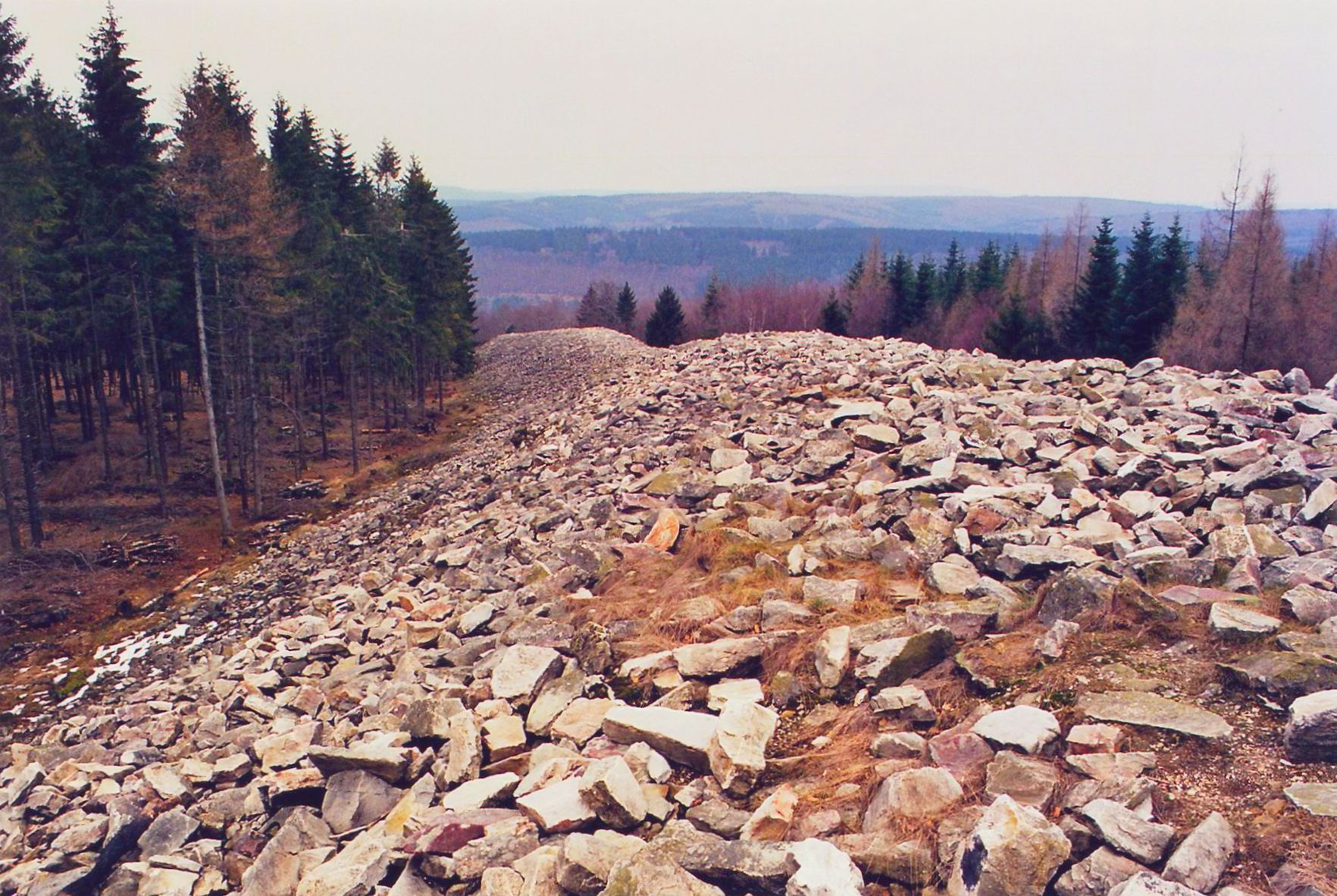
The circular rampart of Otzenhausen

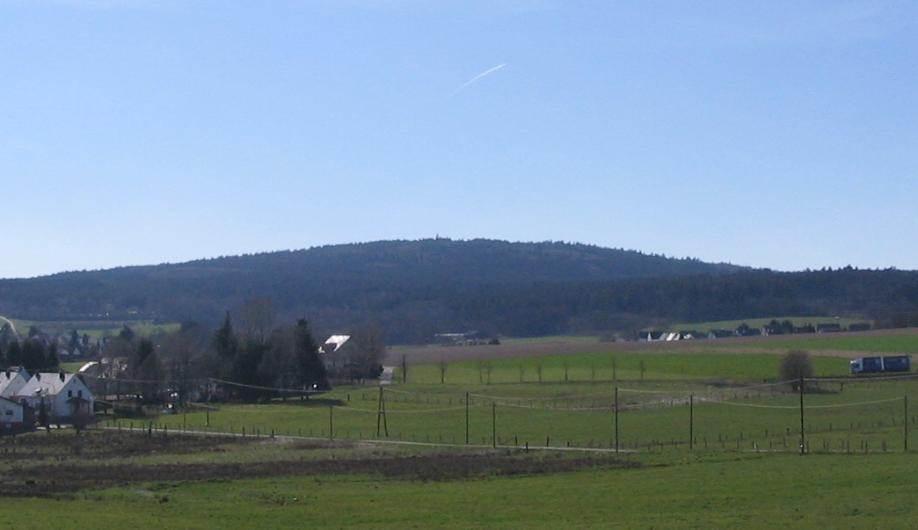
Rösterkopf near Reinsfeld

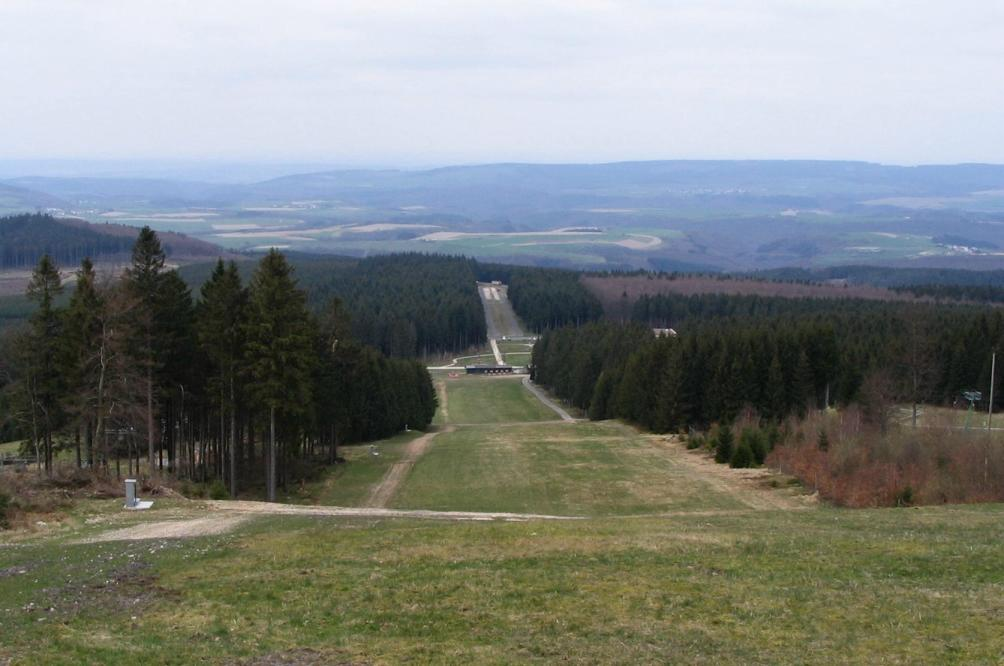
View from the Erbeskopf

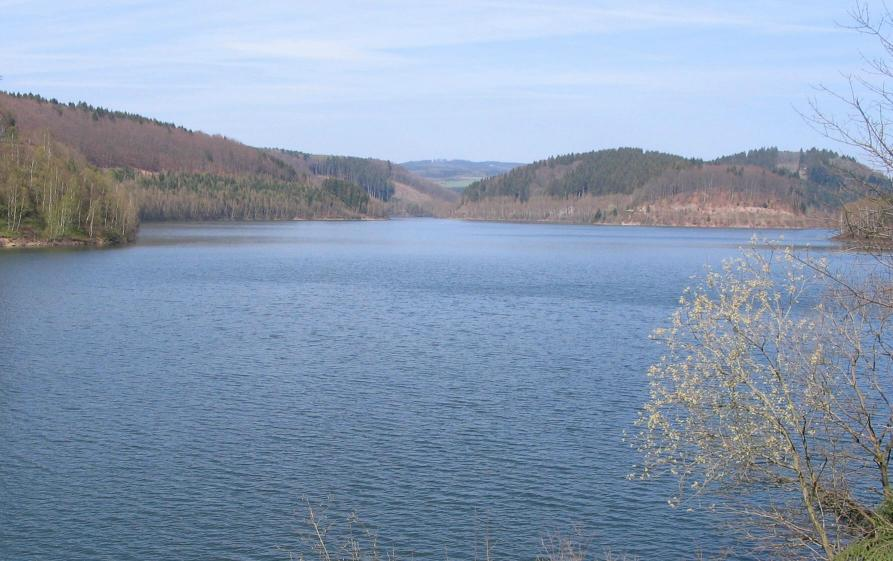
Prims Reservoir

The Saar-Hunsrück Nature Park (German: Naturpark Saar-Hunsrück) was established in 1980 and covers an area of just under 2,000 km² in the German states of Rhineland-Palatinate and the Saarland.

The authority responsible for the nature park is the Saar-Hunsrück Nature Park Society (Verein Naturpark Saar-Hunsrück) with its headquarters in Hermeskeil. In Hermeskeil the society runs an "experience museum" and one of six information centres.

== Towns and villages ==
In the Saarland, the nature park lies wholly within the town boroughs and local municipalities of Perl, Mettlach, Losheim am See, Merzig, Weiskirchen, Wadern, Beckingen, Rehlingen-Siersburg, Wallerfangen, Nonnweiler, Tholey, Nohfelden, Oberthal, Namborn, St. Wendel and Freisen. It also lies partly on the territories of Lebach, in its municipalities of Dörsdorf and Steinbach, the municipality of Schmelz, in its parishes of Dorf, Limbach and Michelbach and within the municipality of Eppelborn, in the parish of Dirmingen.

In Rhineland-Palatinate the nature park lies on parts of the territories of the following boroughs and collective municipalities: Saarburg, Konz, Ruwer, Kell am See, Hermeskeil (Trier-Saarburg), Thalfang, Bernkastel-Kues (Bernkastel-Wittlich), Kirchberg/Hunsrück (Rhein-Hunsrück-Kreis), Herrstein-Rhaunen, Birkenfeld and Baumholder (Birkenfeld) and parts of the free municipality of Morbach (Landkreis Bernkastel-Wittlich) and the large county town of Idar-Oberstein (Birkenfeld).

== Core zones ==
There are seven core zones in the Rhineland –Palatinate part of the park, which are specially protected:

- Mannebach Valley
- Saar Valley-Leukbach Valley
- Osburger Hochwald
- Western part of the Schwarzwälder Hochwald
- Eastern part of the Schwarzwälder Hochwald-Idar Forest
- Neuhof-Abentheuer
- Southeastern Hochwald Kirschweiler/Buhlenberg

== Rivers and streams ==
- Moselle
- Saar
- Ruwer
- Prims
- Nied
- Nahe
- Dhron
- Idarbach
- Bostalsee
- Losheimer Stausee
- Primstalsperre
- Schwollbach
- Traunbach

== Mountains and hills ==
The mountains and hills in the Saar-Hunsrück Nature Park include the following – sorted by height in metres (m) above sea level (Normalnull or NN; unless otherwise stated these are referenced from state map service):

- Erbeskopf (816.32 m), Schwarzwälder Hochwald
- An den zwei Steinen (766.2 m), Idar Forest
- Kahlheid (766.0 m), Idar Forest
- Sandkopf (756.8 m), Schwarzwälder Hochwald
- Steingerüttelkopf (756.6 m), Idarwald
- Ruppelstein (755.2 m), Schwarzwälder Hochwald
- Idarkopf (745.7 m), Idar Forest
- Usarkopf (725.0 m), Idar Forest
- Rösterkopf (708.1 m), Osburger Hochwald
- Friedrichskopf (707.4 m), Schwarzwälder Hochwald

== Saar-Hunsrück-Steig ==
One of the nature park's projects is the 218-kilometre-long "premier" long-distance path, the Saar-Hunsrück-Steig from Perl on the border with Luxembourg via Mettlach, Weiskirchen and the Roman city of Trier to the Prims Reservoir, continuing via the Erbeskopf, the circular rampart of Otzenhausen, to the Wildenburger Kopf and finally to Idar-Oberstein.

== See also ==
- List of nature parks in Germany

== Literature ==
- Hans-Martin Braun and Carsten Braun: Saar-Hunsrück Nature Park - Stille Schönheit. Tecklenborg Verlag, Steinfurt, 2002, ISBN 3-934427-25-1
