= Schwarzwälder Hochwald =

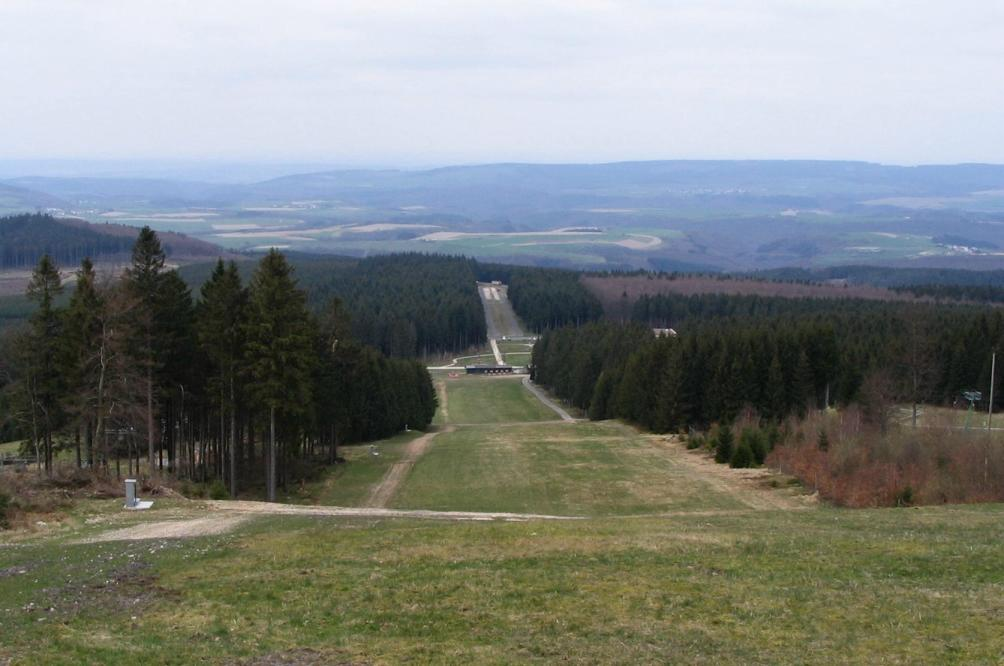
View from the Erbeskopf

The Schwarzwälder Hochwald (German pronunciation: [ˈʃvaʁtsvɛldɐ ˈho:xvalt]; literally 'Black Forest High Forest'), not to be confused with the High Black Forest, is the high south-western part of the Hunsrück in the German states of Saarland and Rhineland-Palatinate. The mountains are up to 816.32 m high.

== Geography ==
=== Location ===
The Schwarzwälder Hochwald lies within the Saar-Hunsrück Nature Park, running roughly from Mettlach in the Saarland to the Erbeskopf in Rhineland-Palatinate. It lies northwest of Losheim, Weiskirchen, Wadern and Nonnweiler in the Saarland and between Hermeskeil and Birkenfeld and between Thalfang and Idar-Oberstein in Rhineland-Palatinate.

North of the Schwarzwälder Hochwald lies the Osburger Hochwald; both forested mountain ranges are known simply as the Hochwald ("High Forest"). The southeastern part of the Schwarzwälder Hochwald is called the Dollberge.

To the northeast of the Schwarzwälder Hochwald is the Idar Forest.

=== Mountains ===
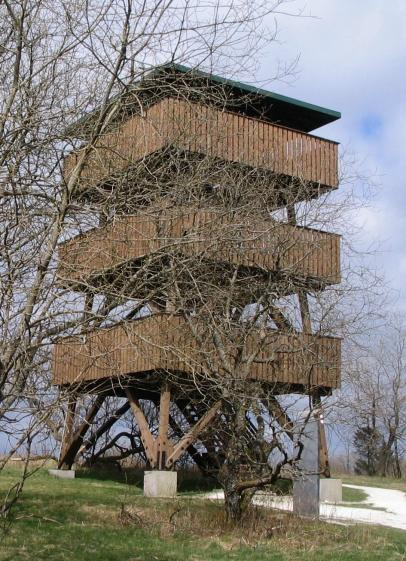
The Erbeskopf Tower

The mountains and hills of the Schwarzwälder Hochwald include the following – sorted by their elevation in metres (m) above sea level (Normalnull unless otherwise stated):

- Erbeskopf (816.32 m), near Thalfang, highest mountain in the Hunsrück and in Rhineland-Palatinate
- Ruppelstein (762.7 m), near Börfink, county of Birkenfeld, Rhineland-Palatinate
- Sandkopf (757.4 m), near Neuhütten-Muhl, highest mountain in the county of Trier-Saarburg, Rhineland-Palatinate
- Friedrichskopf (707.4 m), near Brücken, Birkenfeld, Rhineland-Palatinate
- Dollberg (695.4 m), between Neuhütten (Rhineland-Palatinate) and Eisen (Saarland), highest mountain of the Saarland; on the border with Rhineland-Palatinate
- Teufelskopf (695.0 m), near Waldweiler, in the Irrwald, Rhineland-Palatinate
- Schimmelkopf (Weiskircher Höhe; 694.8 m), between Mandern (Rhineland-Palatinate) and Weiskirchen (Saarland), second highest mountain of the Saarland; on the border with Rhineland-Palatinate
- Mückenbornberg (692.6 m), near Waldweiler, in the Irrwald, Rhineland-Palatinate
