= Holzbach (Hochwald) =

Stream in Saarland, Germany

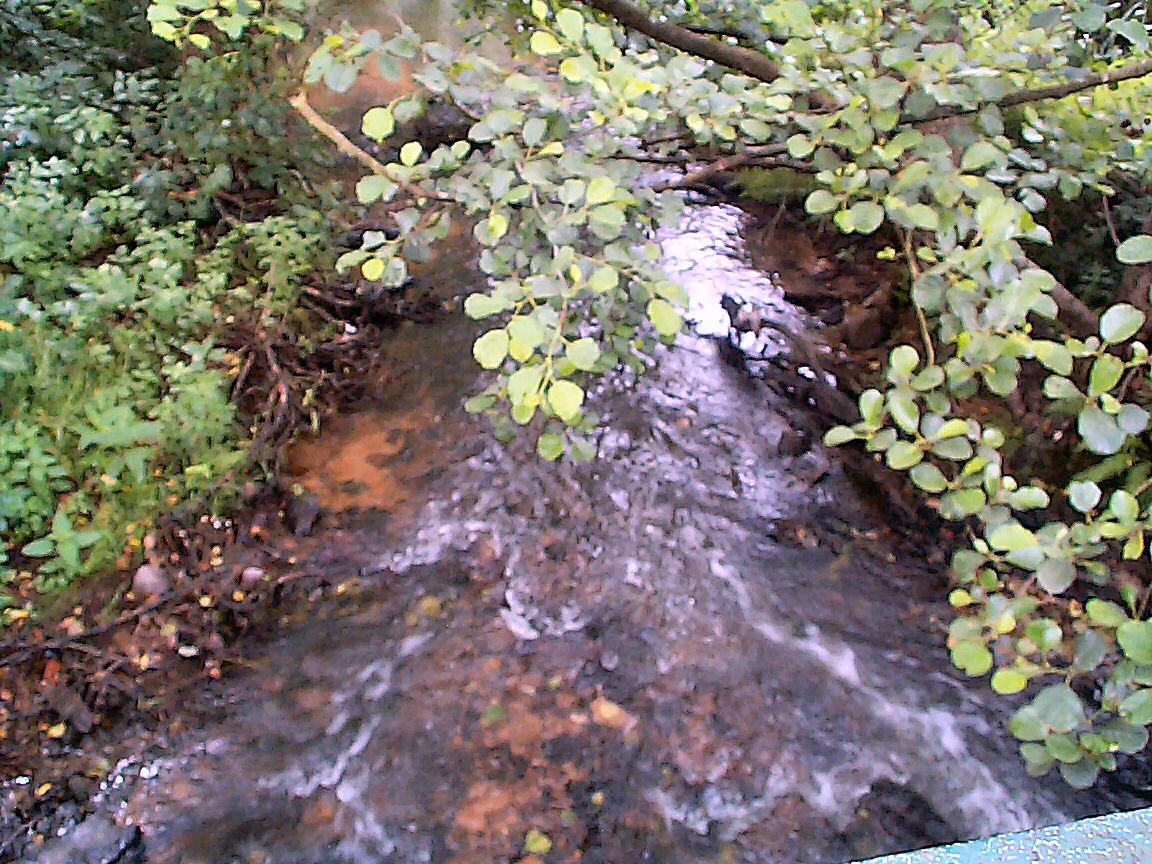
- The Holzbach at Thailen

- Map of the Holzbach

Location
- Location: Hunsrück: Hochwald; northern Saarland: country of Merzig-Wadern
- Reference no.: DE: 264664

Physical characteristics
- Source
  - location: north of Weiskirchen
  - coordinates: 49°34′42″N 6°46′27″E
  - elevation: 565 m above sea level (NN)
- Mouth
  - location: at Nunkirchen into the Losheimer Bach
  - coordinates: 49°29′29.5″N 6°49′10″E
  - elevation: 256 m above sea level (NN)
- Length: 13.23 km
- Basin size: 26.0 km²

Basin features
- Progression: Losheimer Bach → Prims → Saar → Moselle → Rhine → North Sea
- River system: Rhine
- Landmarks: Small towns: Wadern; Villages: Weiskirchen

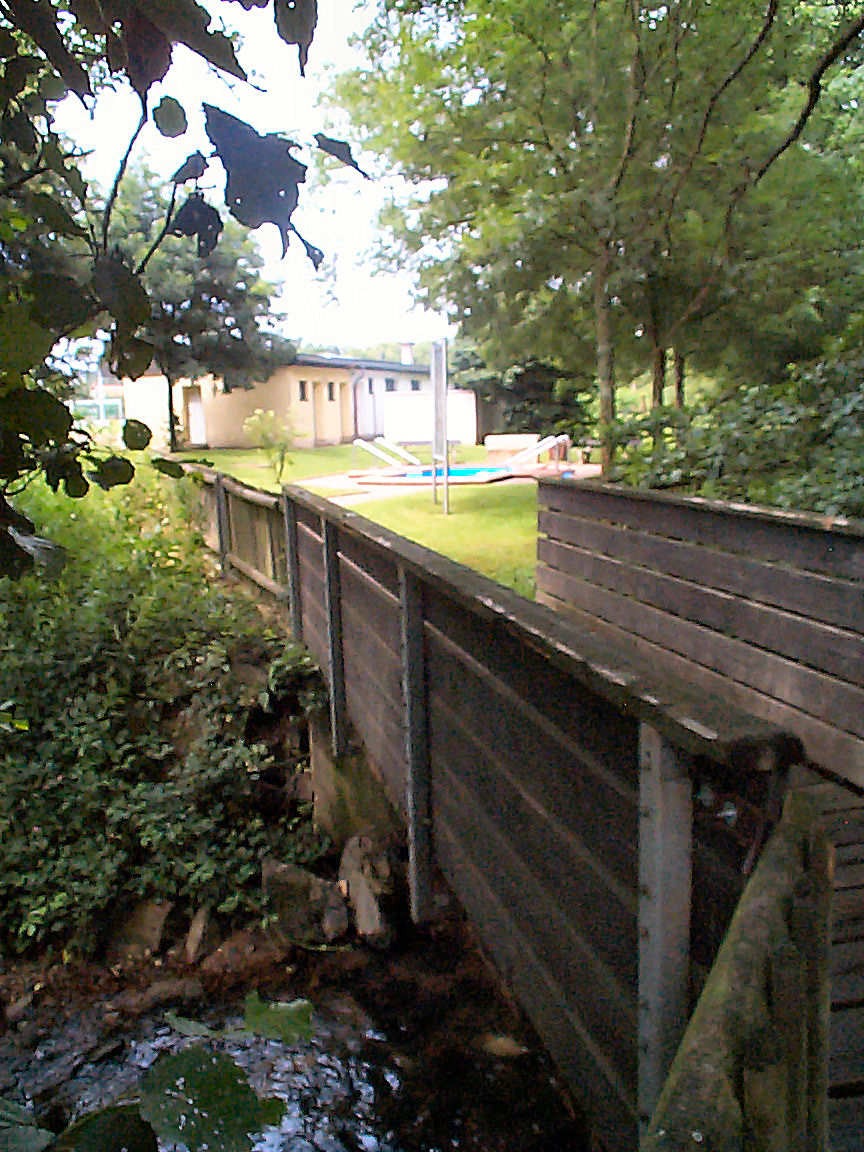
Bridge over the Holzbach in the Kneipp facility at Thailen

The Holzbach (German pronunciation: [ˈhɔlt͡sˌbax]) is a stream in the state of Saarland, Germany, in the uplands of the Schwarzwälder Hochwald. It flows into the Losheimer Bach at Nunkirchen, a district of Wadern.

== Geography ==
=== Course ===
The Holzbach rises in the Hunsrück mountains at a height of 565 m above NHN north of Weiskirchen and empties into the Losheimer Bach at Nunkirchen at a height of 256 m.

=== Tributaries ===
- Flachsbach (left)
- Schlittentaler Bach (left)
- Ruwerbach (right)

=== Settlements ===
The Holzbach flows through the following settlements:

- Weiskirchen
- Konfeld
- Thailen
- Batschweiler
- Weierweiler
- Münchweiler
- Nunkirchen

== See also ==
- List of rivers of Saarland
