= Namborn =

- Municipality
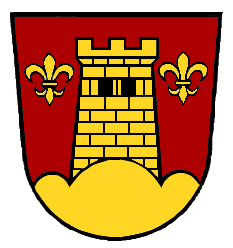
- Coat of arms

- Location of Namborn within Sankt Wendel district
- Interactive map of Namborn
- Location within Germany Location within Saarland
- Coordinates: 49°31′N 7°8′E
- Country: Germany
- State: Saarland
- District: Sankt Wendel
- Subdivisions: 8

Government
  - Mayor (2018–28): Sascha Hilpüsch (Ind.)

Area
  - Total: 25.98 km^{2} (10.03 sq mi)
- Elevation: 288–509 m (945–1,670 ft)

Population (2025-12-31)
  - Total: 7,028
  - Density: 270.5/km^{2} (700.6/sq mi)
- Time zone: UTC+01:00 (CET)
  - Summer (DST): UTC+02:00 (CEST)
- Postal codes: 66640
- Dialling codes: 06857 (Namborn: 06854, Baltersweiler: 06851)
- Vehicle registration: WND
- Website: www.namborn.de

Namborn (German pronunciation: [ˈnambɔʁn]) is a municipality in the district of Sankt Wendel, in Saarland, Germany. It is situated approximately 7 km north of Sankt Wendel, and 25 km southwest of Idar-Oberstein. It is approximately 40 km northeast of Saarbrücken on highway B 41 and the Nahe Valley Railway line. The distance to the Bostalsee is about 10 km, and to the district seat St. Wendel about 7 km.

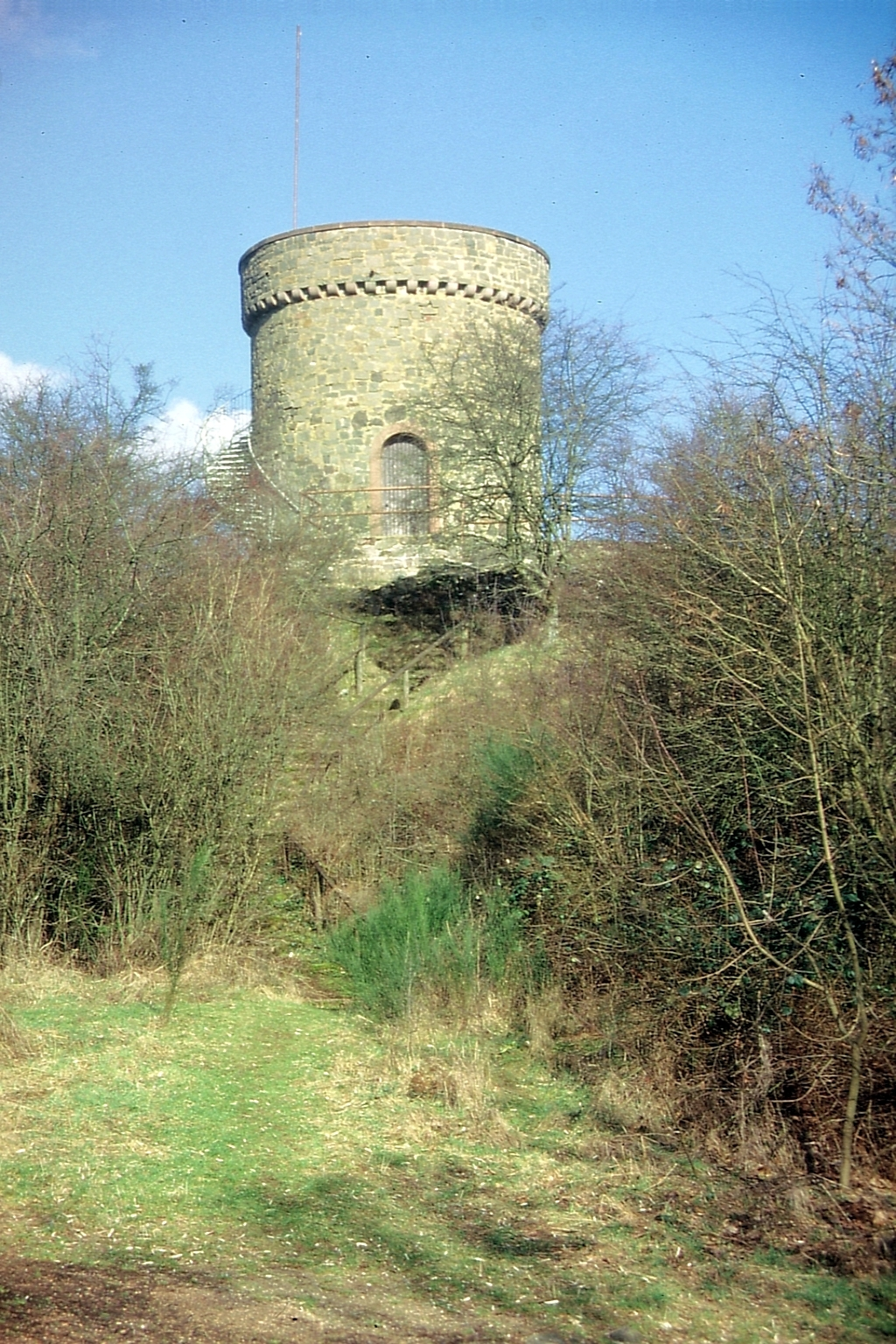
Liebenburg Castle observation tower

The most famous landmark of the community is the ruins of Liebenburg Castle on the Schloßberg in the Eisweiler district.

The administrative center is located in the Hofeld-Mauschbach district because of its convenient transport links and central location.

== Geography ==
=== Location ===
Namborn is located in a low wooded mountain range between the rivers Nahe and Blies in the Saar-Hunsrück Nature Park. The highest elevation is the Friedenberg in Hirstein at 509 m; the lowest point is 298 m in Urweiler, where the Todbach leaves Namborn for St. Wendel. Recognized natural monuments are the Wendalinushöhle (Wendelin's cave) in Baltersweiler, a historic Linden tree in Furschweiler, the Allerbach rock wall in Namborn, and 3 Oaks in Roschberg.

=== Political organization ===
Namborn is composed of the following ten districts: Baltersweiler, Eisweiler, Furschweiler, Gehweiler, Heisterberg, Hirstein, Hofeld-Mauschbach, Namborn, Pinsweiler, and Roschberg.

=== Natural conservancy ===
The Schlossberg, an approximately 10 hectare area in the Eisweiler district, has been protected since February 1937 because of the occurrence of several rare plant species, and since November 1957 as a nature reserve (Naturschutzgebiet ), making it the oldest nature reserve in Saarland. Since November 1983 there is a second reserve of 19.68 ha, Weiherbruch und Rohrbachwiesen , in the Namborn district and the neighboring community of Oberthal. Additionally, parts of the districts of Heisterberg, Hirstein, Hofeld-Mauschbach, Namborn and Pinsweiler belong to the landscape protection area of the St. Wendel district. The entire municipality of Namborn is located in the Saar-Hunsrück Nature Park. Ordinances demarcating the flood plain of the Todbach and the Rohrbacher Wiesen water conservation area protect additional areas.

== History ==
Numerous finds from the Celtic and Roman times, which were discovered or partially exposed in the communities of Baltersweiler, Eisweiler, Furschweiler, Bornerhof, Heisterberg, Hirstein, Namborn, and Roschberg, testify to an early settlement of the area. Liebenburg Castle, probably built around 1200 and first documented in 1220, is another indication of the importance of the area.

Over time the different parts of the district belonged to various regional authorities, and changed hands several times between French and German control. The district assumed its present composition following the administrative restructuring concluding in 1975.

== Sister city ==
Since 1987 there has been a partnership between Namborn and the French town of Langeac in the Haute-Loire department of Auvergne-Rhône-Alpes, some 800 km away.

== Culture and points of interest ==
- In all districts except Pinsweiler village community rooms are available.
- A popular destination for hikers are the ruins of the 12th-century Liebenburg in Eisweiler. Constructed in 1976/77 on the original foundation, this highly visible observation tower offers views over the village and the St. Wendel countryside, and houses a wedding reception hall.
- The first-class hiking trail "Schmuggler-Pfad" (rated at 53 points), created in 2009, has a length of 12.8 km at an altitude of 310 to 480 m above sea level. At a medium difficulty level plan on a walking time of 4 to 4.5 hours. Starting point: at the Schützenhaus in Hofeld-Mauschbach along Furschweilerstraße (with clockwise direction recommended). For hiking groups, there is also the possibility of a guided hike. Telephone registration in the Namborner Rathaus.
- The Street of Sculptures, which leads from St. Wendel to the Bostalsee, also touches the municipality of Baltersweiler.
- The Westwall (Siegfried Line) passed through the area, of which only the ruins of demolished bunkers can be seen in Hirstein and Gehweiler, and in Hofeld-Mauschbach and Baltersweiler a few remains in the form of dragon's teeth.

Also worth seeing are the parish churches of the Assumption in Namborn and St. Willibrord in Baltersweiler. A similar church to the Assumption is St. Mark's in Braunshorn, Rheinland-Pfalz.
