= Hasborn-Dautweiler =

- Ortsteil of Tholey
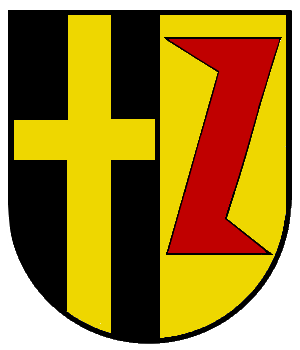
- Coat of arms
- Interactive map of Hasborn-Dautweiler
- Location within Germany Location within Saarland
- Coordinates: 49°28′N 7°2′E
- Country: Germany
- State: Saarland
- District: Sankt Wendel
- Municipality: Tholey

Area
  - Total: 9.04 km^{2} (3.49 sq mi)
- Elevation: 339 m (1,112 ft)

Population (2020)
  - Total: 2,589
  - Density: 286/km^{2} (742/sq mi)
- Time zone: UTC+01:00 (CET)
  - Summer (DST): UTC+02:00 (CEST)
- Postal codes: 66636
- Dialling codes: 06853
- Vehicle registration: WND

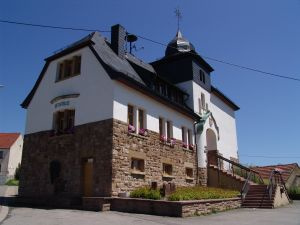
The old town hall of Hasborn-Dautweiler

Hasborn-Dautweiler is a part of the municipality Tholey in the district of Sankt Wendel in the northern Saarland, Germany. Until the end of 1973 Hasborn-Dautweiler was an independent municipality.

== History ==
In connection with the territory and administrative reform in the Saarland in 1974, on January 1, 1974, the thus far independent municipality Hasborn-Dautweiler was associated to the newly created municipality of Tholey

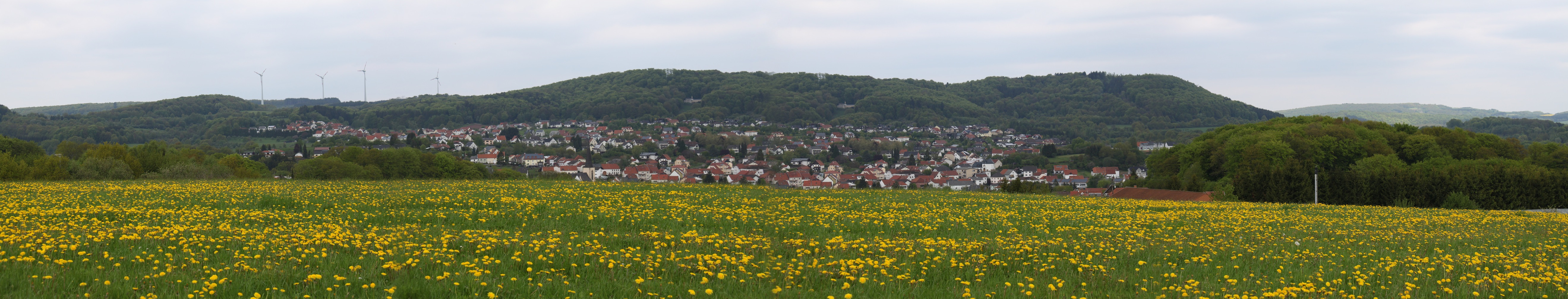
Panorama of Hasborn-Dautweiler
