= Marpingen =

- Municipality
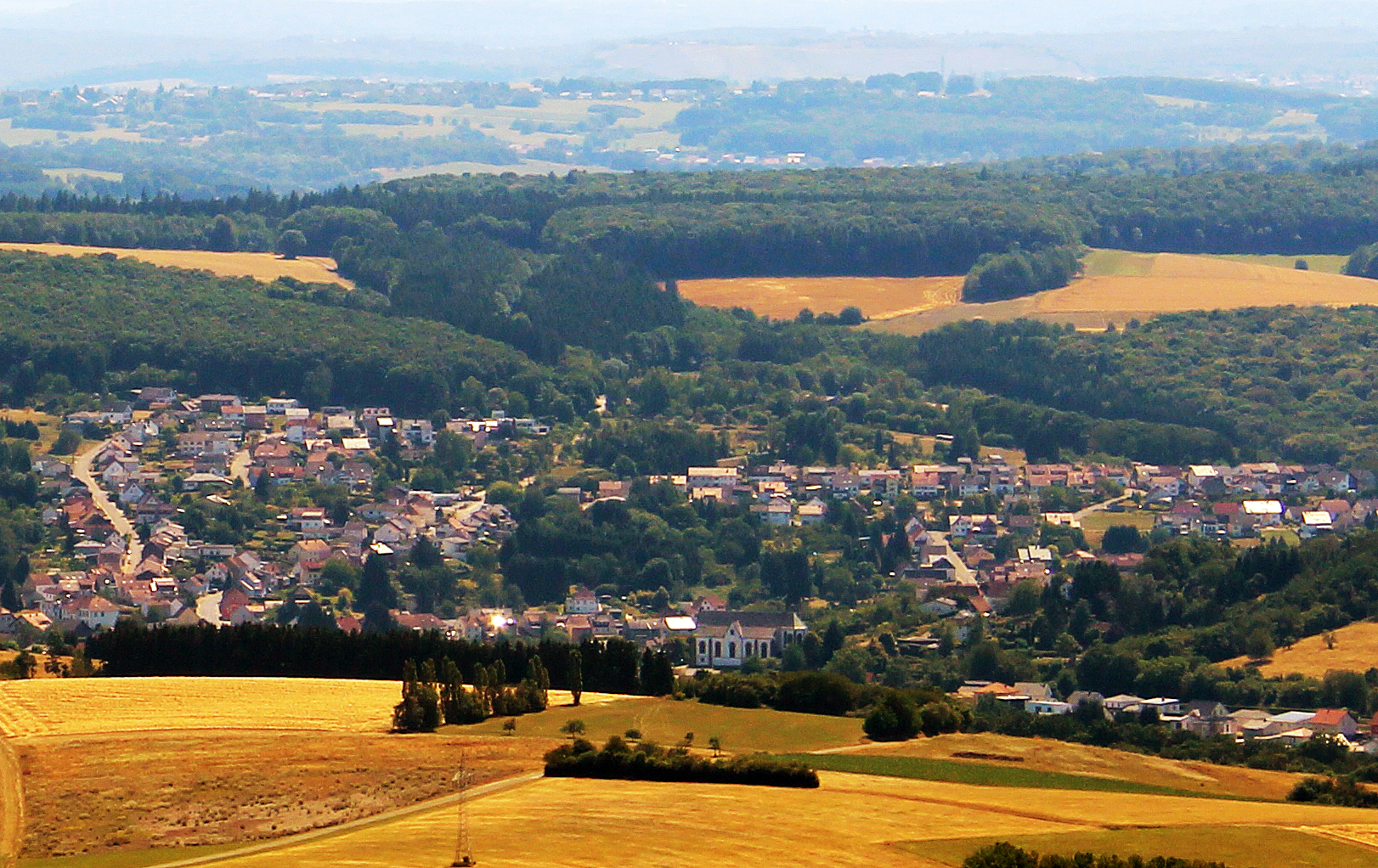

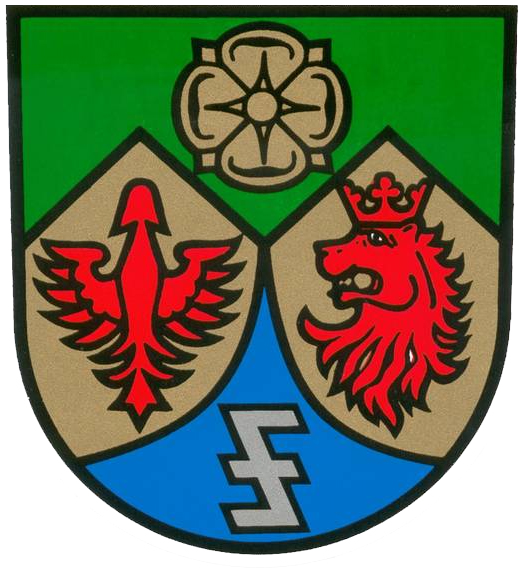
- Coat of arms

- Location of Marpingen within Sankt Wendel district
- Interactive map of Marpingen
- Location within Germany Location within Saarland
- Coordinates: 49°27′N 7°3′E
- Country: Germany
- State: Saarland
- District: Sankt Wendel
- Subdivisions: 4

Government
  - Mayor (2016–26): Volker Weber (SPD)

Area
  - Total: 39.68 km^{2} (15.32 sq mi)
- Elevation: 301 m (988 ft)

Population (2025-12-31)
  - Total: 10,243
  - Density: 258.1/km^{2} (668.6/sq mi)
- Time zone: UTC+01:00 (CET)
  - Summer (DST): UTC+02:00 (CEST)
- Postal codes: 66646
- Dialling codes: 06827, 06853
- Vehicle registration: WND
- Website: www.marpingen.de

Marpingen is a municipality in the district of Sankt Wendel, in Saarland, Germany. It is situated approximately 8 km west of Sankt Wendel, and 25 km north of Saarbrücken.

The municipality contains the urban areas Marpingen, Urexweiler, Alsweiler und Berschweiler, which have the status of Ortschaft, and Rheinstraße, which is in the administrative area of Marpingen, and Habenichts, which is in the administrative area of Urexweiler.

== History ==
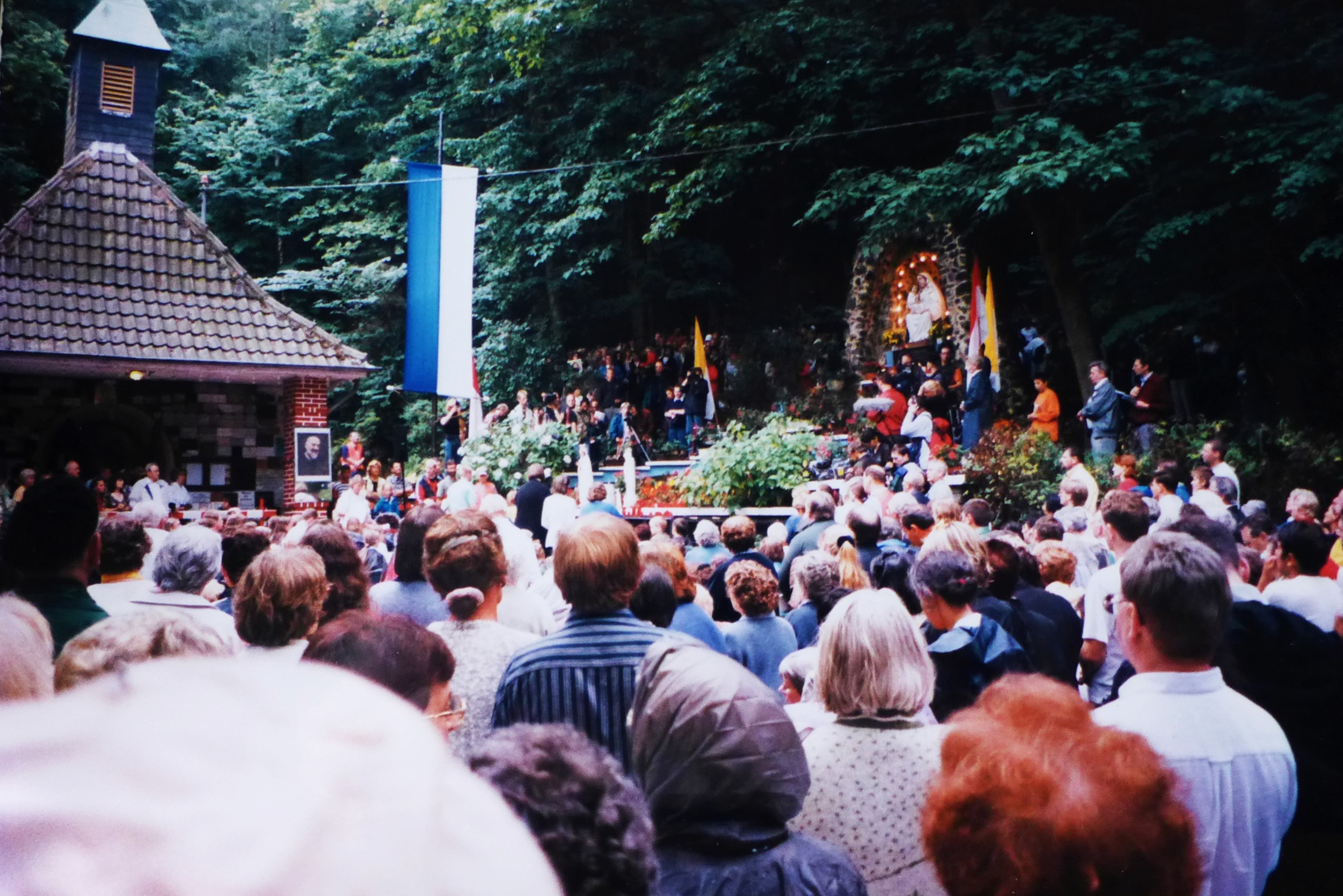
In Marpingen, Germany, Our Lady is said to have appeared several times to three groups of visionaries: in 1876–1877, then in 1934–1936, and in 1999. The investigation performed by the Bishop of Trier after the last apparition concluded in 2005 that "the events in Marpingen cannot be confirmed as being of supernatural origin".

From 1822 to 1946, Marpingen was a part of the Rhine Province in the Kingdom of Prussia. In 1876, at the height of the Kulturkampf, Marpingen was claimed to be the site of an apparition of the Virgin Mary, leading to a major conflict between the Prussian government and the believers who flocked to the municipality as a result.

== See also ==
- Marian apparitions
- Kulturkampf
