= Common Database on Designated Areas =

Database of European protected areas

The Common Database on Designated Areas or CDDA is a data bank for officially designated protected areas such as nature reserves, protected landscapes, national parks etc. in Europe.

The data bank, which went live in 1999, is a community project of the European Environment Agency (EEA) of the Council of Europe and the United Nations Environment Programme World Conservation Monitoring Centre (UNEP-WCMC).

The data bank is divided into a national area and an international area. The national area is for member states of the EU or EEA about the European Environment Information and Observation Network or EIONET. Data cleansing for the national area of non-EEA members and the international area is carried out by UNEP-WCMC systems.

The data bank follows the system of the International Union for Conservation of Nature and Natural Resources (IUCN) and the standards of the United Nations in order to ensure compatibility with similar data banks worldwide, especially the World Database on Protected Areas (WDPA).

The data bank can be accessed from the Internet using the website of the European Nature Information System (EUNIS).

To date, true marine protected areas such as the Marine Protected Areas in the Atlantic Arc (MAIA) have not been included in the data bank. This is being pursued.
