= Oberthal, Saarland =

Oberthal
- Municipality
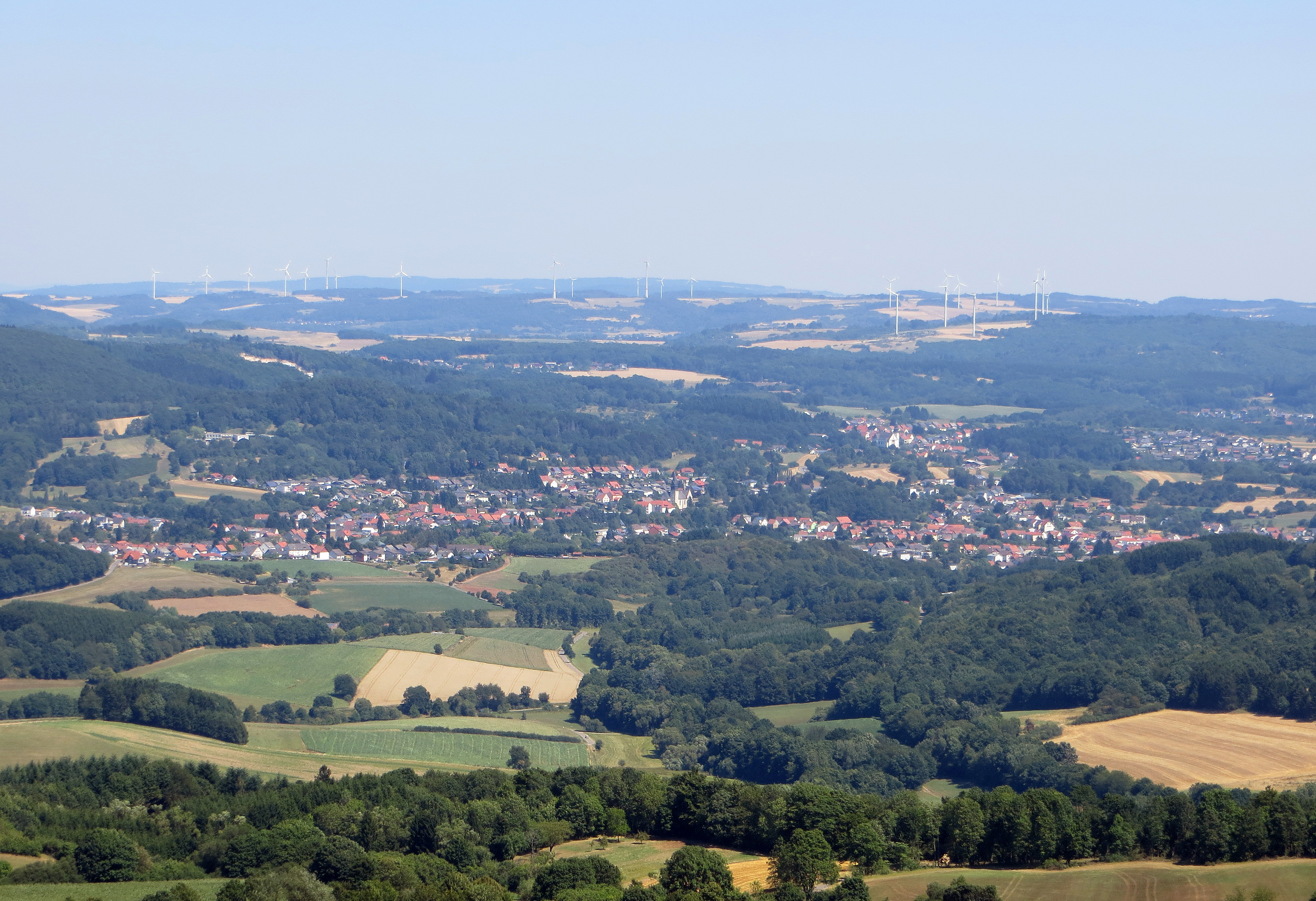
- Oberthal seen from Schaumberg

- Coat of arms

- Location of Oberthal within Sankt Wendel district
- Interactive map of Oberthal
- Location within Germany Location within Saarland
- Coordinates: 49°31′N 7°5′E
- Country: Germany
- State: Saarland
- District: Sankt Wendel
- Subdivisions: 4

Government
  - Mayor (2024–34): Björn Gebauer (SPD)

Area
  - Total: 23.86 km^{2} (9.21 sq mi)
- Elevation: 349 m (1,145 ft)

Population (2025-12-31)
  - Total: 6,045
  - Density: 253.4/km^{2} (656.2/sq mi)
- Time zone: UTC+01:00 (CET)
  - Summer (DST): UTC+02:00 (CEST)
- Postal codes: 66649
- Dialling codes: 06854
- Vehicle registration: WND
- Website: www.oberthal.de

Oberthal is a municipality in the district of Sankt Wendel, in Saarland, Germany. It is situated approximately 7 km northwest of Sankt Wendel, and 35 km north of Saarbrücken.
