= Börfink =

- Municipality
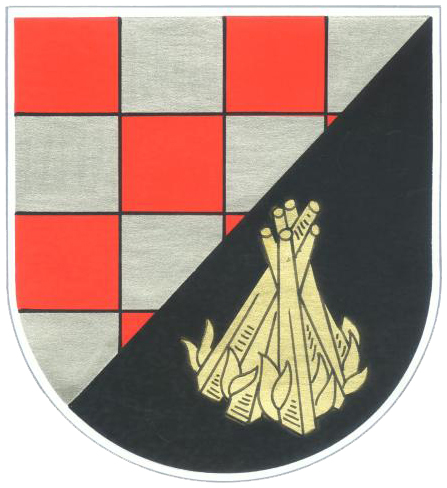
- Coat of arms

- Location of Börfink within Birkenfeld district
- Interactive map of Börfink
- Location within Germany Location within Rhineland-Palatinate
- Coordinates: 49°41′19.45″N 7°4′50.2″E
- Country: Germany
- State: Rhineland-Palatinate
- District: Birkenfeld
- Municipal assoc.: Birkenfeld

Government
  - Mayor (2019–24): Martin Döscher

Area
  - Total: 8.22 km^{2} (3.17 sq mi)
- Elevation: 515 m (1,690 ft)

Population (2025-12-31)
  - Total: 162
  - Density: 19.7/km^{2} (51.0/sq mi)
- Time zone: UTC+01:00 (CET)
  - Summer (DST): UTC+02:00 (CEST)
- Postal codes: 54422
- Dialling codes: 06782
- Vehicle registration: BIR
- Website: www.gemeinde-boerfink.de

Börfink is an Ortsgemeinde – a municipality belonging to a Verbandsgemeinde, a kind of collective municipality – in the Birkenfeld district in Rhineland-Palatinate, Germany. It belongs to the Verbandsgemeinde of Birkenfeld, whose seat is in the like-named town.

== Geography ==
=== Location ===
The municipality lies on the Traunbach near the 816 m-high Erbeskopf in the Schwarzwälder Hochwald (forest) in the Hunsrück. The municipal area is 78.8% wooded.

=== Neighbouring municipalities ===
Börfink borders in the southeast on Abentheuer and in the southwest on Muhl, an outlying centre of Neuhütten.

=== Constituent communities ===
Also belonging to Börfink are the outlying homesteads of Einschiederhof, Forellenhof Trauntal and Thranenweier.

=== Climate ===
Yearly precipitation in Börfink amounts to 1 133 mm, which is very high, falling into the highest tenth of the precipitation chart for all Germany. At 91% of the German Weather Service's weather stations, lower figures are recorded. The driest month is July. The most rainfall comes in December. In that month, precipitation is 1.5 times what it is in July. Precipitation varies markedly. Only at 23% of the weather stations are higher seasonal swings recorded.

== History ==
In the Middle Ages, Börfink belonged to the “Hinder” County of Sponheim, while in Prussian times it belonged to the Trier district.

The Kommandobunker Börfink, also known as Bunker Erwin, was brought into service in 1964. This was, among other things, a secret NATO bunker at the Erbeskopf that was used for air surveillance in Central Europe during the Cold War.

On 1 January 1971, the municipality, which had until this time been called Börfink-Muhl, dropped the second part of its name, and has been known ever since as Börfink.

== Politics ==
=== Municipal council ===
The council is made up of 6 council members, who were elected by majority vote at the municipal election held on 7 June 2009, and the honorary mayor as chairman.

=== Mayor ===
Börfink's mayor is Martin Döscher.

=== Coat of arms ===
The German blazon reads: In schräglinksgeteiltem Schild vorne rot-silber geschacht, hinten in Schwarz ein goldenes Köhlerfeuer.

The municipality's arms might in English heraldic language be described thus: Per bend sinister chequy gules and argent, and sable a charcoal maker's fire Or.

The “chequy” pattern on the dexter (armsbearer's right, viewer's left) side is a reference to the village's former allegiance to the “Hinder” County of Sponheim, Oberamt of Birkenfeld. The charge on the sinister (armsbearer's left, viewer's right) side, the charcoal maker's fire, refers to a legend about the village's founding: On the right bank of the Trau, on what is now Börfink's location, a man named Balduin Hartmann is said to have built the first charcoal-making operation, named Balduinshäuschen after him.

The arms have been borne since 5 September 1972.

== Culture and sightseeing ==
=== Buildings ===
The following are listed buildings or sites in Rhineland-Palatinate’s Directory of Cultural Monuments:

- Dorfstraße 13 – Quereinhaus (a combination residential and commercial house divided for these two purposes down the middle, perpendicularly to the street) with whole-grain mill and inn, 1865, upper floor, 1878

== Economy and infrastructure ==
=== Transport ===
To the east runs Bundesstraße 41, and to the south runs the Autobahn A 62 (Kaiserslautern–Trier). Available in nearby Neubrücke is a railway station on the Nahe Valley Railway (Bingen–Saarbrücken).
