= Tholey =

- Municipality
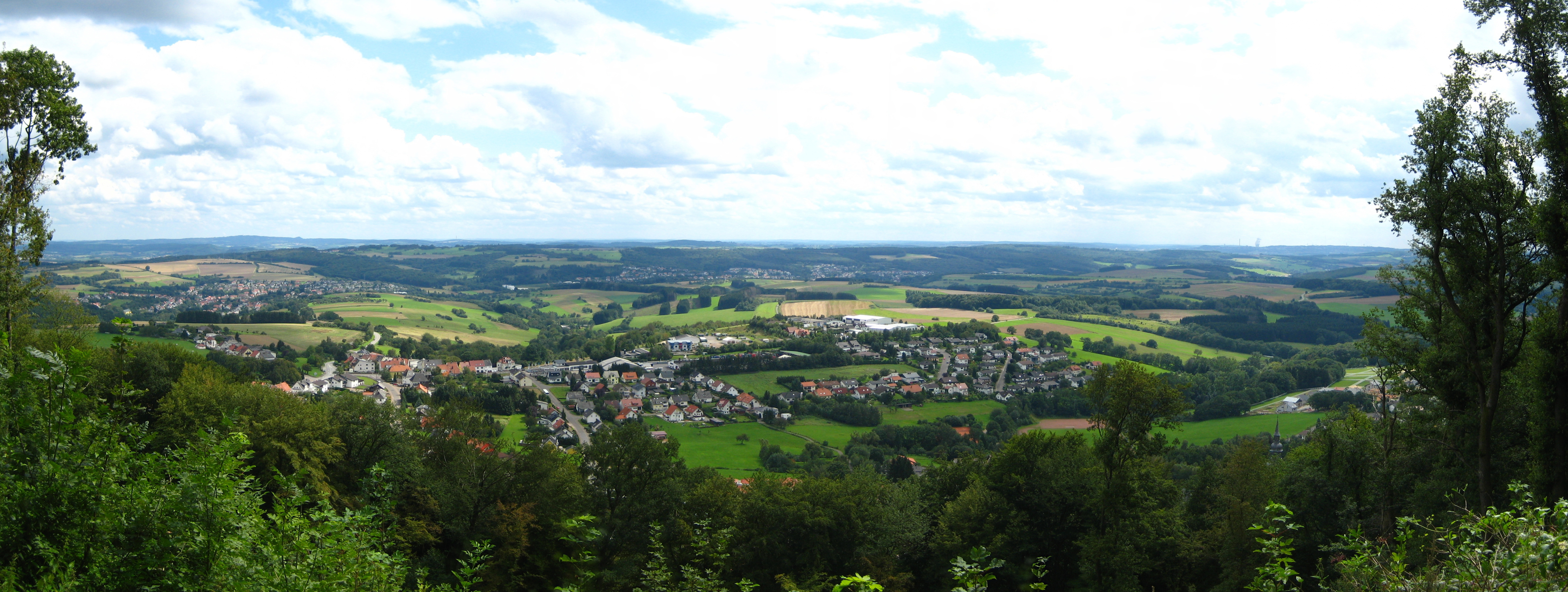
- Tholey seen from the Schaumberg

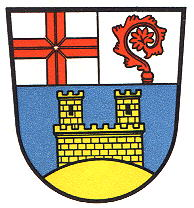
- Coat of arms

- Location of Tholey within St. Wendel district
- Interactive map of Tholey
- Location within Germany Location within Saarland
- Coordinates: 49°28′N 7°2′E
- Country: Germany
- State: Saarland
- District: St. Wendel
- Subdivisions: 9

Government
  - Mayor (2022–32): Andreas Maldener (CDU)

Area
  - Total: 57.56 km^{2} (22.22 sq mi)
- Elevation: 450 m (1,480 ft)

Population (2025-12-31)
  - Total: 12,325
  - Density: 214.1/km^{2} (554.6/sq mi)
- Time zone: UTC+01:00 (CET)
  - Summer (DST): UTC+02:00 (CEST)
- Postal codes: 66630–66636
- Dialling codes: 06853, 06888
- Vehicle registration: WND
- Website: www.tholey.de

Tholey (German pronunciation: [ˈtoːlaɪ]) is a municipality in the district of Sankt Wendel, in Saarland, Germany. It is situated approximately 10 kilometres (6.2 mi) west of Sankt Wendel, and 30 kilometres (19 mi) north of Saarbrücken.

== History ==
=== Local history ===
The first traces of settlement in the area of today's Tholey go back to the Celts. Multiple archaeological finds show an extended occupation by the Romans. In medieval times, much of today's Saarland was tributary to the Abbey of Tholey. To protect the abbey a castle was constructed on the nearby Schaumberg. Tholey was under control of Lorraine and of the Archbishop Prince-elector of Trier.

Tholey is located on the edge of the Schaumberg, the highest mountain in Saarland and the Hunsrück range. The name has been derived from the Celtic *dol(wo) meaning "outstanding", a derivation found also in the name of the neighboring Dollberg hill and in Lorelei (originally Dorley), related to the German toll or doll. "Ley" is a Celtic and Germanic word meaning "cliffs." Tholey is thus "the village on the outstanding cliffs". Given the nearby Gallo-Roman settlement Wareswald alternate derivations of the names Tholey and Theley have been proposed from the Latin word for bricks, tegula or from Castrum teulegium – Linden Fort.

As part of the Saarland's territorial and administrative reforms in 1974 the nine previously independent communities Bergweiler, Hasborn-Dautweiler, Lindscheid, Neipel, Scheuem, Sotzweiler, Theley, Tholey, and Überroth-Niederhofen were consolidated under the name Tholey.

=== Church history ===
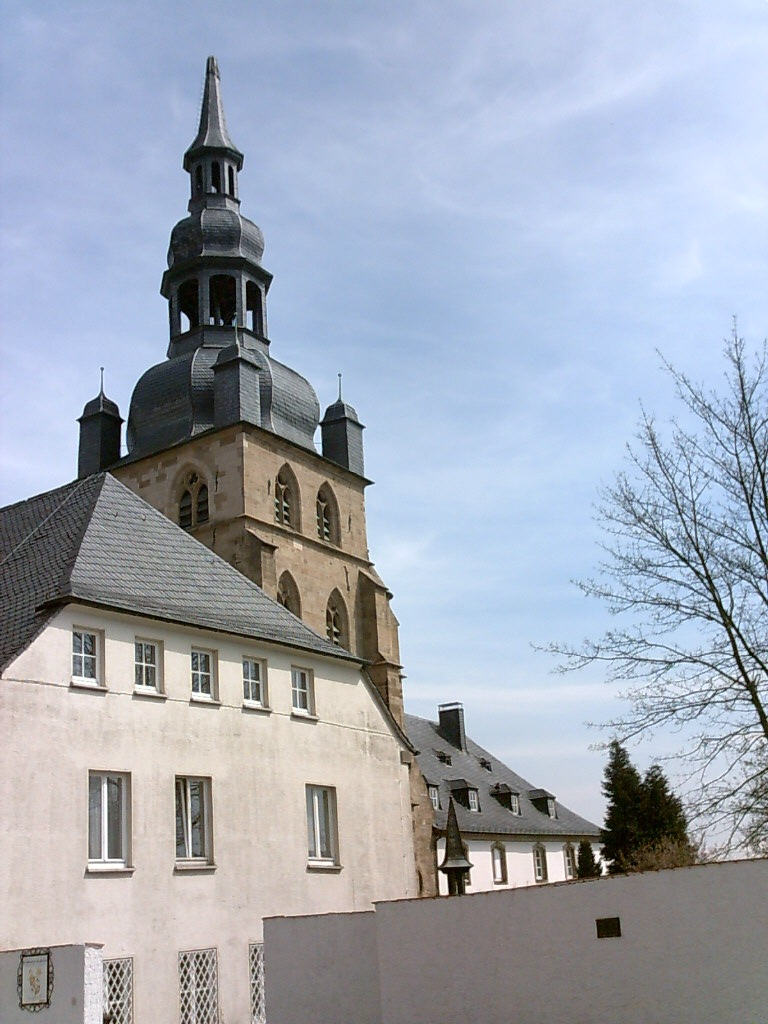
Tholey: Church and Abbey of St. Mauritius

According to legend, around 610 Saint Wendelin of Trier became the founder and first abbot of the Benedictine abbey of Tholey. In 1794 the monastery was plundered and burned by the French and the congregation was dissolved. In 1949 an offshoot of Benedictine monastery of Beuronese Congregation returned and began restoration.

=== Jewish history ===
A Jewish community existed in Tholey from the Eighteenth Century to about 1940. The first Jewish family was identified in 1729. By 1843 88 Jewish people lived in Tholey (9% of the total population of 952 people), by 1895 there were 91. A synagogue was dedicated on December 4, 1863, by District Rabbi Kahn from Trier. A Jewish religious school existed since 1876. In 1925 the Jewish community numbered 50 people; in 1935, 41. Because of the increasing disenfranchisement in the Nazi period and due to the economic boycott many moved to other cities or emigrated. After the deportation at least 20 Jewish inhabitants, either born in Tholey or long-time residents, were murdered. The synagogue was sold in 1937 and later demolished, and a house constructed on its foundation in the Triererstraße.

== Climate ==
Climate data for Tholey (1991–2020 normals)
| Month | Jan | Feb | Mar | Apr | May | Jun | Jul | Aug | Sep | Oct | Nov | Dec | Year |
|---|---|---|---|---|---|---|---|---|---|---|---|---|---|
| Mean daily maximum °C (°F) | 3.4 (38.1) | 4.9 (40.8) | 9.2 (48.6) | 14.0 (57.2) | 18.0 (64.4) | 21.1 (70.0) | 23.5 (74.3) | 23.4 (74.1) | 18.7 (65.7) | 13.2 (55.8) | 7.5 (45.5) | 4.1 (39.4) | 13.4 (56.1) |
| Daily mean °C (°F) | 1.1 (34.0) | 1.9 (35.4) | 5.5 (41.9) | 9.4 (48.9) | 13.2 (55.8) | 16.3 (61.3) | 18.5 (65.3) | 18.2 (64.8) | 14.2 (57.6) | 9.7 (49.5) | 5.0 (41.0) | 1.9 (35.4) | 9.6 (49.3) |
| Mean daily minimum °C (°F) | −1.1 (30.0) | −0.5 (31.1) | 2.1 (35.8) | 5.1 (41.2) | 8.8 (47.8) | 11.8 (53.2) | 13.8 (56.8) | 13.8 (56.8) | 10.3 (50.5) | 6.7 (44.1) | 2.7 (36.9) | −0.1 (31.8) | 6.2 (43.2) |
| Average precipitation mm (inches) | 103.7 (4.08) | 83.8 (3.30) | 78.1 (3.07) | 50.2 (1.98) | 75.9 (2.99) | 71.8 (2.83) | 78.2 (3.08) | 73.4 (2.89) | 72.1 (2.84) | 86.9 (3.42) | 94.1 (3.70) | 122.2 (4.81) | 983.9 (38.74) |
| Average precipitation days (≥ 1.0 mm) | 18.1 | 16.8 | 15.6 | 13.5 | 14.6 | 13.6 | 14.2 | 13.1 | 12.7 | 15.8 | 18.2 | 19.6 | 185.9 |
| Average relative humidity (%) | 88.9 | 83.3 | 75.6 | 68.1 | 70.8 | 70.5 | 68.7 | 70.6 | 76.8 | 84.8 | 90.0 | 90.6 | 78.2 |
| Mean monthly sunshine hours | 49.3 | 74.6 | 129.1 | 186.3 | 210.1 | 216.1 | 231.5 | 216.9 | 164.1 | 100.4 | 48.2 | 40.7 | 1,690.4 |
Source: World Meteorological Organization

== People ==
- Johannes Kühn (1934-2023), writer, born in Tholey
