= Hillfort of Otzenhausen =

Ancient Celtic fortification

Coordinates: 49°37′23″N 7°00′08″E

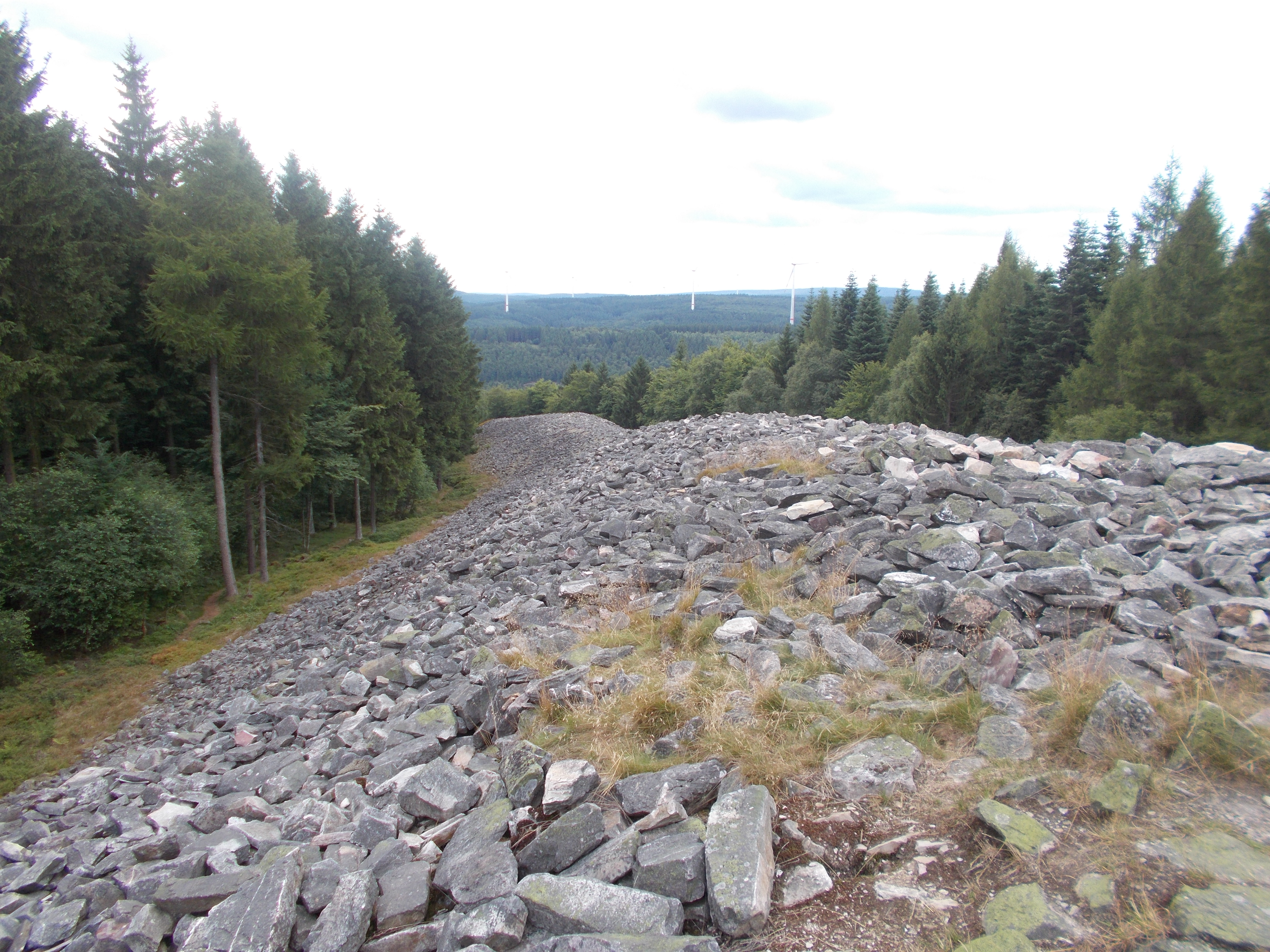
The remains of the walls

The Celtic hill fort of Otzenhausen is one of the biggest fortifications the Celts ever constructed. It was built by the Treveri tribe, who lived in the region north of the fort. The fort is located on top of the Dollberg, a hill near Otzenhausen in Germany, about 695 m above sea level. The only visible remains are two circular earth ramparts, covered with stones.

== History ==
Reconstruction of the wall (See: Murus Gallicus)

In times of war, the circular rampart was a strong fortification against enemies. Theories suggest this one might have been more than just a refuge. There might have been a permanent settlement, a village or the seat of a local leader.

The first fortification was constructed in the 5th or 4th century BC, but the real heyday of construction dates to the 2nd and 1st century BC. For reasons yet unknown, the fort was abandoned shortly after this expansion, in the middle stages of the La Tène culture.

== Description ==
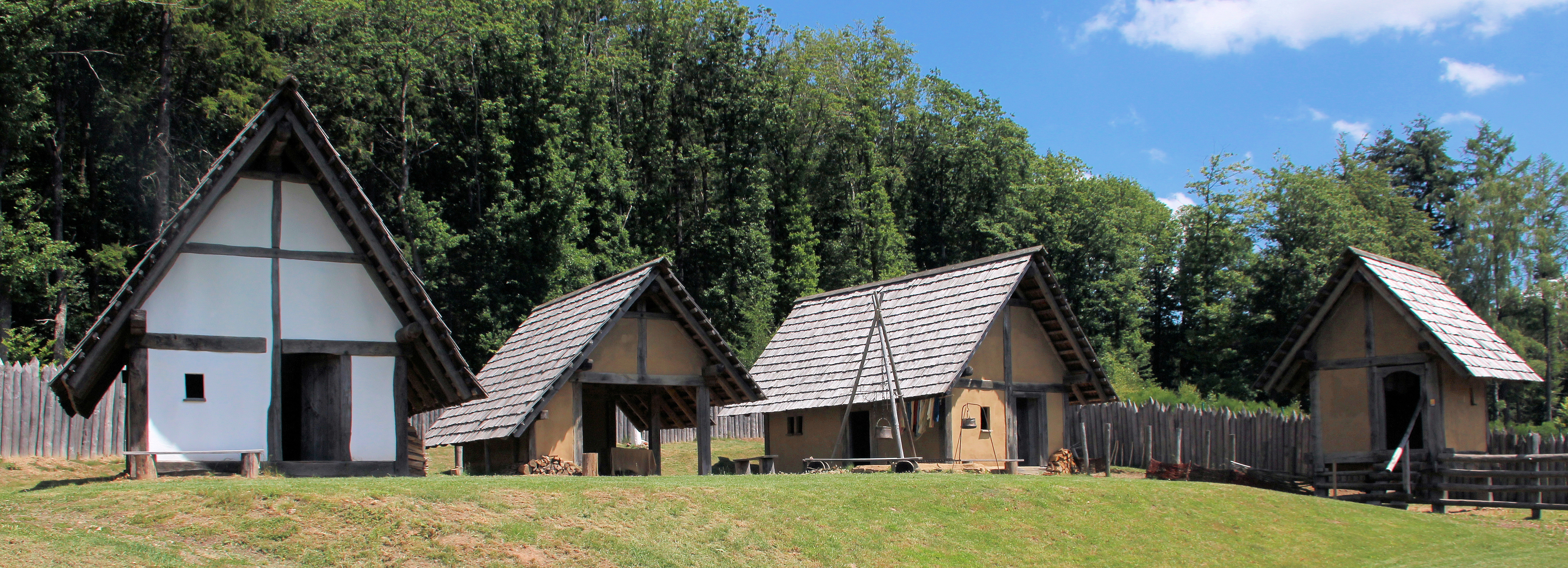
Reconstructed Celtic buildings at Otzenhausen

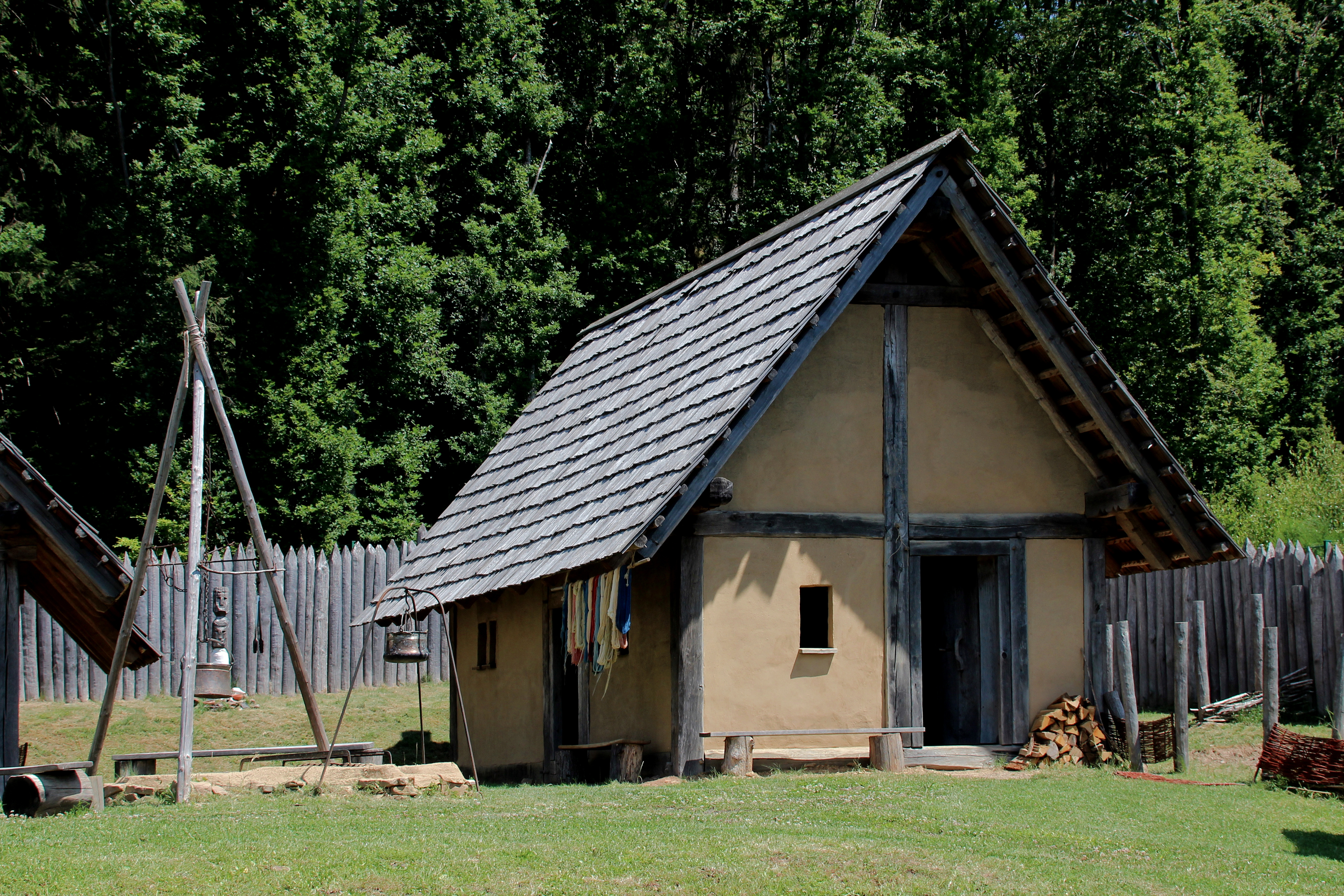
Reconstructed Celtic house at Otzenhausen

The site is formed in the shape of a triangle with rounded ends. One rampart surrounds the whole fort. On the southern side, another similar embankment is built about 40 metres in front of the main one. The ends of this outer rampart approach the main one but do not touch it. Because the entrance of the main rampart is located on the western side, no significant purpose for the outer one has been determined. From west to east the fort extends 460 m, from north to south 647 m. The total length of the ramparts is 2500 metres and they contain 240,000 cubic metres of stone. Thousands of beams were attached to the ramparts which, as the diagram shows, probably presented a vertical stone wall to the exterior.

Julius Caesar describes such ramparts in Book seven, chapter 23 of his Commentaries on the Gallic War:

But this is usually the form of all the Gallic walls. Straight beams, connected lengthwise and two feet distant from each other at equal intervals, are placed together on the ground; these are mortised on the inside, and covered with plenty of earth. But the intervals which we have mentioned, are closed up in front by large stones. These being thus laid and cemented together, another row is added above, in such a manner that the same interval may be observed, and that the beams may not touch one another, but equal spaces intervening, each row of beams is kept firmly in its place by a row of stones. In this manner the whole wall is consolidated, until the regular height of the wall be completed. This work, with respect to appearance and variety, is not unsightly, owing to the alternate rows of beams and stones, which preserve their order in right lines; and, besides, it possesses great advantages as regards utility and the defence of cities; for the stone protects it from fire, and the wood from the battering ram, since it (the wood) being mortised in the inside with rows of beams, generally forty feet each in length, can neither be broken through nor torn asunder.

On the western side, there was a gateway, built of wood, standing on eight posts. This gateway was double-winged and 6 m wide. A central post divided the gateway into two gates of 2.5 m each. The wooden posts sunk into the holes of the gatepost were wedged with stones. Broken rock on the ground prevented the earth from being washed away.

Perhaps there was a second gate on the eastern side, but its existence is not yet proven.

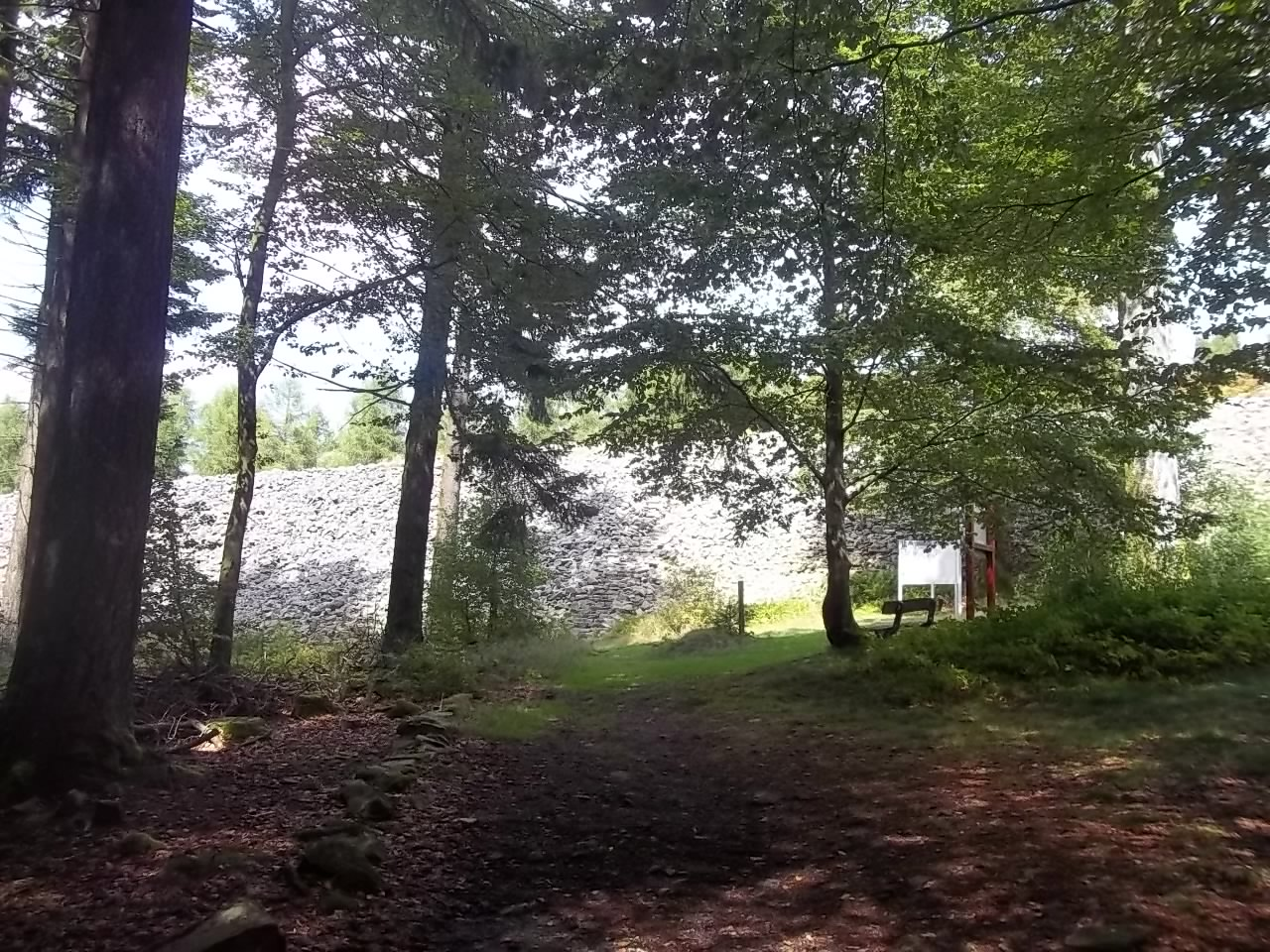
View of the wall remains

From other examples of Celtic forts, it is known that the gateway presumably was a canopied wooden battlement. Because this gateway is built to the inner side of the wall, the ends of the wall and the battlement form a small square, which can be attacked from three sides without leaving cover.

Important for the use of the fort is the existence of a spring on the top of the Dollberg. This spring is a result of the impermeable quartzite the ground consists of.

Holes in the ground, sockets for the wooden posts, prove the existence of buildings. It is unknown whether the buildings' purpose was accommodation or storage.

== Aftermath ==
In the Roman times a small temple of 2.15 x 2.70 metres, dating to the 2nd or 3rd century A.D. was built of quartzite rubble stone and brick-shaped sandstone. When Germanic tribes invaded the Roman territories in 4th century A.D, the fort was used again.

During the Thirty Years War (1618–1648) the inhabitants of the surrounding villages again took refuge in the remains of the Celtic fort.

The first documented appearance of the circular ramparts occurred within the Grimburger Salbuch, a geological register of 1589, the first picture of the enclosure in the Gazette de Metz from 1836.

The same year, Count Villers von Burgesch addressed a petition to the Prussian king Friedrich Wilhelm III to bar the inhabitants of the nearby villages to carry off stones for use as building material. Reacting to this petition the Crown Prince, later King Friedrich Wilhelm IV visited the fort in 1837.

Excavations took place in 1883 and from 1936 to 1939.

== Present ==
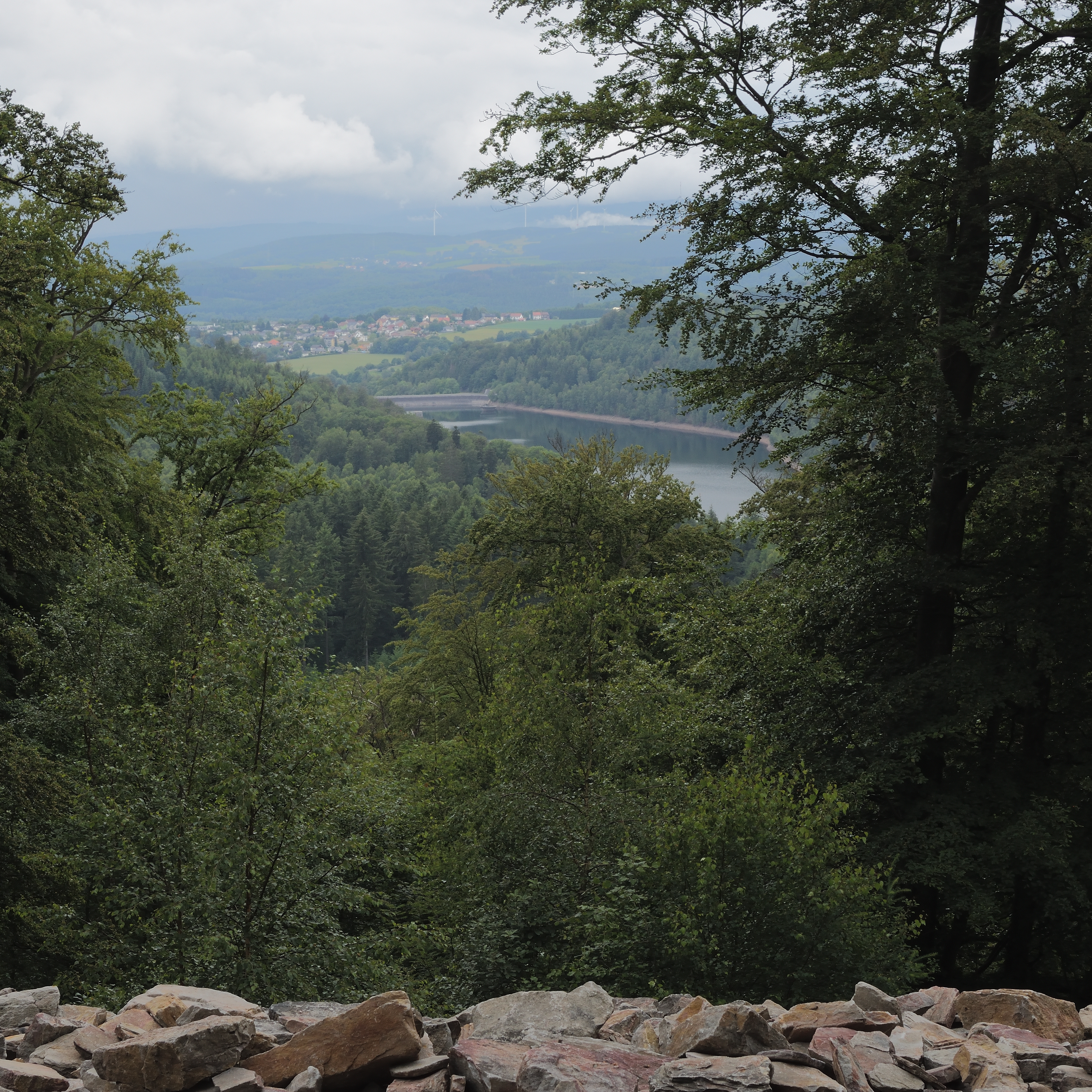
View of the river from the southern wall

The site can be visited all year round, but is without access for handicapped persons. Three information paths lead through the fort:

- A multilingual (D, GB, F, NL) illustrated archaeological information path leads to the most interesting sites of the fortification.
- There is also an adventure and experience path for children with 9 stations.
- The European Path of Sculptures "Cerda&Celtoi" is inspired by Celtic art and culture. The 18 sculptures connect the modern art center of the Europäische Akademie Otzenhausen with the historic center "Hunnenring".

Since 1999 the Terrex GmbH organizes excavations in and around the fortification.

Today the whole area, with the exception of the stone circles, is covered by woods.

== See also ==
- La Tène culture
