= Sankt Wendel (district) =

Coordinates: 49°30′N 7°10′E

- District
- Flag Coat of arms
- Country: Germany
- State: Saarland
- Capital: Sankt Wendel

Government
  - District admin.: Udo Recktenwald (CDU)

Area
  - Total: 476.09 km^{2} (183.82 sq mi)

Population (31 December 2024)
  - Total: 87,813
  - Density: 184.45/km^{2} (477.71/sq mi)
- Time zone: UTC+01:00 (CET)
  - Summer (DST): UTC+02:00 (CEST)
- Vehicle registration: WND (since 1957); OE 8/ OE 18/ OE 28 (1949–1956); SA 08 (1945–1949)
- Website: landkreis-st-wendel.de

Sankt Wendel is a Kreis (district) in the north of the Saarland, Germany. Neighboring districts are Trier-Saarburg, Birkenfeld, Kusel, Neunkirchen, Saarlouis, and Merzig-Wadern.

== History ==
The district was created in 1834 when Prussia bought the Principality of Lichtenberg from Saxe-Coburg. After World War I, the Saar area came under special rulership of the League of Nations as the Territory of the Saar Basin, and thus the Sankt Wendel district was split into two parts. The partition of the district remained in place after the Saar territory was reincorporated into Germany in 1935. In 1937 the north-eastern part, the Restkreis Sankt Wendel, was merged with the Region of Birkenfeld, formerly an exclave of Oldenburg, forming the Birkenfeld district. After World War II the Saar area was once again detached from Germany, this time as the French Saar Protectorate, which included all of the post-WWI territory plus some additional areas to the north; the eastern parts of this additional territory, most of which had come from the Birkenfeld district, were incorporated into Sankt Wendel. The Saar Protectorate was reincorporated into West Germany in 1956 as the Saarland.

== Geography ==
The district is located in the Saar-Hunsrück natural area, a hilly area with elevations between 200 and 600 meters. The main river in the district is the Nahe. The Bostalsee is the biggest tourist lake in the south-west of Germany, covering an area of about 1.2 km^{2}.

== Coat of arms ==
The German blazon reads: Im silber und blau geteilten Schild ein rot bezungter und rot bewehrter Löwe mit gewechselten Farben, belegt mit einem goldenen Herzschild, darin eine rote heraldische Lilie.

The district's arms might in English heraldic language be described thus: Per fess argent and azure a lion rampant counterchanged armed and langued gules surmounted by an inescutcheon Or charged with a fleur-de-lis of the third.

The lion charge is actually to be interpreted as a composite of two lions, with the blue part in the upper field representing the charge borne by the Counts of Veldenz, a branch of the House of Wittelsbach, while the silver part in the lower field represents Nassau-Saarbrücken. The two counties had the most important landholds in the district. The inescutcheon (inset shield) in the middle bears a fleur-de-lis charge taken from the town of Sankt Wendel in tinctures drawn from the arms of Lorraine.

== Towns and municipalities ==
Clickable map of towns and municipalities in the district

Towns
1. Sankt Wendel
Municipalities
1. Freisen
2. Marpingen
3. Namborn
4. Nohfelden

5. Nonnweiler
6. Oberthal
7. Tholey
