= Weiskirchen =

- Municipality
- Coat of arms

- Location of Weiskirchen within Merzig-Wadern district
- Interactive map of Weiskirchen
- Location within Germany Location within Saarland
- Coordinates: 49°33′22″N 6°49′12″E
- Country: Germany
- State: Saarland
- District: Merzig-Wadern
- Subdivisions: 5

Government
  - Mayor (2018–28): Wolfgang Hübschen (CDU)

Area
  - Total: 33.65 km^{2} (12.99 sq mi)
- Elevation: 300–700 m (980–2,300 ft)

Population (2025-12-31)
  - Total: 6,522
  - Density: 193.8/km^{2} (502.0/sq mi)
- Time zone: UTC+01:00 (CET)
  - Summer (DST): UTC+02:00 (CEST)
- Postal codes: 66707–66709
- Dialling codes: 06876
- Vehicle registration: MZG
- Website: www.weiskirchen.de

Weiskirchen (German pronunciation: [vaɪsˈkɪʁçn̩]) is a municipality in the district Merzig-Wadern, in Saarland, Germany. It is situated in the Hunsrück, approx. 20 km northeast of Merzig, and 25 km southeast of Trier.

== Geography ==
=== Districts ===
- Konfeld
- Rappweiler-Zwalbach
- Thailen
- Weierweiler
- Weiskirchen

== Sights ==
In Rappweiler is the "Wild and hiking park Weiskirchen-Rappweiler", whose stock consists mainly of red deer. In the park is also the information center of the Saar-Hunsrück Nature Park with a permanent exhibition.
