= Neuhütten, Rhineland-Palatinate =

Neuhütten
- Municipality
- Coat of arms

- Location of Neuhütten within Trier-Saarburg district
- Interactive map of Neuhütten
- Location within Germany Location within Rhineland-Palatinate
- Coordinates: 49°38′40″N 7°00′59″E
- Country: Germany
- State: Rhineland-Palatinate
- District: Trier-Saarburg
- Municipal assoc.: Hermeskeil
- Subdivisions: 2

Government
  - Mayor (2019–24): Peter Koltes

Area
  - Total: 10.51 km^{2} (4.06 sq mi)
- Elevation: 540 m (1,770 ft)

Population (2025-12-31)
  - Total: 716
  - Density: 68.1/km^{2} (176/sq mi)
- Time zone: UTC+01:00 (CET)
  - Summer (DST): UTC+02:00 (CEST)
- Postal codes: 54422
- Dialling codes: 06503
- Vehicle registration: TR

Neuhütten (German pronunciation: [nɔʏˈhʏtn̩]) is a municipality in the Trier-Saarburg district, in Rhineland-Palatinate, Germany.

Neuhütten is a very active village with many cultural activities. Although the village counts only around 808 inhabitants, you can find about 13 clubs and associations.

The following clubs are active in Neuhütten (Hochwald):

Association/Club	Short description
AWO OV Züsch/Neuhütten	charitable society
FC Züsch/Neuhütten	soccer sports club
FÖV f. Kindergarten & Grundschule	education
Heimatverein Neuhütten	cultural club
Jugendclub Neuhütten	teenage club
Hüttenzauber Turngruppe	gym club
KUKI Kultur- und Karnevalsinitiative	carnival and cultural club
MGV "Germania" Neuhütten	men's sing club
MV Harmonie	music club
Ski-Club Dollberg	ski club
TC Könnigsbachtal	tennis club
Kegelsportclub	skittles club
. Frauengemeinschaft Züsch/Neuhütten	catholic women club

Places of Interest:
Since 2015 Neuhütten is officially placed in the "Hochwald Nationalpark", therefore the surroundings and the forest are recognised as a naturally beautiful area. Beyond the ski cottage, which is opened whenever there is snow, is a nice location to visit as well as the old Forsthaus "Altes Forsthaus" with its horse ranch.
Recently there has been a news team at the Dollberg Neuhütten. You can watch the video at: http://www.ardmediathek.de/

Celebrities:
Klaus Mörsdorf 1909–1989), catholic theologian and canonist

Next exits to the highway:
Otzenhausen approximately 6 km
Hermeskeil approximately 10 km

Distance to bigger cities > 100,000 inhabitants:

Trier: approximately 44 km
Saarbrücken: approximately 56 km
Luxembourg: approximately 85 km
