= Nonnweiler =

- Municipality
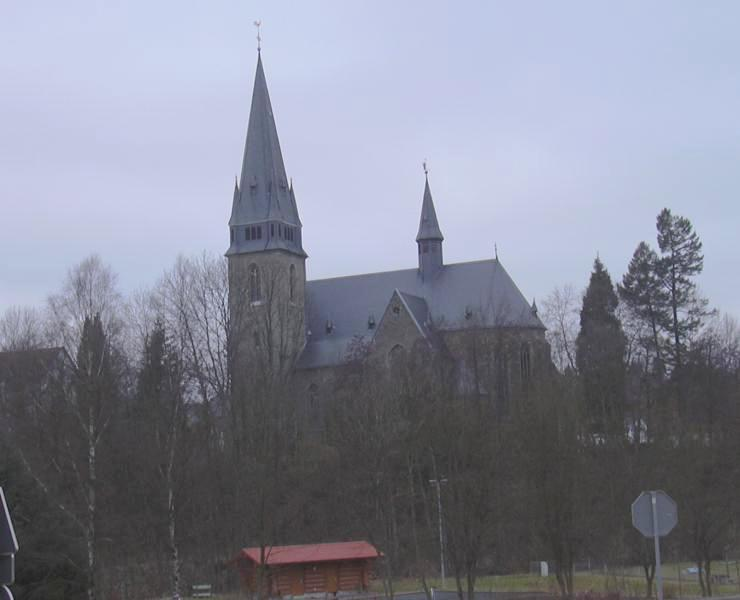

- Coat of arms

- Location of Nonnweiler within Sankt Wendel district
- Interactive map of Nonnweiler
- Location within Germany Location within Saarland
- Coordinates: 49°37′N 6°57′E
- Country: Germany
- State: Saarland
- District: Sankt Wendel
- Subdivisions: 8

Government
  - Mayor (2019–29): Franz-Josef Barth (SPD)

Area
  - Total: 66.4 km^{2} (25.6 sq mi)
- Elevation: 414 m (1,358 ft)

Population (2025-12-31)
  - Total: 8,399
  - Density: 126/km^{2} (328/sq mi)
- Time zone: UTC+01:00 (CET)
  - Summer (DST): UTC+02:00 (CEST)
- Postal codes: 66616–66620
- Dialling codes: 06873
- Vehicle registration: WND
- Website: www.nonnweiler.de

Nonnweiler (German pronunciation: [ˈnɔnvaɪlɐ]) is a municipality in the district of Sankt Wendel, in Saarland, Germany.

== Overview ==
It is situated approximately 20 km northwest of Sankt Wendel, and 30 km southeast of Trier. The village is well known for the "Hillfort of Otzenhausen", a huge wall (former castle) of Celtic origin.
