= Hintertiefenbach =

- Municipality
- Coat of arms

- Location of Hintertiefenbach within Birkenfeld district
- Interactive map of Hintertiefenbach
- Location within Germany Location within Rhineland-Palatinate
- Coordinates: 49°44′26″N 07°21′20″E
- Country: Germany
- State: Rhineland-Palatinate
- District: Birkenfeld
- Municipal assoc.: Herrstein-Rhaunen

Government
  - Mayor (2019–24): Gerd Conzelmann

Area
  - Total: 4.68 km^{2} (1.81 sq mi)
- Elevation: 338 m (1,109 ft)

Population (2025-12-31)
  - Total: 305
  - Density: 65.2/km^{2} (169/sq mi)
- Time zone: UTC+01:00 (CET)
  - Summer (DST): UTC+02:00 (CEST)
- Postal codes: 55743
- Dialling codes: 06784
- Vehicle registration: BIR
- Website: www.hintertiefenbach.de

Hintertiefenbach is an Ortsgemeinde – a municipality belonging to a Verbandsgemeinde, a kind of collective municipality – in the Birkenfeld district in Rhineland-Palatinate, Germany. It belongs to the Verbandsgemeinde Herrstein-Rhaunen, whose seat is in Herrstein.

== Geography ==
The municipality lies north of the river Nahe in a basin. Through it flows the like-named river, the Hintertiefenbach, among whose local tributaries are the Gilzbach, the Bach an der Bismarckeiche, the Waldbach and the Edemisbach. The municipal area measures 4.68 km^{2}, of which 54.3% is wooded. The municipality's elevation is 338 m above sea level.

== History ==
In 1338, Hintertiefenbach had its first documentary mention under the name Inredyfinenbach. The village then belonged, along with the other “abbey municipalities”, Gerach, Göttschied, and Regulshausen (Höhweiler and Ritzenberg) – the last two of which are now outlying centres of Idar-Oberstein – to the Mettlach Monastery. On 14 October 1560, the monastery sold the four villages to the “Hinder” County of Sponheim. The village's name changed over time from the original form to Heredifenbach, Niederdiffenbach, Unterdefenbach and Underdiffenbach.

By 1776, the village belonged to the Margraviate of Baden, and in 1783, serfdom was abolished. Shortly thereafter came the French Revolutionary Wars and then Napoleonic times, when Hintertiefenbach was grouped into the Mairie (“Mayoralty”) of Fischbach in the canton of Herrstein under French rule. After Napoleon's downfall, the Congress of Vienna assigned Hintertiefenbach to the Principality of Birkenfeld, an exclave of the Grand Duchy of Oldenburg, most of whose territory was in what is now northwest Germany, with a coastline on the North Sea.

In 1824, a school system was introduced in the four “abbey municipalities”. In 1879, after the Bürgermeisterei (“Mayoralty”) of Fischbach was dissolved, the village once again belonged to the Amt of Herrstein. A new school was built in 1880. In 1908, watermains were laid, and in 1913 came electricity.

In the time of the Third Reich, after the Reich Law was enacted on 26 January 1937, Hintertiefenbach was transferred from Oldenburg (which then still existed as a territorial unit) to Prussia (which likewise still existed within Germany) with effect from 1 April 1937.

On 19 March 1945, the village was occupied by the United States Army, although by July of the same year, they had yielded their authority to the French. Since 1946, Hintertiefenbach has been part of the then newly founded state of Rhineland-Palatinate.

== Politics ==
=== Municipal council ===
The council is made up of 8 council members, who were elected by majority vote at the municipal election held on 7 June 2009, and the honorary mayor as chairman.

=== Mayors ===
Hintertiefenbach's mayor is Gerd Conzelmann, elected in 2019. The mayoralty has since 1949 been held by the following persons:

- 1949–1952 Albert Brust
- 1952–1964 Paul Mayer
- 1964–1965 Otto Bernhard
- 1966–1969 Albert Brust
- 1969–1979 Jakob Franzmann
- 1979–1999 Ewald Brust
- 1999–2019 Alexander Ebels
- 2019– Gerd Conzelmann

=== Coat of arms ===
The municipality's arms might be described thus: Per bend sinister sable an ear of wheat bendwise sinister surmounted by a miner's lamp, both Or, and chequy gules and argent issuant from base an abbot's staff of the first.

The two charges on the dexter (armsbearer's right, viewer's left) side, the miner's lamp and the ear of wheat, stand for traditional or historical economic mainstays, namely mining and agriculture respectively. The abbot's staff recalls Hintertiefenbach's former membership as one of the “abbey municipalities”, while the “chequy” pattern on the sinister (armsbearer's left, viewer's right) side is a reference to the village's former allegiance to the “Hinder” County of Sponheim.

== Culture and sightseeing ==
=== Clubs ===
- Fußballverein TUS Hintertiefenbach (football)
- Verschönerungsverein Hintertiefenbach (beautification)
- Gemischter Chor Hintertiefenbach (mixed choir)
- Freiwillige Feuerwehr Hintertiefenbach (volunteer fire brigade)

== Economy and infrastructure ==
=== Transport ===
Kreisstraße 37 runs through Hintertiefenbach, while Bundesstraße 41 runs by to the southeast. Serving nearby Weierbach is a railway station on the Nahe Valley Railway (Bingen–Saarbrücken).

=== Pulverloch ===
In earlier times, three copper mines were opened right near the village at a place that came to be known as the Pulverloch. However, because the copper yield from these mines was not very great, they were eventually shut down. It could be that the name – which means “Powder Hole” in German – arose from the common practice of calling mineral deposits such a thing, after the gunpowder used to blast galleries into the rock.

== Famous people ==
=== Sons and daughters of the town ===
- Hugo Mayer (1899–1968), CDU politician and Member of the Bundestag
- Kurt Bohr (1947– ), politician in the Saarland, sport official
