= Schwenker =

German device to grill meat

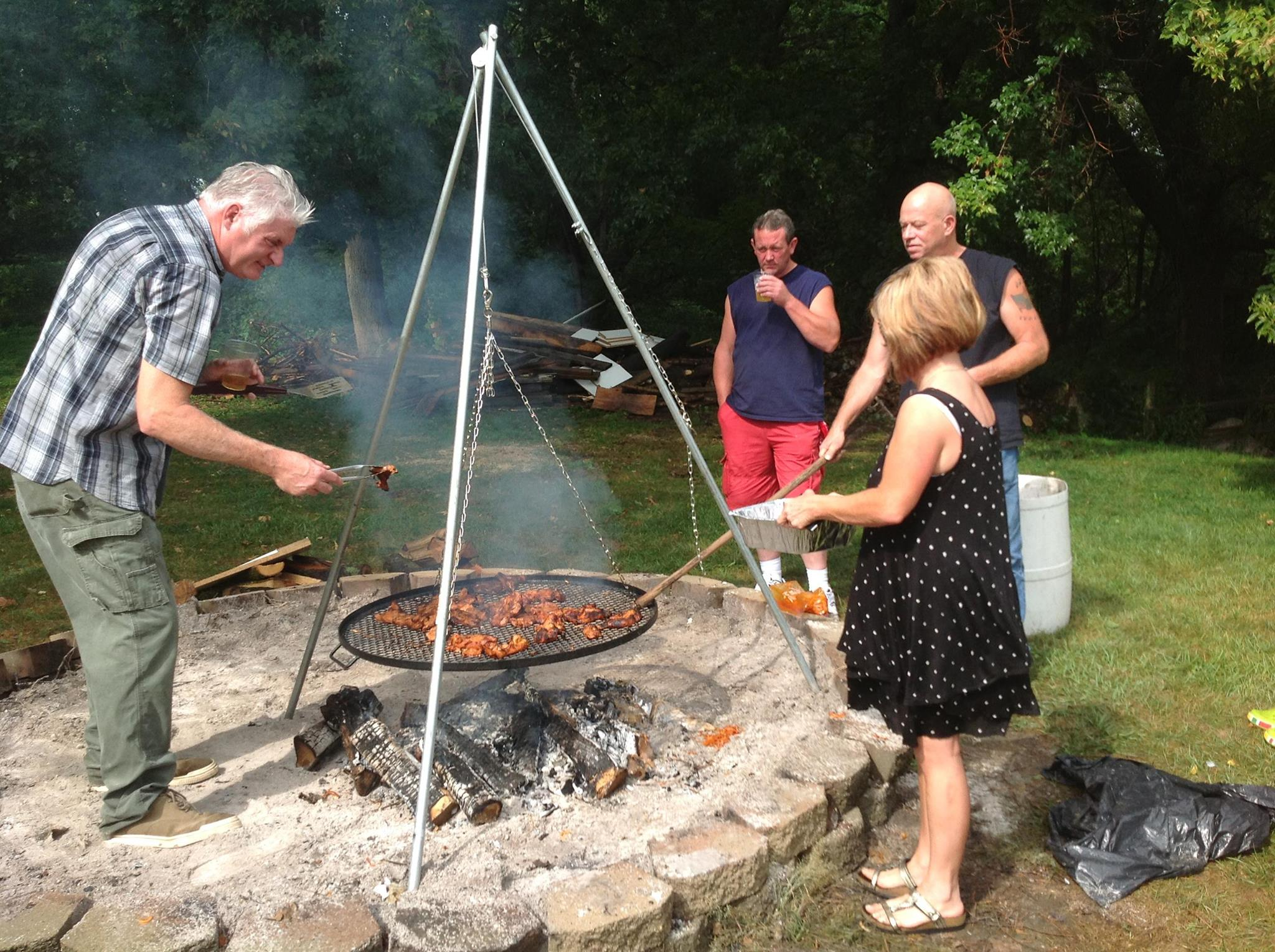
Schwenker crew on duty

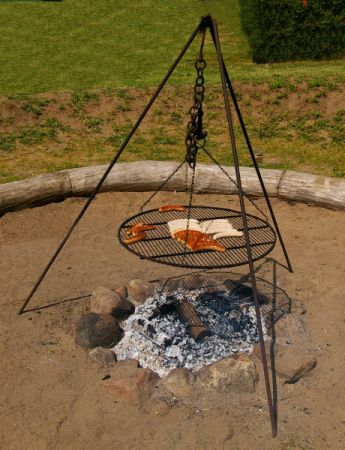
Schwenker tripod from the smithy

Schwenker (German: [ˈʃvɛŋkɐ]) is a local term from the German state of Saarland, the Mosel Valley and big parts of Rheinland Pfalz and is used in three ways, all relating to the same grilled meat:

1. Schwenker or Schwenkbraten is a marinated pork neck steak which originates from the Saarland (known there as Schwenksteak) and is grilled on a schwenker (2). Normally either a green herb or red paprika marinade is used when preparing schwenkbraten. Traditionally, schwenkbraten is made of pork, but turkey variants have also become popular recently. Schwenkbraten are about the size of a hand in length and width and are about 1 cm to 3 cm thick.
2. A schwenker is a grill on which the schwenker steak typically is grilled. A schwenker consists of a fire bowl (or just a camp fire) and a swinging grill hung from a tripod, or sometimes from a gallows-like structure. Impromptu schwenkers can be constructed from various available material, but professionally made schwenkers can be purchased in local supermarkets or DIY stores.
3. The person who operates the schwenker grill is also called Schwenker or less frequently, Schwenkermeister.

Grilling is done over an open beechwood fire. Charcoal is sometimes used, but that is regarded as sub-standard because the beech smoke is considered to be an important part of the process. Gas-fueled grills are almost exclusively used in commercial snack bars).

Beside the schwenker steak, sausages (German bratwurst and French merguez), vegetables (such as bell peppers), Brötchen (German bread rolls, in Saarland preferably Doppelweck, see German cuisine), baguette (French type of bread) with garlic butter, potatoes and feta cheese (the latter three protected in aluminium foil) are often grilled.

Various side salads (usually a pasta (typically fusilli or spiralini) salad, a potato salad and a green salad), and baguette or flutes are served with the schwenker steak. Many prefer specific beers, such as a pils from a local brewery, with their schwenker steak.

== Brief history ==
Map showing the approximate prevalence of the "Schwenken" barbecue style in Germany

Legend has it that this style of cooking came to the region from South America, specifically the Rio Grande do Sul region of Brazil, where it is said that German immigrants took it back home to their region of origin, the Hunsrück area, and Idar-Oberstein in particular. The region's Agate cutters had to travel further afield for their supplies as the local deposits became worked out in the early 19th Century and it is said that they enjoyed the Churrascaria they found in Brazil. The main similarity is that large chunks of meat are cooked over an open fire and served with vegetables.

In Saarland it is believed that the technique became more popular due to the local steel industry, which allowed the workers to construct their schwenker grills easily on their own, from metal parts discarded in steel production. Even today, although steel production in Saarland plays a smaller role than before, it is considered somewhat inappropriate to buy a schwenker in a shop, but rather construct it oneself, preferably from high quality steel varieties, such as V2A steel.

The process of grilling the schwenker is known as “Schwenken”, which not only describes the grilling process itself but also the social event which surrounds the grilling activity. In Saarland, one is not invited to a barbecue, but to a Schwenken.

Today, schwenken is also becoming popular in neighboring Luxembourg, as evidenced by the fact that a Luxembourgian team won the discipline of "Schwenken" in a European barbecue competition in Saarland in 2019.

== Related dishes ==
In the nearby Hunsrück district of Rhineland-Palatinate, the local speciality Spießbraten is often served along with or instead of schwenker. Raw meat, most usually pork neck or loin, but sometimes also beef, is marinated in a mixture of onions, salt and pepper for several hours. The steaks are usually cut to about 3 cm and thus somewhat thicker than the usual pork-neck schwenker. The meat is then roasted over an open beech log fire and served with potatoes and grated radish or seasoned cabbage. This is carried out in a similar manner to schwenker on a large grill resembling a wheel hanging above the fire. The wheel is rotated slowly over the fire to ensure even cooking.

== A dish beyond borders ==
Swinging grills and the aforementioned cuts are gaining popularity. If it's true that the Germans brought it from Brazil, it's also true that Americans brought it back to the U.S.

It is popular at beer festivals and other outdoor events and is also served in local restaurants, frequently accompanied with bratkartoffeln (sliced fried potatoes), onions and sweet cucumber.

For many years the town of Idar-Oberstein hosted an annual Spießbraten festival.
