= Frauenberg, Rhineland-Palatinate =

Frauenberg
- Municipality
- Coat of arms

- Location of Frauenberg within Birkenfeld district
- Interactive map of Frauenberg
- Location within Germany Location within Rhineland-Palatinate
- Coordinates: 49°40′N 7°17′E
- Country: Germany
- State: Rhineland-Palatinate
- District: Birkenfeld
- Municipal assoc.: Baumholder

Government
  - Mayor (2023–24): Karl-Heinz Thom

Area
  - Total: 3.86 km^{2} (1.49 sq mi)
- Elevation: 310 m (1,020 ft)

Population (2025-12-31)
  - Total: 358
  - Density: 92.7/km^{2} (240/sq mi)
- Time zone: UTC+01:00 (CET)
  - Summer (DST): UTC+02:00 (CEST)
- Postal codes: 55776
- Dialling codes: 06787
- Vehicle registration: BIR
- Website: www.frauenberg-nahe.de

Frauenberg is an Ortsgemeinde – a municipality belonging to a Verbandsgemeinde, a kind of collective municipality – in the Birkenfeld district in Rhineland-Palatinate, Germany. It belongs to the Verbandsgemeinde of Baumholder, whose seat is in the like-named town.

== Geography ==
=== Location ===
The municipality lies on the upper Nahe between the Westrich, an historic region that encompasses areas in both Germany and France, and the Hunsrück.

=== Neighbouring municipalities ===
Frauenberg borders in the south on Reichenbach, in the west on Sonnenberg-Winnenberg, in the north on Idar-Oberstein and in the east on the Baumholder military reserve.

== History ==
In early historical times, a road from Ausweiler – a now vanished village that was evacuated to make way for the military reserve in 1937 – passed by the Frauenburg (castle) and through the Nahe, running by way of Oberbrombach, Siesbach and Allenbach to the Moselle. Archaeological finds have established that there was a human presence in the Frauenberg area as early as 500 BC or thereabouts. On the Nahekopf (a hill overlooking Frauenberg) once stood a Celtic ringwall, and it is said that the castle itself was built on the ruins of a Roman fort.

About 1330, Frauenberg had its first documentary mention. It was in this year that Countess Loretta (or Lauretta) von Sponheim moved into the Frauenburg; the castle served her as a widow's seat. Under this Sponheim castle's protection arose the village of Tal-Frauenberg (Tal is German for “dale” or “valley”). By virtue of the Sponheims’ good relations with the then German emperor, Louis the Bavarian, Tal-Frauenberg was granted town rights in 1332, at which time also arose the Amt of Frauenberg, which encompassed not only Tal-Frauenberg, but also Reichenbach, Ausweiler, Winnenberger-Hof, Hammerstein (nowadays an outlying centre of Idar-Oberstein), Homricher-Hof, Nohen and Rimsberg.

However, nothing like a town, as the word is nowadays understood, ever grew out of Tal-Frauenberg. The village merely held more importance than other places in the area because it was the seat of a castle, which itself consisted of a manor house, a castle chapel, the comital mill, a tithe barn and a stone bridge over the Nahe. There was also a Sponheim Amtmann living there.

In 1570, when the village was home to some eight families, the Amt of Frauenberg was dissolved and merged with the Amt of Birkenfeld. The Frauenburg was thus forsaken and left to fall into ruin, having lost its military importance with territorial changes and the rise of firearms, serving thereafter only as a refuge where the local people could flee and seek shelter in times of war.

The parish of Reichenbach mentioned in 1655 that after the Thirty Years' War (1618–1648), no-one was living in Tal-Frauenberg. The Niederbrombach church book mentioned in 1673 that French soldiers had attacked the castle, where inhabitants of surrounding villages had sought refuge. Several men were apparently killed. It is furthermore likely that the castle itself was heavily damaged in this attack.

In 1682, there were once again people living in Tal-Frauenberg, although it was only three families. In 1761, Tal-Frauenberg was stricken by a great flood, brought on by several heavy storms. The flooding destroyed most of the houses and made the ones it left standing unfit for use. The population by this time was made up of 20 families – some 100 persons, who were now all homeless. Thus it was that the Hochfürstlich Sponheimische Gemeinschaftliche Regierung (the Sponheim government) at Trarbach decided to found two new villages. A group of 11 families were to be settled in Neu-Frauenberg (neu is German for “new”), while the other nine families were to be settled on the Sonnenberg (mountain). The government required that both new villages be built halfway up the slopes at their respective locations, to forestall any threat from flooding such as that that had destroyed Tal-Frauenberg. This was duly done, and to this day, both centres lie on slopes.

Land had to be shared out at the new locations, and this was done by drawing lots. Farm lots were measured and pegged out. At Neu-Frauenberg, each one measured 4 × 4 Ruten, while at Sonnenberg they measured 10 × 4 Ruten, a Rute being the local version of the linear rood; a square Rute at that time ranged from 32 to 39 m^{2}. The new arrangement's consequences were that they only slowly recovered and began growing, and poverty and hardship reigned for a long time. By 1816, there were 19 families living in Frauenberg.

Of the old village of Tal-Frauenberg, three houses are still standing in the ruins.

After the Congress of Vienna in 1815, Sonnenberg belonged to the Principality of Birkenfeld, an Oldenburg territory, whereas Frauenberg belonged to the Principality of Lichtenberg, held by Saxe-Coburg, with its capital at Sankt Wendel. This put the two sister villages in two separate states and made the river Nahe, which at the time the two new villages had been established had been designated the municipal boundary, into a border.

In 1834, Frauenberg became Prussian. Economic progress in the village came only with the onset of the Industrial Revolution. Sometime around 1850, the two grinding mills on the river Nahe west of the village came into being, but these were torn down between 1931 and 1935.

With the opening of the Nahe Valley Railway (Bingen–Saarbrücken) in 1860 – single-tracked until 1882 – came transport links for the first time between the Nahe Valley and both the Frankfurt Rhine Main Region and the Saarland. In 1880, Sonnenberg station came into service, whereupon many Frauenbergers found work in Idar-Oberstein, the Saarland and the Frankfurt Rhine Main Region. This also brought about population growth: by 1910 there were 51 families. After the First World War, electricity came to Frauenberg, allowing many agate, gem and diamond cutters to set up their workshops at home.

The upshot from the First World War, of course, was the Treaty of Versailles, which stipulated, among other things, that 26 of the Sankt Wendel district's 94 municipalities – including the like-named district seat but not including Frauenberg – had to be ceded to the British- and French-occupied Saarland. The remaining 68 municipalities then bore the designation “Restkreis St. Wendel-Baumholder”, with the first syllable of Restkreis having the same meaning as in English, in the sense of “left over”. As the last element of the name suggests, Baumholder was the seat of this “leftover” district. This situation persisted until 1937 when St. Wendel-Baumholder was merged with the Oldenburg territory of Birkenfeld to form today's Birkenfeld district. With this, Sonnenberg and Frauenberg were once again united under the name Birkenfeld, as they had once been centuries earlier. In 1938, Frauenberg lost roughly 40 ha of its municipal area to the new military reserve.

The municipality of Frauenberg originally belonged to the Amt administration of Baumholder, but since 1969, it has been one of the 14 Ortsgemeinden in the Verbandsgemeinde of Baumholder. Unlike other municipalities in the Verbandsgemeinde, Frauenberg's population has undergone steady growth since the war, rising from 356 in 1950 to some 500 in 1986. This owes itself mainly to relatively strong activity in the building sector beginning in 1972 and the municipality's favourable location only 7 km from Idar-Oberstein.

In 1979, Frauenberg brought the first modern biological sewage treatment plant in the Verbandsgemeinde into service. The village's expansion also occasioned the updating of sewerage with new, bigger pipes.

== Politics ==
=== Municipal council ===
The council is made up of 8 council members, who were elected by majority vote at the municipal election held on 7 June 2009, and the honorary mayor as chairman.

=== Mayor ===
Frauenberg's mayor since April 2023 is Karl-Heinz Thom.

=== Coat of arms ===
The municipality's arms might be described thus: Per bend sinister chequy gules and argent and vert issuant from base a castle Or masoned and windowed sable and sinister a countess proper crowned of the fourth and crined of the fifth couped at the midriff.

The “chequy” part of the shield is a reference to the village's former allegiance to the “Hinder” County of Sponheim and the Oberamt of Birkenfeld.

The two charges in base are canting for the origin of the municipality's name, a lady (Frau) and a castle (Burg). The lady in question, of course, is the one who financed and moved into the castle, the aforementioned Countess Loretta (or Lauretta) von Sponheim-Starkenburg, and the castle was called "Frauenburg" (not Frauenberg with an "e", which is pronounced differently and means "Lady's Mountain" rather than "Lady’s Castle").

== Culture and sightseeing ==
=== Buildings ===
The following are listed buildings or sites in Rhineland-Palatinate’s Directory of Cultural Monuments:

- Railway bridge on the Nahe Valley Railway – three-arch bridge built of sandstone quarrystones set with brick over the Nahe valley, about 1860
- Frauenburg ruin, south of the village on a narrow mountain spur (monumental zone) – small, regular complex, possibly from the early 14th century; girding wall, four round corner towers, round tower in northeast wall, cellar with twin halls, partial moat, nested walls. (

An earlier version of this article falsely identified this Frauenburg with that built by Sophie of Brabant.

== Economy and infrastructure ==
=== Transport ===
To the north runs Bundesstraße 41 and to the south runs the Autobahn A 62 (Kaiserslautern–Trier). There is a railway station on the Nahe Valley Railway (Bingen–Saarbrücken) in Idar-Oberstein.

=== Economy ===
The jewellery industry is still an important sector of the municipality's economy, subject though it may be to structural changes to which small and family-run operations have fallen victim. Agriculture has since the early 1970s been unknown in Frauenberg. The loss of a great deal of farmland to the military reserve in the time of the Third Reich and the rather vast proportion of the municipal area (roughly 65%) covered by forest have not favoured agriculture.
