= Schmißberg =

- Municipality
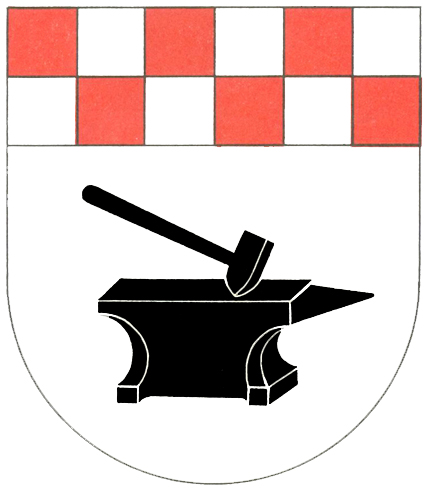
- Coat of arms

- Location of Schmißberg within Birkenfeld district
- Interactive map of Schmißberg
- Location within Germany Location within Rhineland-Palatinate
- Coordinates: 49°40′3″N 7°12′24″E
- Country: Germany
- State: Rhineland-Palatinate
- District: Birkenfeld
- Municipal assoc.: Birkenfeld

Government
  - Mayor (2019–24): Thomas Marx

Area
  - Total: 1.68 km^{2} (0.65 sq mi)
- Elevation: 430 m (1,410 ft)

Population (2025-12-31)
  - Total: 206
  - Density: 123/km^{2} (318/sq mi)
- Time zone: UTC+01:00 (CET)
  - Summer (DST): UTC+02:00 (CEST)
- Postal codes: 55765
- Dialling codes: 06782
- Vehicle registration: BIR
- Website: www.schmissberg.de

Schmißberg (or Schmissberg) is an Ortsgemeinde – a municipality belonging to a Verbandsgemeinde, a kind of collective municipality – in the Birkenfeld district in Rhineland-Palatinate, Germany. It belongs to the Verbandsgemeinde of Birkenfeld, whose seat is in the like-named town.

== Geography ==
=== Location ===
The nearest major town to Schmißberg is the district seat of Birkenfeld some three kilometres to the southwest.

=== Neighbouring municipalities ===
Schmißberg borders in the north on the municipality of Elchweiler, in the east on the municipality of Niederhambach, in the south on the municipality of Rimsberg and in the south and southwest on the town of Birkenfeld.

== History ==
In 1367, Schmißberg had its first documentary mention in the taxation book kept by the Counts of Sponheim. Nevertheless, various archaeological finds of Roman graves in the vicinity bear witness to settlers here at a much earlier time. Schmißberg belonged to the “Hinder” County of Sponheim.

== Politics ==
=== Municipal council ===
The council is made up of 6 council members, who were elected by majority vote at the municipal election held on 7 June 2009, and the honorary mayor as chairman.

=== Mayor ===
Schmißberg’s mayor is Rudolf Weber.

=== Coat of arms ===
The municipality’s arms might be described thus: Argent an anvil, the horn to sinister, and a blacksmith’s hammer bendwise, the crosspeen resting on the anvil, all sable, the chief countercompony gules and argent.

The countercompony (that is, two rows of squares of alternating tinctures) chief is a reference to the village’s former allegiance to the Counts of Sponheim, who for centuries ruled the “Hinder” County of Sponheim, and bore arms that were “chequy” (similar, but with more than two rows), while the hammer and anvil are canting for the first syllable in the municipality’s name (Schmiß– comes from the base of Schmiede, meaning “smithy”).

== Culture and sightseeing ==
=== Buildings ===
The following are listed buildings or sites in Rhineland-Palatinate’s Directory of Cultural Monuments:

- Beside Hauptstraße 3 – running well, sandstone trough, cast-iron well column, marked 1871
- Near Hauptstraße 9 – Gothic Revival cast-iron running well, late 19th century

=== Sport and leisure ===
Hiking trails offer the opportunity for a view of the Erbeskopf, which at 816 m above sea level is Rhineland-Palatinate’s highest peak.

== Economy and infrastructure ==
=== Transport ===
Running west of the municipality is Bundesstraße 41, which to the south leads to the Autobahn A 62 (Kaiserslautern–Trier). Serving nearby Nohen is a railway station on the Nahe Valley Railway (Bingen–Saarbrücken).
