= Sonnenberg-Winnenberg =

- Municipality
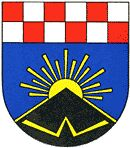
- Coat of arms

- Location of Sonnenberg-Winnenberg within Birkenfeld district
- Interactive map of Sonnenberg-Winnenberg
- Location within Germany Location within Rhineland-Palatinate
- Coordinates: 49°40′23″N 7°16′49″E
- Country: Germany
- State: Rhineland-Palatinate
- District: Birkenfeld
- Municipal assoc.: Birkenfeld

Government
  - Mayor (2021–29): Frank Robbert

Area
  - Total: 2.87 km^{2} (1.11 sq mi)
- Elevation: 400 m (1,300 ft)

Population (2025-12-31)
  - Total: 435
  - Density: 152/km^{2} (393/sq mi)
- Time zone: UTC+01:00 (CET)
  - Summer (DST): UTC+02:00 (CEST)
- Postal codes: 55767
- Dialling codes: 06787
- Vehicle registration: BIR

Sonnenberg-Winnenberg (German pronunciation: [ˈzɔnənbɛʁk ˈvɪnənbɛʁk]) is an Ortsgemeinde – a municipality belonging to a Verbandsgemeinde, a kind of collective municipality – in the Birkenfeld district in Rhineland-Palatinate, Germany. It belongs to the Verbandsgemeinde of Birkenfeld, whose seat is in the like-named town.

== Geography ==
=== Location ===
The “double” municipality lies on the river Nahe.

=== Neighbouring municipalities ===
Sonnenberg-Winnenberg borders in the north on the municipality of Oberbrombach, in the northeast on the town of Idar-Oberstein, in the east and south on the municipality of Frauenberg, in the southwest on the municipality of Kronweiler and in the west on the municipality of Niederbrombach.

=== Constituent communities ===
Sonnenberg-Winnenberg’s Ortsteile are, as its double name suggests, Sonnenberg and Winnenberg. Also belonging to Sonnenberg-Winnenberg are the outlying homesteads of Birkensiedlung, Hohensteiner Hof and Schlesierhof.

== Politics ==
=== Municipal council ===
The council is made up of 12 council members, who were elected by majority vote at the municipal election held on 7 June 2009, and the honorary mayor as chairman.

=== Mayor ===
Sonnenberg-Winnenberg’s mayor is Frank Robbert.

=== Coat of arms ===
The German blazon reads: Unter rot-silbern geschachtem Schildhaupt in Blau eine aufsteigende schwarze Spitze, belegt mit einem goldenem ‚W‘, im Feld eine goldene durch die Spitze begrenzte Sonne.

The municipality’s arms might in English heraldic language be described thus: Azure the sun Or rising from behind a pile transposed sable, itself charged with the letter W of the second, the chief countercompony gules and argent.

The chief with its countercompony pattern (that is, with two chequered rows) is a reference to the village’s former allegiance to the “Hinder” County of Sponheim, Oberamt of Birkenfeld, while the “pile transposed” (that is, wedge-shaped charge stretching up from the base instead of down from the chief) and the sun behind it are a canting composition for one constituent community’s name, Sonnenberg, whose name in German means “Sun Mountain”. The W stands for Winnenberg.

The arms have been borne since 28 February 1963.

== Economy and infrastructure ==
=== Transport ===
Running to the northwest of the municipality is Bundesstraße 41, which towards the south leads to the Autobahn A 62 (Kaiserslautern–Trier). Serving nearby Kronweiler is a railway station on the Nahe Valley Railway (Bingen–Saarbrücken). There has been no railway station in Sonnenberg-Winnenberg itself since Sonnenberg station was closed in 1963.
