= Ellenberg, Rhineland-Palatinate =

Ellenberg
- Municipality
- Coat of arms

- Location of Ellenberg within Birkenfeld district
- Interactive map of Ellenberg
- Location within Germany Location within Rhineland-Palatinate
- Coordinates: 49°39′34″N 7°08′54″E
- Country: Germany
- State: Rhineland-Palatinate
- District: Birkenfeld
- Municipal assoc.: Birkenfeld

Government
  - Mayor (2019–24): Detlef Kamzela

Area
  - Total: 2.02 km^{2} (0.78 sq mi)
- Elevation: 380 m (1,250 ft)

Population (2025-12-31)
  - Total: 88
  - Density: 44/km^{2} (110/sq mi)
- Time zone: UTC+01:00 (CET)
  - Summer (DST): UTC+02:00 (CEST)
- Postal codes: 55765
- Dialling codes: 06782
- Vehicle registration: BIR

Ellenberg (German pronunciation: [ˈɛlənbɛʁk]) is an Ortsgemeinde – a municipality belonging to a Verbandsgemeinde, a kind of collective municipality – in the Birkenfeld district in Rhineland-Palatinate, Germany. It belongs to the Verbandsgemeinde of Birkenfeld, whose seat is in the like-named town.

== Geography ==
=== Location ===
The municipality lies a few hundred metres northwest of the district seat of Birkenfeld in the Hunsrück. To the west lies Buhlenberg and to the north lie Rinzenberg and Gollenberg.

== History ==
In 1367, Ellenberg had its first documentary mention in connection with four Sponheim Vogt officials. Versions of the name offered up by history include Elnberg in 1415 and Ellemberg in 1438. The village belonged to the “Hinder” County of Sponheim.

In 2004, Ellenberg finally shed its distinction as the smallest municipality in the Verbandsgemeinde of Birkenfeld. It is now the second smallest with a population in that year of 101.

== Politics ==
=== Municipal council ===
The council is made up of 6 council members, who were elected by majority vote at the municipal election held on 7 June 2009, and the honorary mayor as chairman.

=== Mayor ===
Ellenberg's mayor is Detlef Kamzela.

=== Coat of arms ===
The German blazon reads: Im schräglinks geteilten Schild vorne rot-silbern geschacht, hinten in Grün ein liegender goldener Hammer, darüber drei schräggestellte goldene Ähren.

The municipality's arms might in English heraldic language be described thus: Per bend sinister chequy of gules and argent and vert three ears of wheat bendwise in bend sinister and in base a hammer fesswise, all Or.

The “chequy” pattern on the dexter (armsbearer's right, viewer's left) side is a reference to the village's former allegiance to the “Hinder” County of Sponheim, Oberamt of Birkenfeld. The charges on the sinister (armsbearer's left, viewer's right) side refer to the village's primary industries: the hammer to the iron deposit within municipal limits and the ears of wheat to the agriculture that was formerly intensively pursued.

== Culture and sightseeing ==
=== Buildings ===
The following are listed buildings or sites in Rhineland-Palatinate’s Directory of Cultural Monuments:

- Across from house no. 11 – cast-iron Gothic Revival fountain, late 19th century

== Economy and infrastructure ==
=== Transport ===
Through the village runs Bundesstraße 269, which southwards leads to the Autobahn A 62 (Kaiserslautern–Trier). Serving nearby Neubrücke is a railway station on the Nahe Valley Railway (Bingen–Saarbrücken).
