= Dambach, Germany =

Dambach
- Municipality
- Coat of arms

- Location of Dambach within Birkenfeld district
- Interactive map of Dambach
- Location within Germany Location within Rhineland-Palatinate
- Coordinates: 49°37′38.13″N 7°7′57.41″E
- Country: Germany
- State: Rhineland-Palatinate
- District: Birkenfeld
- Municipal assoc.: Birkenfeld

Government
  - Mayor (2019–24): Nadine Schmitt

Area
  - Total: 2.98 km^{2} (1.15 sq mi)
- Elevation: 425 m (1,394 ft)

Population (2025-12-31)
  - Total: 144
  - Density: 48.3/km^{2} (125/sq mi)
- Time zone: UTC+01:00 (CET)
  - Summer (DST): UTC+02:00 (CEST)
- Postal codes: 55765
- Dialling codes: 06782
- Vehicle registration: BIR

Dambach (pronounced [ˈdambax]) is an Ortsgemeinde – a municipality belonging to a Verbandsgemeinde, a kind of collective municipality – in the Birkenfeld district in Rhineland-Palatinate, Germany. It belongs to the Verbandsgemeinde of Birkenfeld, whose seat is in the like-named town.

== Geography ==
=== Location ===
The municipality lies in the Schwarzwälder Hochwald (forest) in the Hunsrück some 3 km southwest of the district seat of Birkenfeld.

=== Neighbouring municipalities ===
Dambach borders in the south on the municipality of Ellweiler, in the west on the municipality of Achtelsbach and in the northwest on the municipality of Brücken. All these places lie within the Birkenfeld district.

=== Constituent communities ===
Also belonging to Dambach is the outlying homestead of Brandmühle.

== History ==
As witnessed by archaeological finds, the Birkenfelder Land was already settled 3,000 years ago. A great number of finds made at barrows, especially from the Iron Age, may be seen at the Birkenfelder Landesmuseum (“Birkenfeld State Museum”). In the latter half of the 1st century BC, the area was conquered by the Romans and remained under their hegemony for roughly 400 years. Roman culture has left its mark to this day.

== Politics ==
=== Municipal council ===
The council is made up of 6 council members, who were elected by majority vote at the municipal election held on 7 June 2009, and the honorary mayor as chairman.

=== Mayor ===
Dambach's mayor is Nadine Schmitt.

=== Coat of arms ===
The German blazon reads: In durch schwarzen Pfahl gespaltenem Schild vorne in Silber über blauem, schräglinkem Wellenbalken ein schwarzes Wasserrad, hinten der Hunolstein’sche Schild: in Gold zwei rote Balken begleitet von 12 (5:4:2:1) roten Steinen, halb.

The municipality's arms might in English heraldic language be described thus: An endorse sable between, dimidiated, argent a bend sinister wavy with a waterwheel spoked of six in dexter chief of the first, and the Hunolstein escutcheon: Or two closets among twelve cubes, five in fess in chief, four in fess between and three in base, all gules.

The waterwheel charge on the dexter (armsbearer's right, viewer's left) side recalls the Brandmühle on the Traunbach, an old gem polishing mill that was torn down to make way for the Traunbach valley road. The wavy bend on the same side is canting for the municipality's name, at least for the last syllable (Bach means “brook” in German). The pattern on the sinister (armsbearer's left, viewer's right) side refers to the former holders of the Vogtei of Achtelsbach, to which Dambach belonged.

The arms have been borne since 14 October 1964.

== Culture and sightseeing ==
Buildings: The following are listed buildings or sites in Rhineland-Palatinate’s Directory of Cultural Monuments:

- Hauptstraße 1 – former school; five-axis, one-floor building with half-hipped roof, 1841, addition 1911
- In der Grub 1 – residential part of a former Quereinhaus (a combination residential and commercial house divided for these two purposes down the middle, perpendicularly to the street), partly timber-frame, partly slated, 1752

== Economy and infrastructure ==
=== Transport ===
The Autobahn A 62 (Kaiserslautern–Trier) lies 4 km away. Serving nearby Neubrücke is a railway station on the Nahe Valley Railway, likewise 4 km away.
