= Reichenbach, Birkenfeld =

Reichenbach
- Municipality
- Coat of arms

- Location of Reichenbach within Birkenfeld district
- Interactive map of Reichenbach
- Location within Germany Location within Rhineland-Palatinate
- Coordinates: 49°39′N 07°17′E
- Country: Germany
- State: Rhineland-Palatinate
- District: Birkenfeld
- Municipal assoc.: Baumholder

Government
  - Mayor (2019–24): Olaf Schmidt

Area
  - Total: 11.13 km^{2} (4.30 sq mi)
- Elevation: 428 m (1,404 ft)

Population (2025-12-31)
  - Total: 507
  - Density: 45.6/km^{2} (118/sq mi)
- Time zone: UTC+01:00 (CET)
  - Summer (DST): UTC+02:00 (CEST)
- Postal codes: 55776
- Dialling codes: 06783
- Vehicle registration: BIR
- Website: www.reichenbach-nahe.de

Reichenbach (German pronunciation: [ˈʁaɪçn̩bax]) is an Ortsgemeinde – a municipality belonging to a Verbandsgemeinde, a kind of collective municipality – in the Birkenfeld district in Rhineland-Palatinate, Germany. It belongs to the Verbandsgemeinde of Baumholder, whose seat is in the like-named town.

== Geography ==
=== Location ===
The municipality lies on the like-named brook, the Reichenbach, west of the 563 m-high Feldberg. The municipal area is 37.5% wooded.

=== Neighbouring municipalities ===
Reichenbach borders in the north on the municipality of Frauenberg, in the east on the Baumholder military drilling ground, in the south on the municipality of Ruschberg and in the west on the municipalities of Nohen and Kronweiler.

=== Constituent communities ===
Also belonging to Reichenbach are the outlying homesteads of Gerichtmannsmühle, Reichenbacherhöfe and Sonnenhof.

== Politics ==
=== Municipal council ===
The council is made up of 12 council members, who were elected by majority vote at the municipal election held on 7 June 2009, and the honorary mayor as chairman.

=== Mayor ===
Reichenbach's mayor is Olaf Schmidt.

=== Coat of arms ===
The municipality's arms might be described thus: Per bend azure a bend sinister wavy between two millrinds palewise in bend, issuant from base a mount of three all argent, and chequy gules and argent.

The “chequy” field is a reference to the village's former allegiance to the County of Sponheim.

== Culture and sightseeing ==
=== Buildings ===
The following are listed buildings or sites in Rhineland-Palatinate’s Directory of Cultural Monuments:

- Evangelical parish church, Kirchstraße 11 – Gothic Revival quarrystone aisleless church, 1863/1864, Municipal Master Builder Maßweiler, Sankt Wendel
- Auf dem Schoß 11 – stately estate complex along the street, 1879
- Between Hauptstraße 44 and 49 – warriors’ memorial for the victims of the First World War; stelelike, sandstone block with relief, design by Professor Renker, Trier, execution by F. Ritter and successors, after 1918

== Economy and infrastructure ==
=== Transport ===
Running south of the village is the Autobahn A 62 (Kaiserslautern–Trier). Serving nearby Nohen is a railway station on the Nahe Valley Railway (Bingen–Saarbrücken).
