= Ellweiler =

- Municipality
- Coat of arms

- Location of Ellweiler within Birkenfeld district
- Interactive map of Ellweiler
- Location within Germany Location within Rhineland-Palatinate
- Coordinates: 49°36′54″N 7°08′40″E
- Country: Germany
- State: Rhineland-Palatinate
- District: Birkenfeld
- Municipal assoc.: Birkenfeld

Government
  - Mayor (2019–24): Christian Schöpfer

Area
  - Total: 7.46 km^{2} (2.88 sq mi)
- Elevation: 358 m (1,175 ft)

Population (2025-12-31)
  - Total: 337
  - Density: 45.2/km^{2} (117/sq mi)
- Time zone: UTC+01:00 (CET)
  - Summer (DST): UTC+02:00 (CEST)
- Postal codes: 55765
- Dialling codes: 06782
- Vehicle registration: BIR
- Website: www.ellweiler.de

Ellweiler is an Ortsgemeinde – a municipality belonging to a Verbandsgemeinde, a kind of collective municipality – in the Birkenfeld district in Rhineland-Palatinate, Germany. It belongs to the Verbandsgemeinde of Birkenfeld, whose seat is in the like-named town.

== Geography ==
=== Location ===
The municipality lies on the Traunbach in the Schwarzwälder Hochwald (forest) in the Hunsrück near the boundary with the Saarland. The municipal area is 67.6% wooded.

=== Neighbouring municipalities ===
Ellweiler borders in the north on the municipality of Dambach, in the east on the municipality of Hoppstädten-Weiersbach (Ortsteil of Neubrücke) and in the south on the municipality of Nohfelden in the Saarland.

=== Constituent communities ===
Also belonging to Ellweiler are the outlying homesteads of Haumbach, Neubrücker Mühle and Steinautal.

== History ==
In the 12th century, Ellweiler had its first documentary mention. After first being an Electoral-Trier fief, it passed in 1480 to the Duchy of Palatinate-Zweibrücken.

== Politics ==
=== Municipal council ===
The council is made up of 8 council members, who were elected by majority vote at the municipal election held on 7 June 2009, and the honorary mayor as chairman.

=== Mayor ===
Ellweiler's mayor is Christian Schöpfer.

=== Coat of arms ===
The German blazon reads: In geteiltem Schild oben eine rote Elchschaufel in Gold, unten ein rotbewehrter, -gezungter und -gekrönter wachsender goldener Löwe in Schwarz.

The municipality's arms might in English heraldic language be described thus: Per fess Or an elk's attire fesswise gules and sable issuant from base a demilion of the first armed, langued and crowned of the second.

The elk's attire (that is, antler) is a canting charge for the German word Elch, meaning “(Eurasian) elk” (that is to say, “moose”), which is taken to be the source of the first syllable in the village's name (the Weiler part means “hamlet”, but there is no canting charge for that). The lion is drawn from the arms formerly borne by the Duchy of Palatinate-Zweibrücken.

The arms have been borne since 1963.

== Culture and sightseeing ==
=== Buildings ===
The following are listed buildings or sites in Rhineland-Palatinate’s Directory of Cultural Monuments:

- Evangelical church, Bohnenhübel 2 – aisleless church with ridge turret, 1776, architect Philipp Heinrich Hellermann, Zweibrücken; characterizes village’s appearance

== Economy and infrastructure ==
=== Transport ===
To the southeast run Bundesstraße 41 and the Autobahn A 62 (Kaiserslautern–Trier). Serving nearby Neubrücke is a railway station on the Nahe Valley Railway (Bingen–Saarbrücken).

=== Uranium ===
From 1958 to 1967, uranium ore was mined by the Gewerkschaft Brunhilde (a limited company) in an open pit north of Ellweiler on the “Bühlskopf” (49°37′04″N 07°08′49″E – position of abandoned Ellweiler uranium open-pit mine). Smaller uranium deposits were also found 650 m northwest of the Bühlskopf on the northeast slope of “Der Stein” as well as in a couple of places near Nohfelden. Processing was done at the Uranerzaufbereitungsanlage Ellweiler (Ellweiler Uranium Ore Processing Facility).
