= Birkenfeld =

- Town
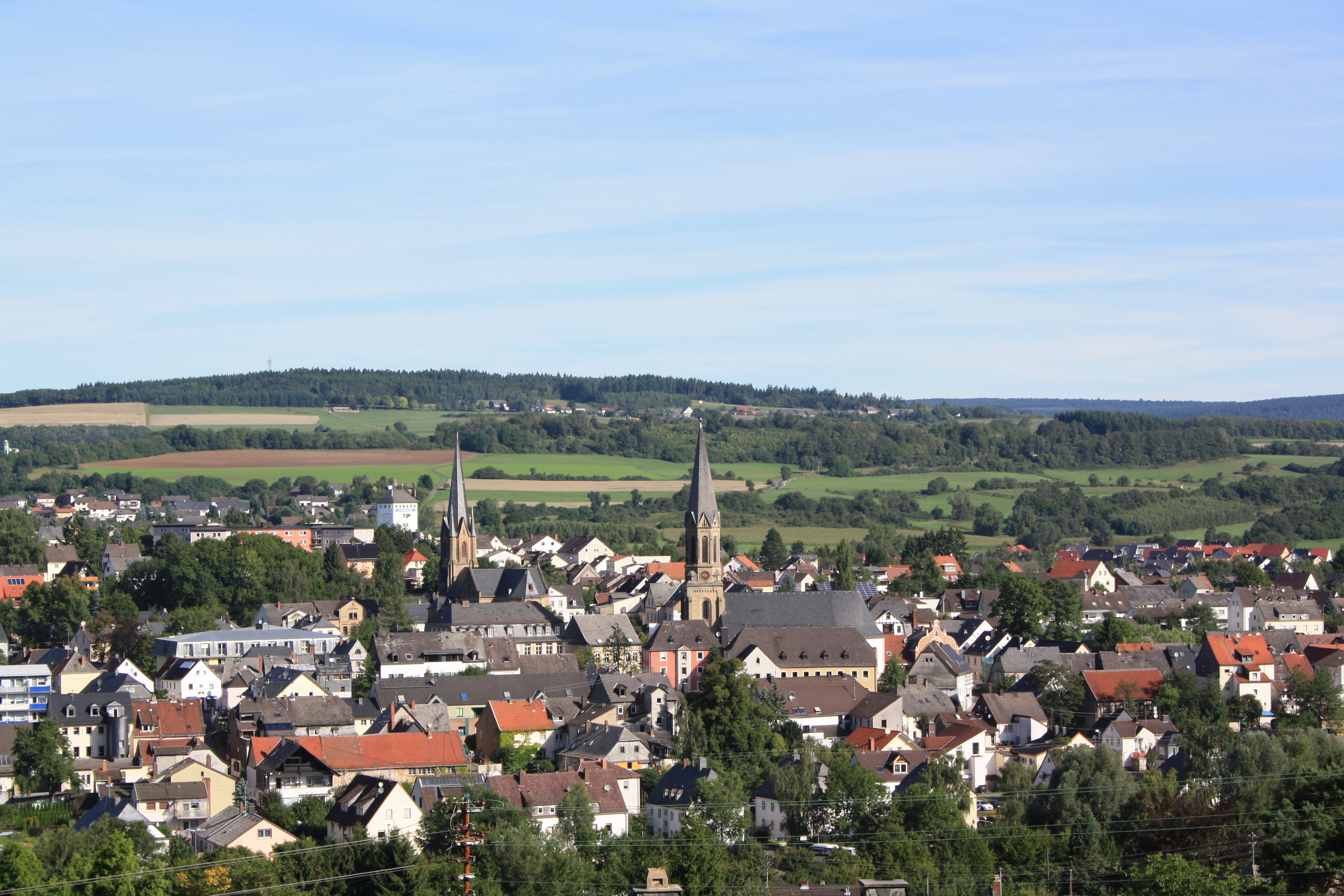
- View of the town from the Burgberg

- Coat of arms

- Location of Birkenfeld within Birkenfeld district
- Interactive map of Birkenfeld
- Location within Germany Location within Rhineland-Palatinate
- Coordinates: 49°39′N 7°11′E
- Country: Germany
- State: Rhineland-Palatinate
- District: Birkenfeld
- Municipal assoc.: Birkenfeld

Government
  - Mayor (2019–24): Miroslaw Kowalski (CDU)

Area
  - Total: 13.64 km^{2} (5.27 sq mi)
- Elevation: 410 m (1,350 ft)

Population (2025-12-31)
  - Total: 7,042
  - Density: 516.3/km^{2} (1,337/sq mi)
- Time zone: UTC+01:00 (CET)
  - Summer (DST): UTC+02:00 (CEST)
- Postal codes: 55765
- Dialling codes: 06782
- Vehicle registration: BIR
- Website: www.stadt-birkenfeld.de

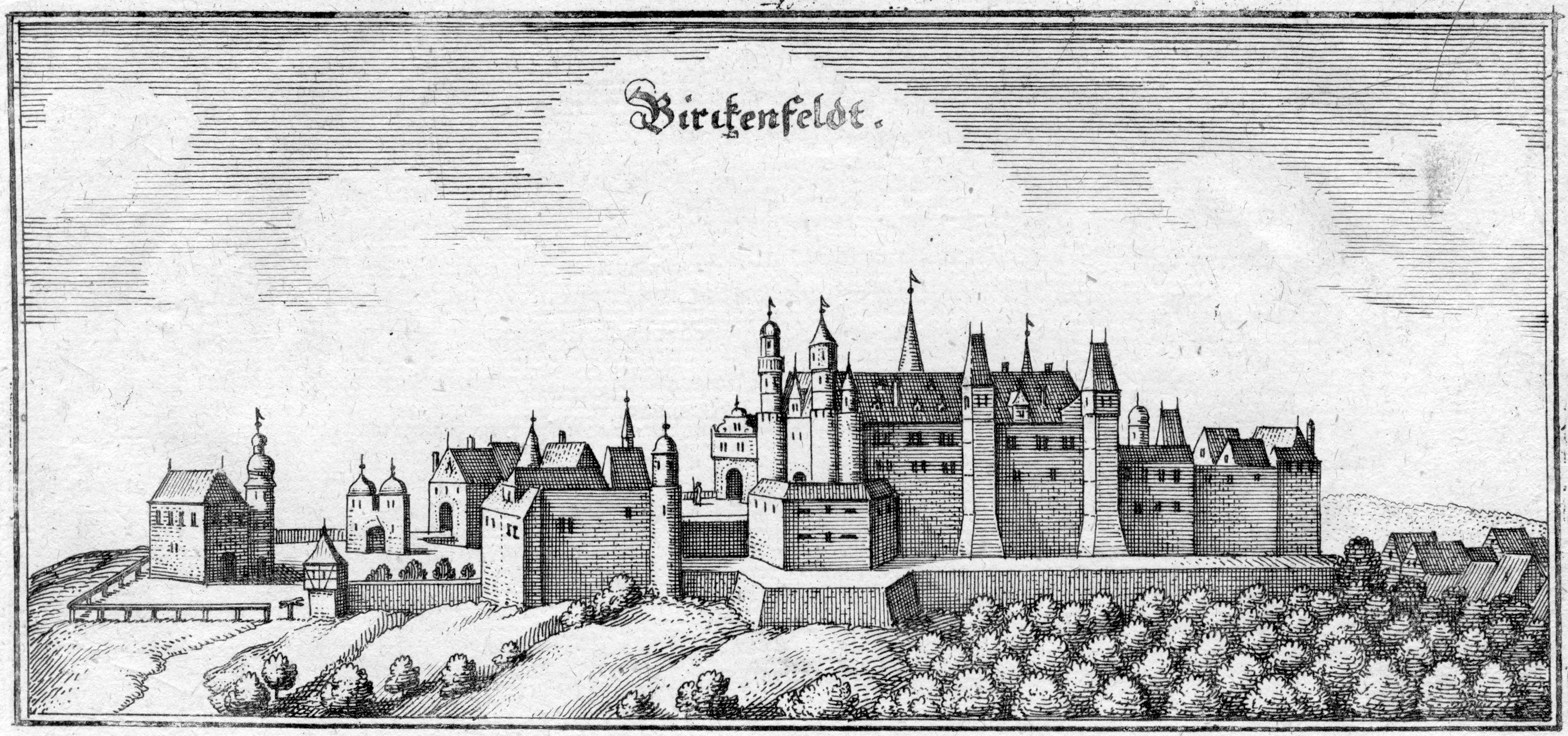
Schloss Birkenfeld, now a castle ruin (Matthäus Merian 17th century)

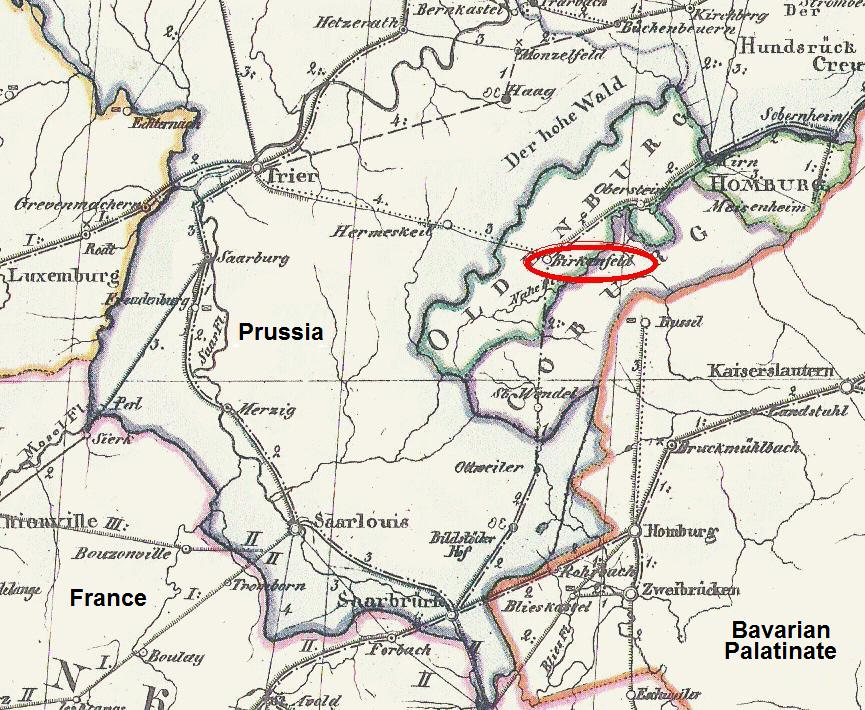
Birkenfeld in Oldenburg times, 1829

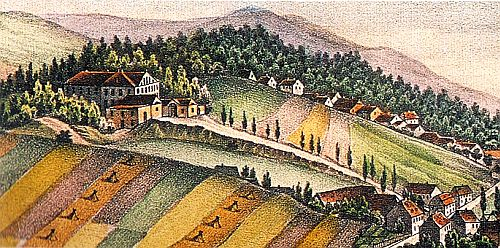
The "new" (Oldenburg) Schloss

Birkenfeld (German pronunciation: [ˈbɪʁkn̩fɛlt]) is a town and the district seat of the Birkenfeld district in southwest Rhineland-Palatinate, Germany. It is also the seat of the like-named Verbandsgemeinde. The town itself has approximately 7,000 inhabitants.

== Geography ==
=== Location ===
The town lies in the Nahegebiet (Nahe area), to the north of the namesake river, on the edge of the Naturpark Saar-Hunsrück. Birkenfeld lies roughly 13 km southwest of Idar-Oberstein and 12 km northwest of Baumholder.

=== Neighbouring municipalities ===
Clockwise from the north, these are Gollenberg, Elchweiler, Schmißberg, Rimsberg, Dienstweiler, Ellweiler, Dambach, Brücken, Buhlenberg and Ellenberg.

== History ==
The name Birkenfeld has its origin in an old German dialect, Old Frankish. It means something rather like "at the field with the birches" (it is directly cognate with the English words "birch field"). From the name's Frankish roots it can be inferred that today's town arose on a spot where there was quite a noticeable stand of birch trees sometime about the year AD 500, and that it was founded by Frankish-German farmers. To this day, there are a great number of birch trees in the bird conservation area at the clay quarries.

The first attestation of the name is spelled Bikenuelt (about 700) or Birkinvelt at the time when it had a documentary mention from Archbishop of Trier Egbert in 981. From this document comes knowledge that Saint Leudwinus (Archbishop of Trier 695-713) had donated to the St. Paulinus' Abbey in Trier the churches at Birkenfeld and Brombach.

Archaeological finds from the Iron Age, however, bear witness to quite heavy settlement even in the 8th century BC. In the 1st century BC, Roman legions overran the area, and for 400 years, it lay under Roman rule. This is known mainly from finds made in the town's immediate vicinity. The town that is now Birkenfeld lies right on a Roman road that served as a crosslink between two important military roads, namely the Metz-Mainz road to the south and the Trier-Bingen-Mainz road to the north, which was mentioned by Roman poet Ausonius in his Mosella in AD 350, and which also corresponds along some stretches with the Hunsrückhöhenstraße ("Hunsrück Heights Road", a scenic road across the Hunsrück built originally as a military road on Hermann Göring's orders). This crosslink, also known as the Bronzestraße ("Bronze Road"), linked the Glan, Nohen and the Moselle with each other. The Bronzestraße crossed the Nahe in Nohen (villa Aldena) and ran farther on, right through the Wasserschieder Wald, a state forest that still stands today on the town's outskirts, by way of Gollenberg, by Börfink and on towards Trier.

The Frankish settlement of Birkinvelt was held in the 13th century by the Counts of Sponheim. In 1223, the county was split into the "Front" and "Rear" Counties of Sponheim, and Birkenfeld passed to the latter, and was then held by the counts whose seat was at the Starkenburg (castle, now a ruin) near Trarbach. In 1293, Castle Birkenfeld had its first documentary mention. In 1332, Birkenfeld was granted town rights by Emperor Louis the Bavarian.

After the last Count of Sponheim died in 1437, the "Rear" County was inherited by the Margraves of Baden and the Counts of Veldenz. In 1584, a House of Wittelsbach sideline, in the person of Charles I, Count Palatine of Zweibrücken-Birkenfeld, resided in town. In this same year, expansion work also began on the castle to turn it into a princely residence in the Renaissance style. Exactly 140 years later, the last remnants of the Princely holding of court at Schloss Birkenfeld, as it had come to be known, were swept away. During the Thirty Years' War (1618–1648), the town itself became in 1635 a theatre of war. Also that year, the Plague broke out in Birkenfeld and claimed 416 lives.

In 1776, under Margrave Karl Friedrich, Birkenfeld became seat of the Badish Oberamt. In this time, Birkenfeld blossomed. The town experienced an economic and cultural upswing. In 1779, for instance, the first "Higher School" was founded.

One night in February 1797, Johannes Bückler, known as Schinderhannes, burgled a cloth factory owned by the Brothers Stumm, who would later become coal and steel entrepreneurs on the Saar. A large part of the cloth stolen during this break-in Schinderhannes sold to a fence in Hundheim.

In 1798, during the French Revolutionary Wars, the Left Bank of the Rhine was ceded to France, whereafter Birkenfeld belonged to the Department of Sarre.

After the Congress of Vienna (1814-1815) which ended the Napoleonic Wars, most of the Left Bank became part of Prussian Grand Duchy of the Lower Rhine (Rhine Province after 1822), the Bavarian Circle of the Rhine or the Hessian Rhenish Hesse. However, a small area between the Prussian and Bavarian parts was given as exclaves to three other states: the Principality of Lichtenberg went to Saxe-Coburg-Saalfeld (Saxe-Coburg and Gotha after 1826), Meisenheim went to Hesse-Hanau and the Principality of Birkenfeld was awarded to the Grand Duchy of Oldenburg for the contribution of Peter I, then regent of Oldenburg, to the military effort against Napoleon. By 1866 Birknefeld had become entirely enclaved within the Prussian Rhine Province, as Lichtenberg had been sold to Prussia in 1834 and Meisenheim had been annexed following the Austro-Prussian War.

Under Oldenburg rule, the new palatial castle, which is now the district administration's seat, was built in 1821. Not only was this built, but so were further buildings in the Governmental Quarter (Regierungsviertel), such as the infantry barracks (until 1963, a Gymnasium building, now the local office for the regulation of expenditures caused by stationed forces), which to this day characterize the town's appearance with their Classicist style from Oldenburg times.

On 1 April 1937, during the Nazi period, the Birkenfeld region was transferred to the Prussian Rhine Province; it was merged with the Restkreis (roughly "remnant district") of St. Wendel-Baumholder to form the Birkenfeld District. (The Kreis of St. Wendel-Baumholder was what had been the Principality of Lichtenberg until 1834, with the designation as a Restkreis having arisen after part of its territory, including St. Wendel itself, had been detached to form part of the Territory of the Saar Basin established under the terms of the Treaty of Versailles). After the Second World War, Birkenfeld belonged to the French Occupation Zone, and since 1946, it has been a district seat in Rhineland-Palatinate.

== Religion ==
In 2008, 50% of the town's inhabitants were Evangelical and 31% were Catholic. Besides these two biggest groups, there are an Evangelical Free Church congregation (Baptists), the Mennonite Brethren Church, a New Apostolic church and the Jehovah's Witnesses.

== Politics ==
Birkenfeld has been a district seat since 1947 and forms together with 30 other municipalities a Verbandsgemeinde, a kind of collective municipality, called the Verbandsgemeinde of Birkenfeld.

=== Town council ===
The council is made up of 22 council members, who were elected by proportional representation at the municipal election held on 25 May 2014, and the honorary mayor as chairman.

The municipal election held on 25 May 2014 yielded the following results:

Year	SPD	CDU	BfB	BFL	FDP	Total
2014	9	9	1	2	1	22 seats
2009	8	8	3	2	1	22 seats
2004	8	11	-	2	1	22 seats

BFL is Birkenfelder Freie Liste (“Birkenfeld Free List”). BfB is Bürger für Birkenfeld (“Citizens for Birkenfeld”).

=== Mayors ===
Birkenfeld's mayor is Miroslaw Kowalski (CDU), re-elected in 2019. His predecessor was Peter Nauert (CDU). Peter Nauert was the first mayor ever to be elected by direct vote by the people of Birkenfeld. Both his predecessors, Manfred Dreier and Erich Mörsdorf, headed both the town and the Verbandsgemeinde of Birkenfeld at once.

Werner Käufer was the last professional mayor of the town of Birkenfeld. Indeed, he was acclaimed in the office in 1968 with a great majority for another 12 years, but by 1970, he had to give up his professional office when, under administrative restructuring in Rhineland-Palatinate, towns with fewer than 7,500 inhabitants were merged into Verbandsgemeinden.

The following have served as mayor of Birkenfeld:

- Eugen Ruppenthal from 1923 to 1933 and from 1949 to 1953
- Oswald Morenz from 1953 to 1961
- Werner Käufer from 1961 to 1970
- Erich Mörsdorf from 1971 to 1990
- Manfred Dreier from 1990 to 2000, (SPD)
- Peter Nauert from 2000 until 2014 (CDU)
- Miroslaw Kowalski since 2014, (CDU)

=== Coat of arms ===
The town's arms might be described thus: Azure on a mount vert a birch tree with roots proper surmounted by an inescutcheon chequy gules and argent.

The main charge, the birch tree, is canting for the town's name (“birch” is Birke in German). The inescutcheon with the red and silver “chequy” pattern is the coat of arms formerly borne by the “Hinder” County of Sponheim, thus bearing witness to that time in the town's history. This composition is based on an old court seal from 1577.

The arms have been borne since 29 October 1923, when they were approved by the Ministry of the Interior at Oldenburg.

=== Town partnerships ===
Birkenfeld fosters partnerships with the following places:

- Roerdalen, Limburg, Netherlands
- Château-Salins, Moselle, France

== Culture and sightseeing ==
=== Lambdacism in the local dialect ===
In bygone days, the local Birkenfeld dialect was marked by the peculiarity of often replacing the sounds /d/ and /t/ – and sometimes /r/ as well – with /l/, a shift known as lambdacism. For example, a Birkenfelder in those days would have said Fulerlale where Standard High German would have Futterladen (“fodder shop”). A full-sentence example can be seen in a remark made by the Birkenfeld sexton “Fuchs Karl” to the church councillor and parish priest Haag: Jo, jo, Herr Kirjerot, pririje kann e jela, awa noch lang net loule!, or in Standard High German, Ja, ja, Herr Kirchenrat, predigen kann ein jeder, aber noch lange nicht läuten! (“Yes, yes, Mr. Church Councillor, preaching is something anyone can do, but bellringing, not for long”).

Lambdacism, though, long ago vanished from the Birkenfeld dialect, having given way to the other shift that is customary in Hunsrückisch: rhotacism.

=== Museums ===
The Landesmuseum des Vereins für Heimatkunde im Landkreis Birkenfeld (“State Museum of the Association for Local History in the Rural District of Birkenfeld”) offers an overview of 2,500 years of cultural history. The centrepiece is the interactively equipped Celtic experience exhibit Kelten, Kunst und Kult erleben (“Experience Celts, Art and Worship”). Here, through reconstructions, archaeological finds and replicas, these people's life is presented. Further exhibits deal with regional and territorial history of the Birkenfelder Land. Historical highlights among these exhibits are the High Middle Ages (13th to 15th centuries) and Oldenburg times in the Principality of Birkenfeld beginning in the early 19th century. Regularly changing exhibits deal with both historical and current themes.

=== Buildings ===
The following are listed buildings or sites in Rhineland-Palatinate’s Directory of Cultural Monuments:

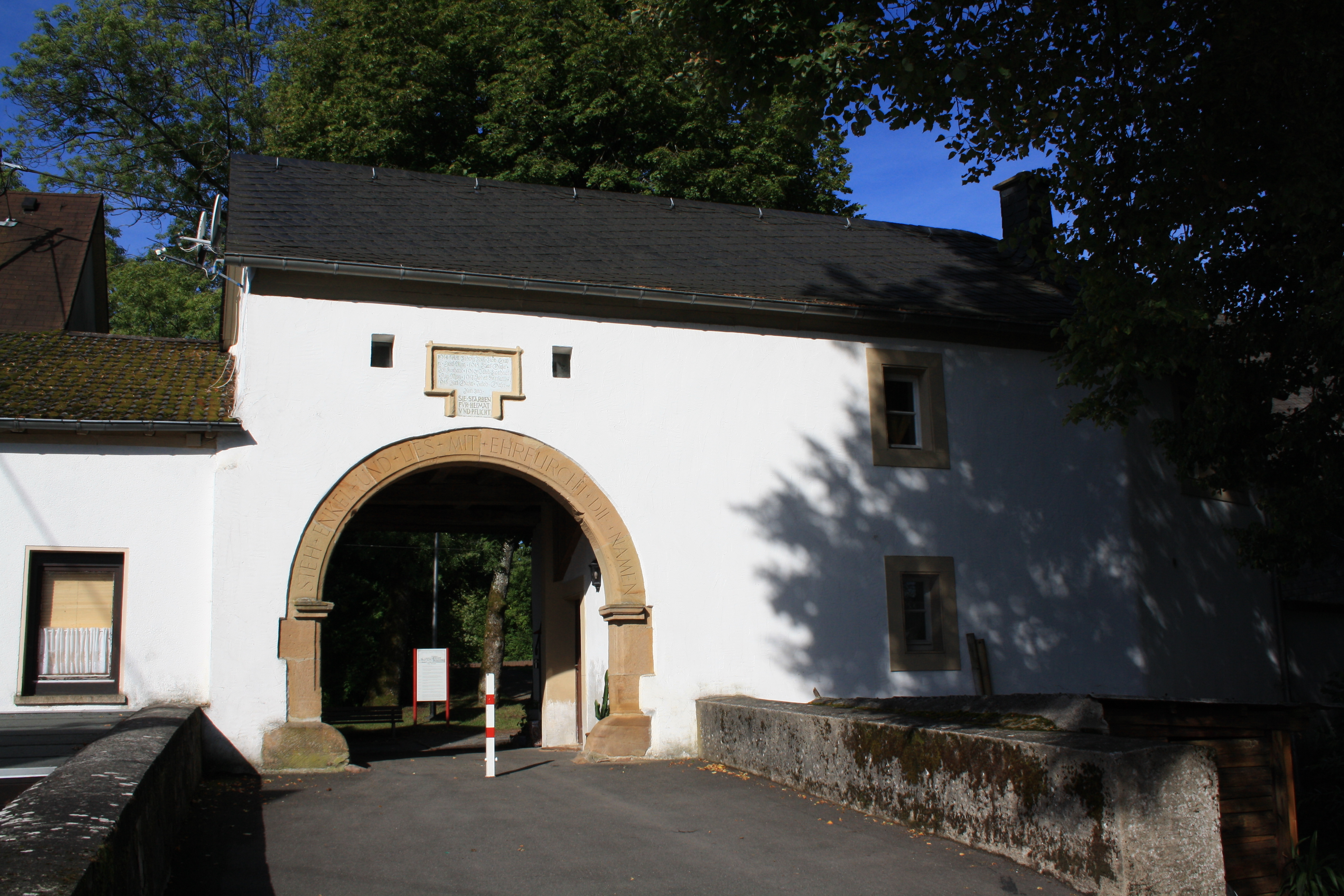
Castle Birkenfeld’s gatehouse

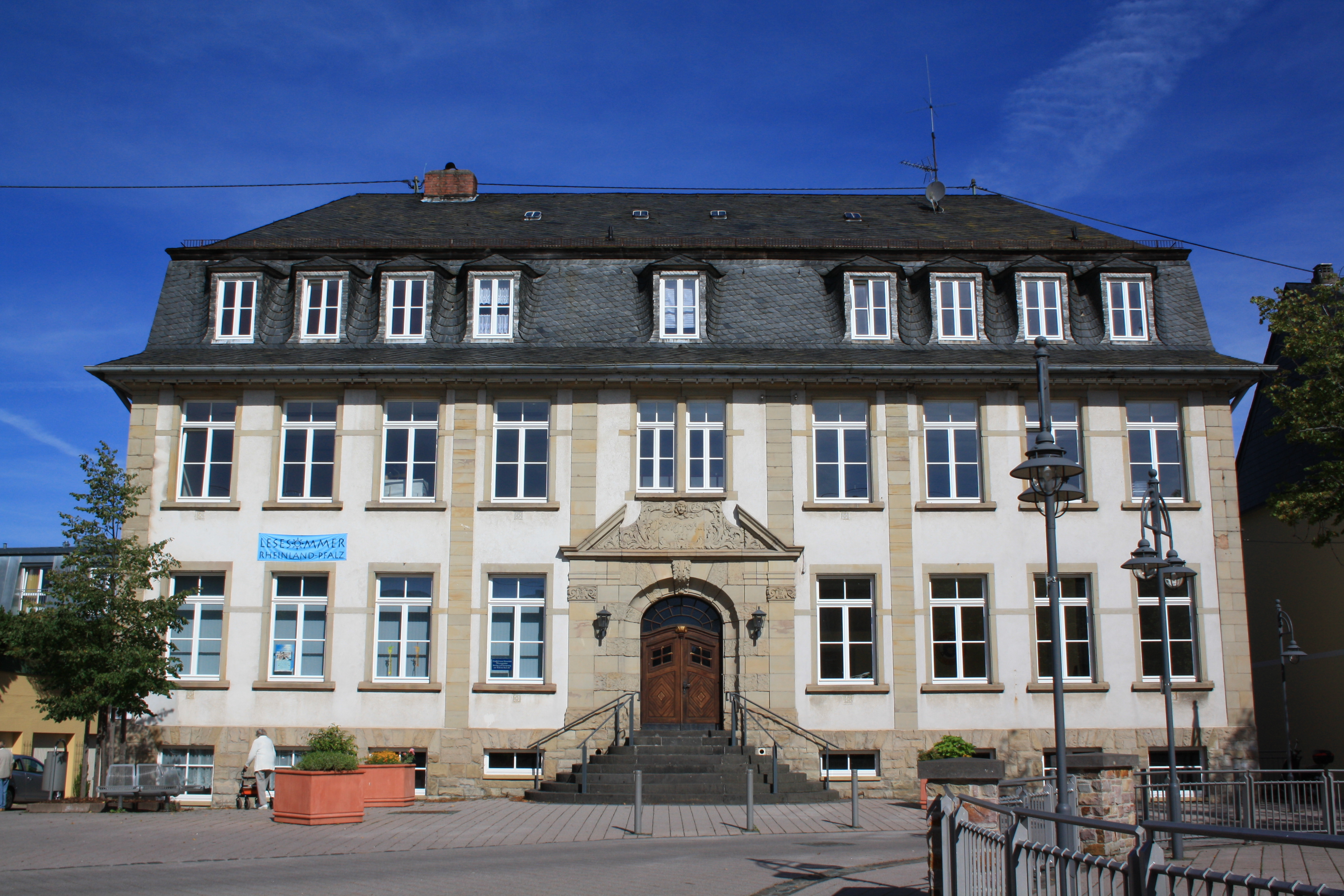
The Old School on Kirchplatz

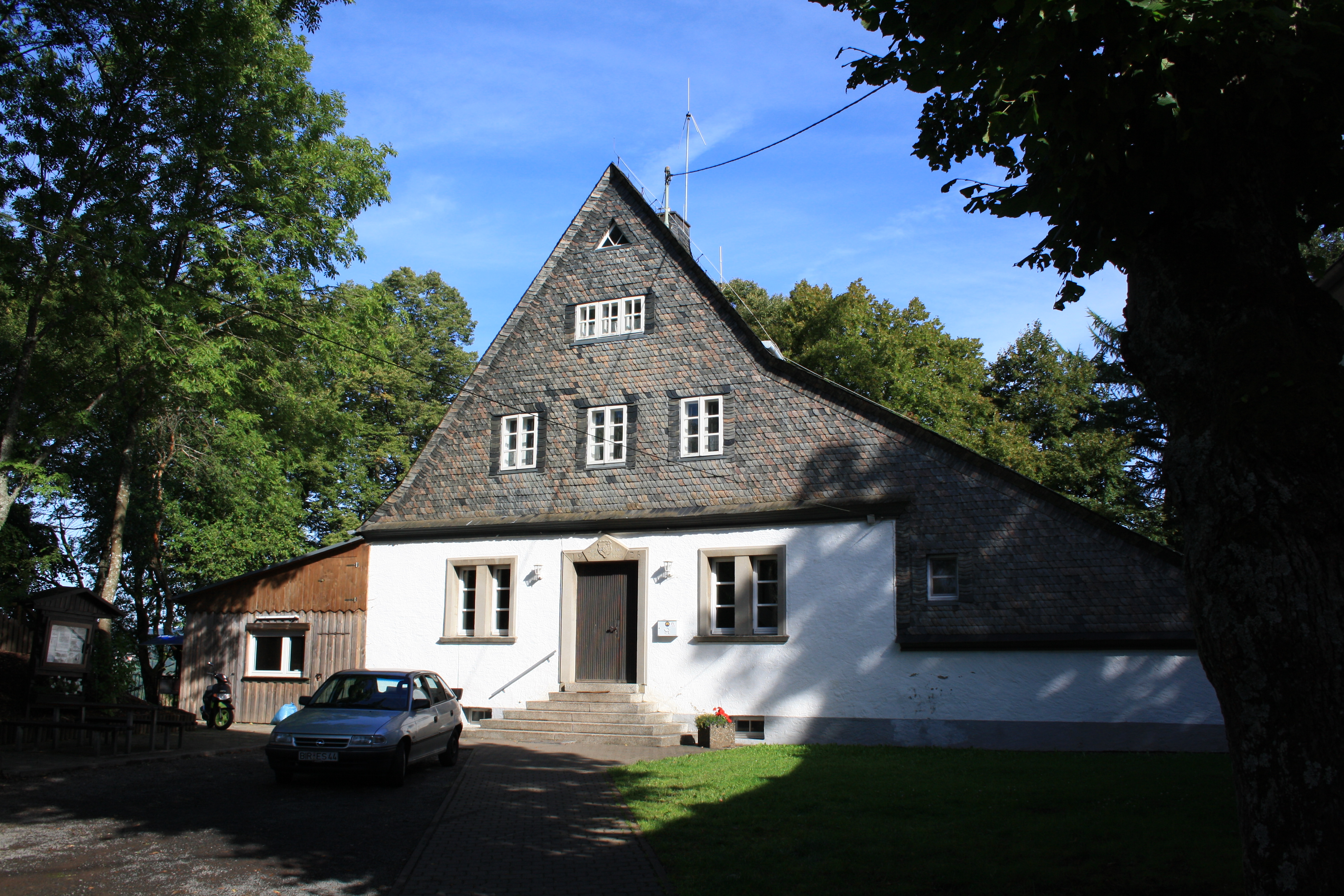
The former youth hostel; the building was built on the castle grounds on foundations that formerly supported a rectory

- Castle Birkenfeld, Burgstraße 17, 19, 28, 30, 32 (monumental zone) – preserved from the actual mediaeval castle a round tower stump; from the Renaissance complex the gatehouse (no. 17); former Gasthaus zum ledigen Waidsack (inn, no. 28); youth hostel, 1926, architect Wilhelm Heilig, Darmstadt (no. 19)
- Evangelical parish church, Am Kirchplatz 4/6 – Baroque aisleless church, five-sided quire, 1750-1756, architects Jonas Erikson Sundahl and Johann Seiz; Romanesque Revival west tower, 1895/1896, architect Heinrich Jester, Speyer; bells from 1554, 1717, 1961; décor
- Saint James’s Catholic Parish Church (Pfarrkirche St. Jacobus), Maiwiese 8 – Gothic Revival hall church, yellow sandstone, 1888-1890, architect Reinhold Wirtz, Trier; tomb slab 1752; décor
- Am Kirchplatz 2 – dwelling and commercial house, partly timber-frame, marked 1808, essentially older
- Am Kirchplatz 5 – Evangelical and Catholic public school; nine-axis Baroque Revival building with mansard roof, 1911; characterizes square’s appearance
- Am Kirchplatz 11 – dwelling and (former) commercial house; Renaissance Revival, 1881, characterizes square’s appearance
- Am Rech 2 – so-called Backhaus (“Bakehouse”); small house, partly timber-frame, partly slated, 18th or early 19th century
- An der Oelmühle 4 – former mill; quarrystone building, 1580; oilmill beginning in the 1770s, expansion and higher roof 1922; technical equipment
- Auf dem Römer 5 – building with half-hipped roof, partly timber-frame (with wooden shingles), marked 1723
- Auf dem Römer 6 – Baroque house, 18th century, essentially possibly older (1665?); characterizes street's and town's appearance
- Auf dem Römer 9 – so-called Kußlersches Haus; corner house, marked 1590, partly with alterations from the 19th century; characterizes town's appearance
- Bahnhofstraße 2 – Late Historicist house, hewn-stone plastered surfaces, bare timber framing, late 19th century
- Bahnhofstraße 4 – corner house, partly timber-frame (slated), wooden gallery, late 18th or early 19th century; characterizes street's appearance
- Brückener Straße 8 – house with saddle hipped roof, gabled dormer, 1920s/1930s
- Friedrich-August-Straße 15 – Maler-Hugo-Zang-Haus; Neoclassical house, 1883 (see below)
- Friedrich-August-Straße 17 – museum; in the forms of a Roman country house, 1910, architect Julius Groeschel, Munich
- Across from Gollenberger Weg 3 – cast-iron fountain, late 19th century
- Hauptstraße 9 – so-called Stadthaus (“Town House”); lavish Historicist corner building on a terrace, about 1900
- Before Hauptstraße 11 – so-called Apothekerbrunnen (“Apothecary’s Fountain”); great cast-iron Gothic Revival complex, last fourth of the 19th century
- Königsgasse 11 – dwarf house with barn under one roof, stable built on later and roof made higher
- Pfarrgasse 1 – Evangelical rectory; solid bungalow, biaxial dormer, 1733
- Between Rennweg 27 and 29 – warriors’ memorial for students from the Gymnasium Betuletia who fell in the First World War; cube upon a pedestal, steel-helmet relief, 1927, design by Wilhelm Heilig, Darmstadt
- Across from Rennweg 30 – so-called Steinernes Kreuz (“Stone Cross”); Bildstock, tuff, 16th century, possibly Pre-Reformation
- Saarstraße 19 – stately Quereinhaus (a combination residential and commercial house divided for these two purposes down the middle, perpendicularly to the street), latter half of the 19th century
- Schadtengasse 2 – house with three-part window ensemble, marked 1838
- Schlossallee 3 – five-axis wood-shingled house, 19th century; at the south gable parts of a nursery's sunken conservatory
- Schlossallee 11 and 13 – Neues Schloss; Classicist group around open cour d'honneur, 1819–1821, architect J. W. L. Brofft, Frankfurt; main building with triaxial middle risalto, round behind, a balcony-porch; décor; one-floor side building with gabled entrance facility
- Schlossallee 2, 3, 5, 9, 7, 11, 15, Schneewiesenstraße 22, 25, Friedrich-August-Straße 17, Regierungsviertel (“Governmental Quarter”; monumental zone) – in Oldenburg times, beginning in the early 19th century successively built buildings in the angle formed by Schneewiesenstraße and Friedrich-August-Straße including palatial castle (Schloss), barracks, prison, Government Building II, forester's office, museum and Gymnasium headmaster's house
- Schneewiesenstraße 3 – so-called Pirmannsches Haus; elegant Classicist building, three-floor gabled risalto, 1859
- Schneewiesenstraße 22 – former infantry barracks; so-called Altes Gymnasium, nine-axis Classicist plastered building, 1842/1843
- Schneewiesenstraße 25 – third Oldenburg public authority building; Baroque Revival building with mansard roof, three-floor gabled risalto, 1912
- Wasserschiederstraße 1 – corner house, partly slated, round behind, a sided gallery, hipped mansard roof, 1767, shop built in about 1900; characterizes town's appearance
- Wasserschiederstraße 2/4 – double house on a high base, entrance gateway, marked 1791
- Wasserschiederstraße 6 – former inn with brewery; sandstone quarrystone building, marked 1897
- Wasserschiederstraße 7 – house, partly timber-frame (plastered), possibly from the early 19th century
- Wasserschiederstraße 16 – great house with stable facilities, mid 19th century
- Behind Wasserschiederstraße 47 – dovecote; small wooden building, cross-shaped roof with lantern, latter half of the 19th century
- Wasserschiederstraße 49 – building with hipped roof, country house style, about 1910, roofed gallery to side building in the garden
- Graveyard, Brückener Straße (monumental zone) – laid out in 1810; Gothic Revival chapel, about 1850; grave cross 1769, on pedestal about 1900; memorial to the fallen 1870/1871; two elegant family graves (Eduard and Richard Böcking's families); family Scherer's tomb, 1920s
- Jewish graveyard, southeast of the town, on the road to Dambach (monumental zone) – 34 grave steles in situ, from 1898 and later

=== Maler-Zang-Haus ===
Right next to the Birkenfeld State Museum is the Maler-Zang-Haus (“Painter Zang House”). The house, built in 1883 in the bourgeois Classicist style, is where the painter Hugo Zang (1858–1946) once lived. In 2006, restoration work began in an effort to bring the house up to a standard worthy of monumental protection. Since 2008, the building has housed not only the Birkenfeld district folk high school but also seven gallery rooms for changing exhibitions of works by local and national artists.

== Economy and infrastructure ==
=== Economy ===
The town's economy is characterized mainly by small and midsize businesses. Owing to Birkenfeld's history as a noble residence town and an administrative seat, no great industrial development ever took place here. The biggest employers, besides the administrative bodies, are thus a foundation and the Bundeswehr.

The German Red Cross’s (DRK) Elisabeth-Stiftung, a medical rehabilitation foundation, with its hospital, Berufsförderungswerk Birkenfeld (an institute for retraining workers whose condition precludes their return to former occupations), private vocational schools, measures for youth and senior citizens’ home is with more than 600 employees the town's biggest employer. Following the Elisabeth-Stiftung is the Bundeswehr (among other units, the 2nd Luftwaffe Division) with more than 500 military and civilian personnel. The Stefan-Morsch-Stiftung, a foundation for keeping data on potential bone marrow and stem cell donors, has its seat in Birkenfeld.

On the lands of the former railway station, a centre for starting up businesses (“BIG-Center”) was built in the 1990s.

=== Transport ===
==== Road ====
Birkenfeld has good road links to Bundesstraßen 41 (east-west, between Mainz and Saarbrücken) and 269 (between Bernkastel-Kues and Saarlouis), as well as to Autobahn A 62, which is the most important north–south link, running between Trier and Kaiserslautern. Furthermore, Bundesstraße 269 links to the Hunsrückhöhenstraße, and thereby to Frankfurt-Hahn Airport, which lies 50 km away by road. This journey is covered five times each day by a bus service.

==== Rail ====
Birkenfeld's rail link is 5 km away in nearby Neubrücke, which has a station on the Nahe Valley Railway (Bingen–Saarbrücken). Saarbrücken can be reached by train in 45 minutes, and Frankfurt in less than two hours. The former spur line leading to Birkenfeld has been abandoned, and is now a cycle path.

==== Hiking trails ====
Running outwards from Birkenfeld are five local loop trails for hiking with a total length through the region of more than 60 km. These are the Glockenweg (roughly 16 km), the Eulenweg (roughly 9 km), the Mausweg (roughly 12.5 km), the Mühlenweg (roughly 12.5 km) and the Rehweg (roughly 12.5 km). The long-distance Nahe-Höhenweg and the Sironaweg, which leads by many Celtic-Roman archaeological finds, likewise run by Birkenfeld.

==== Cycle paths ====
The roughly 120 km-long Nahe-Radweg and the Rheinland-Pfalz-Route run right through the middle of town. They are supplemented by three local cycling circuits, R1, R2 and R3, with a total length of just under 80 km.

=== Public institutions ===
==== Education ====
Since 1996, a vocational school has been established on the grounds of a former US military hospital in the neighbouring municipality of Hoppstädten-Weiersbach. The Environmental Campus Birkenfeld (Umwelt-Campus Birkenfeld) has, as a branch of the Trier University of Applied Sciences, made a significant contribution to the Birkenfeld region's economic development.

For school-age children there is a broad array of offerings.

- Primary school
- Realschule plus
- Gymnasium Birkenfeld
- Förderschule Schwerpunkt Lernen (special school with focus on learning)
- The Elisabeth-Stiftung medical rehabilitation foundation. (Internationally renowned institution. Offers of qualifications to people with either physical or mental handicaps. Alumni come from all over Germany and even from neighbouring countries.)

Among other academic offerings is the Volkshochschule Birkenfeld, a folk high school.

==== Authorities ====
Birkenfeld is the location of a number of authorities:

- District administration
- Verbandsgemeinde administration
- Bundesagentur für Arbeit (Federal employment agency)
- Land surveying office
- Police department
- Forester's office

=== Sport and leisure ===
Birkenfeld has, among other sport and leisure facilities, a heated outdoor swimming pool, the Stadion am Berg (“Stadium at the Mountain”), several sport halls, a zoo, two libraries, a vocational library and the youth centre. In 2000, a skatepark was built at the youth centre, which in 2005 was expanded with a funbox, a quarter pipe, a ramp and an obstacle.

== Notable residents ==
=== Sons and daughters of the town ===
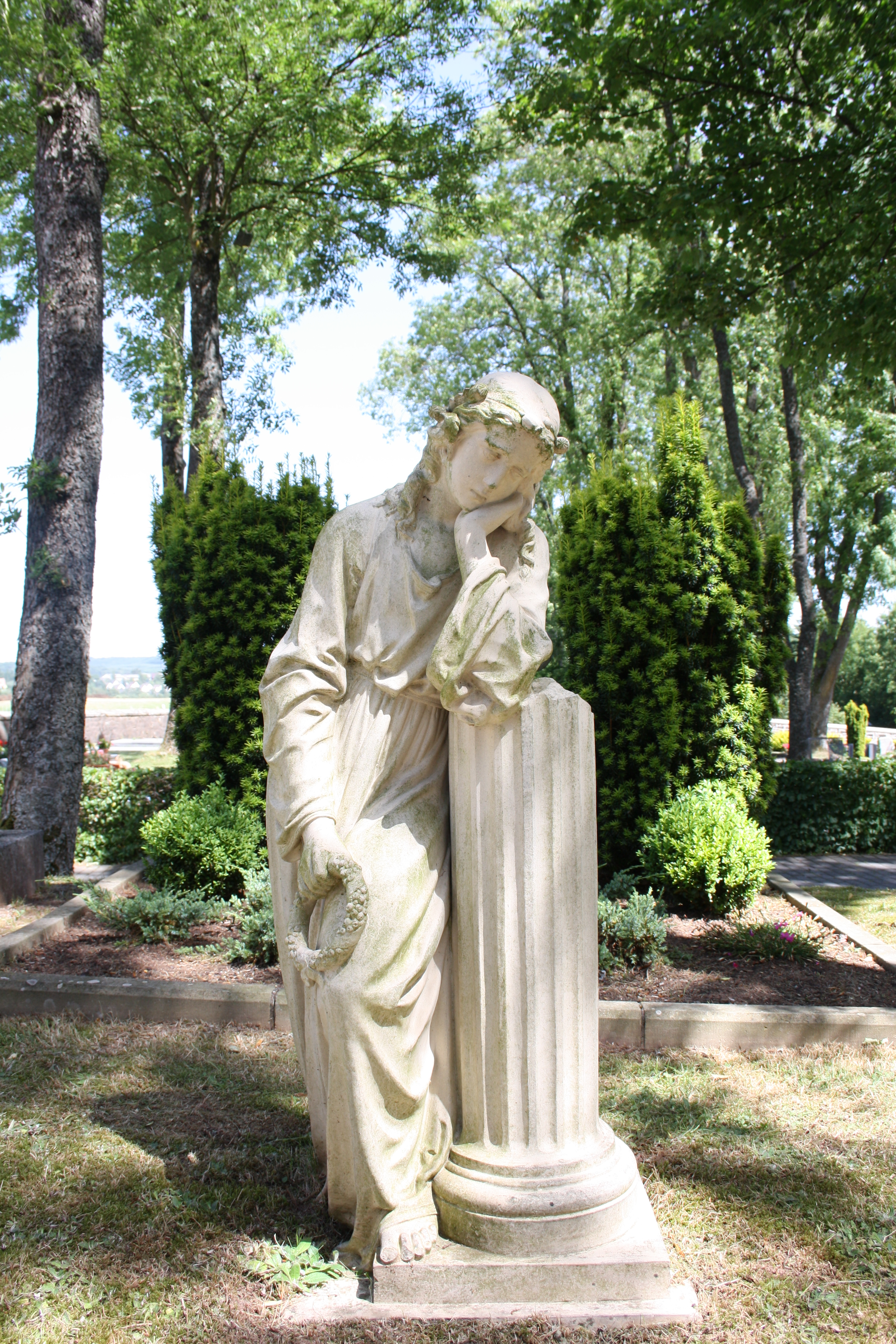
The Trauernde at the Birkenfeld graveyard. The figure's design originates from Christian Warth.

- Heiner Flassbeck (1950–), German economist, State Secretary (ret.), UNCTAD senior economist
- Matthias Henn (1985–), German footballer
- Lorielle London (1983–), entertainer, became well known from participation in the television programmes Deutschland sucht den Superstar and Ich bin ein Star – Holt mich hier raus!, the latter a German version of the British programme I'm a Celebrity...Get Me Out of Here!
- Otto Pick (1882–1945), German Democratic Party Member of the Reichstag (Nazi Germany)
- August Rippel-Baldes (1888–1970), founder of microbiology
- Eugenia von Skene (1906–?), Kapo at Ravensbrück concentration camp
- Christian Warth (1836–1890), modeller and draughtsman, known for the figure “Trauernde” (“Mourning Woman”) made by Villeroy & Boch on a make-to-stock basis, which can be found in many graveyards

=== Notable people associated with the town ===
- Ludwig Friedrich Schmidt (1764–1857), clergyman in Birkenfeld, later cabinet preacher to Queen Caroline of Bavaria and the first Evangelical clergyman in Munich, said to be the father of the Evangelical Lutheran Church in Bavaria.

Many well known people went to school in Birkenfeld:

- Friedrich Cassebohm (1872–1951), jurist and politician, among other things Minister-President of the Free State of Oldenburg
- Reinhard Goering (1887–1936), writer, Kleist Prize (1930)
- John Henry Mackay (1864–1933), Scottish-German writer
- Gerhard Storm (1888–1942) died at Dachau, martyr in the Catholic Church
- Klaus Rüter (b. 1940 in Berlin), German jurist, administrative official and politician (SPD).
- Nicole (1964–), singer and winner at the Eurovision Song Contest with “Ein bißchen Frieden”
