= Rimsberg =

- Municipality
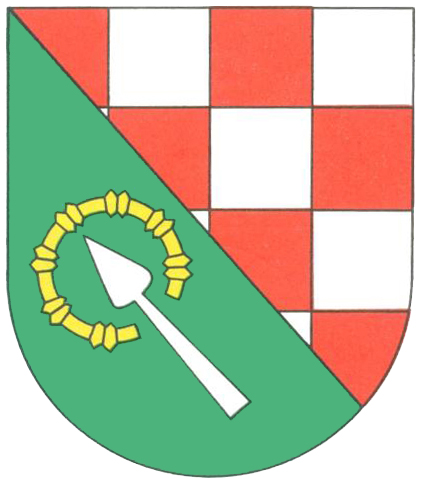
- Coat of arms

- Location of Rimsberg within Birkenfeld district
- Interactive map of Rimsberg
- Location within Germany Location within Rhineland-Palatinate
- Coordinates: 49°39′34″N 7°12′48″E
- Country: Germany
- State: Rhineland-Palatinate
- District: Birkenfeld
- Municipal assoc.: Birkenfeld

Government
  - Mayor (2019–24): Wolfram Müller

Area
  - Total: 3.19 km^{2} (1.23 sq mi)
- Elevation: 460 m (1,510 ft)

Population (2025-12-31)
  - Total: 127
  - Density: 39.8/km^{2} (103/sq mi)
- Time zone: UTC+01:00 (CET)
  - Summer (DST): UTC+02:00 (CEST)
- Postal codes: 55765
- Dialling codes: 06782
- Vehicle registration: BIR

Rimsberg is an Ortsgemeinde – a municipality belonging to a Verbandsgemeinde, a kind of collective municipality – in the Birkenfeld district in Rhineland-Palatinate, Germany. It belongs to the Verbandsgemeinde of Birkenfeld, whose seat is in the like-named town.

== Geography ==
=== Location ===
The municipality lies northwest of the district seat of Birkenfeld. To the north lies Schmißberg, and to the southeast, Nohen.

=== Constituent communities ===
Also belonging to Rimsberg are the outlying centre of Vogelsbüsch and the outlying homestead of Lindenhof.

== History ==
In 1269, Rimsberg had its first documentary mention in the “Schwarzenburg Document”. Its name was Rummersberg then, and later Rymsberg. In the years after 1465, there were 15 families living in Rimsberg, but after the Thirty Years' War, only one family was left. The houses were deserted and bare, plundered by Spanish troops, and the fields, too, were bare, for nobody was there to work them now. From 1665 to 1792, the village's name was Reinsberg, and until the late 18th century, it belonged to the “Hinder” County of Sponheim. After this, the village was under French rule until 1830. At this time, Rimsberg was called Rimsbach.

It was during the time of French rule that the notorious outlaw Johannes Bückler (1777–1803), commonly known as Schinderhannes, brought fear and dread to this part of Germany. Merchants with freight carts were ambushed in the woods by Schinderhannes's band of robbers and had everything stolen. In the end, though, Schinderhannes, together with his band, were caught, and in 1803 they were beheaded in Mainz by the French.

In 1835, the school was built. Shortly thereafter a fountain was installed in the garden and the school was given a bell. It was also about this time that a graveyard was laid out, which ended the practice of Rimsberg burying its dead in Nohen. Before the school was built, classes were taught at people's houses. According to the school chronicle, classes were taught at the school building from 1796 to 1966, when the school was closed. It has since become a community centre.

From 1750 to 1865, many families from Rimsberg emigrated. Two brothers with the surname Nagel went to Brazil to try their luck in 1835 after the agate pits began to become depleted. In 1865, a widow named Roth left for the United States in 1865 with her five children. Other families went to Hungary, Romania and Algeria.

On 31 July 1896, Rimsberg was struck by a heavy storm whose hail wiped the local farmers’ crops right out. Some houses lost their roofs, too. By contrast, the summers of 1911 and 1921 were so dry that there was a dearth of livestock fodder.

Many young men from Rimsberg lost their lives in France and Russia in the First World War. Much the same befell the village in the Second World War. Those from Rimsberg who fell or went missing now have their names on a memorial plaque at the old school.

Rimsberg was long a purely agricultural village. After 1945 only four farming families were left, all of whom worked the land as a secondary occupation. Until 1950, it was still done the time-honoured way, with oxen, cows and horses. Only then was work eased somewhat by tractors and threshing machines. In 1964, the village's first combine harvester was brought into service.

In 1959, farming began on a rapid decline until in 2000, there were only four families who still worked the land. Some of the forsaken farmland, however, has been sold or let to those who still earn their livelihoods in agriculture.

In 1931 and 1932, Rimsberg's watermain was completed, having been dug by hand. A smith from Birkenfeld named Weirich had set up a field smithy at the works to sharpen pickaxes and chisels. The field smithy was constantly at work with workers bringing their blunted tools to be sharpened. When the workers came up against particularly big or hard rocks, an explosives expert from Saarbrücken was standing by specially. The waterpipes themselves were sealed using pieces of tar and molten lead.

Upon the outbreak of the Second World War in 1939, men from the Wehrmacht were stationed in Rimsberg. The winter that year was also bitterly cold. One night there came a loud bang as the water pressure canister at the pumphouse flew through the pumphouse roof, landing 15 m away from the pumphouse in the bushes on Bornwieserweg. The pressure had apparently built up to dangerous levels. For a week, Rimsbergers were forced to return to their old well while the Wehrmacht officer in the village saw to it that the piece of equipment in question was repaired and set back in its former place.

In the 1960s, the volunteer fire brigade was founded. At first, it was rather primitively equipped, with a small, portable pumping unit, although eventually a fire engine with modern firefighting equipment was acquired, necessitating an expansion of fire station facilities. In 1970, the old pond was dredged and equipped to be a fire pond. The local fire brigade has won many prizes at contests within the Birkenfeld district for its speediness.

== Politics ==
=== Municipal council ===
The council is made up of 6 council members, who were elected by majority vote at the municipal election held on 7 June 2009, and the honorary mayor as chairman.

=== Mayor ===
Rimsberg's mayor is Wolfram Müller, re-elected in 2019.

=== Coat of arms ===
The German blazon reads: In schräggeteiltem Schild vorne in Grün ein goldener geöffneter Armreif, darin eine silberne schrägaufwärts gerichtete Lanzenspitze, hinten rot-silbern geschacht.

The municipality's arms might in English heraldic language be described thus: Per bend vert an armring with a gap Or pointing into which a lancehead bendwise argent, and chequy gules and argent.

The arms have been borne since 1965.

== Economy and infrastructure ==
=== Transport ===
Running west of the municipality is Bundesstraße 41, which to the south leads to the Autobahn A 62 (Kaiserslautern–Trier). Serving nearby Nohen is a railway station on the Nahe Valley Railway (Bingen–Saarbrücken).
