= Nohen =

- Municipality
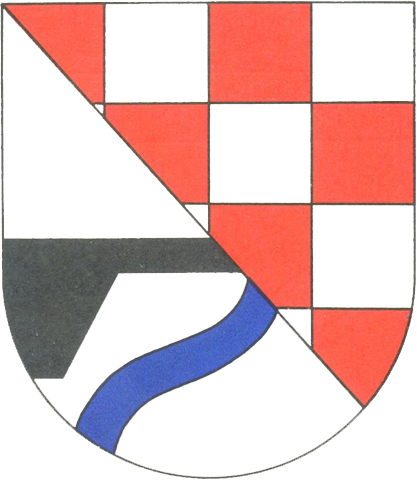
- Coat of arms

- Location of Nohen within Birkenfeld district
- Interactive map of Nohen
- Location within Germany Location within Rhineland-Palatinate
- Coordinates: 49°38′28″N 7°14′36″E
- Country: Germany
- State: Rhineland-Palatinate
- District: Birkenfeld
- Municipal assoc.: Birkenfeld

Government
  - Mayor (2019–24): Sascha Loch

Area
  - Total: 7.50 km^{2} (2.90 sq mi)
- Elevation: 458 m (1,503 ft)

Population (2025-12-31)
  - Total: 338
  - Density: 45.1/km^{2} (117/sq mi)
- Time zone: UTC+01:00 (CET)
  - Summer (DST): UTC+02:00 (CEST)
- Postal codes: 55767
- Dialling codes: 06789
- Vehicle registration: BIR

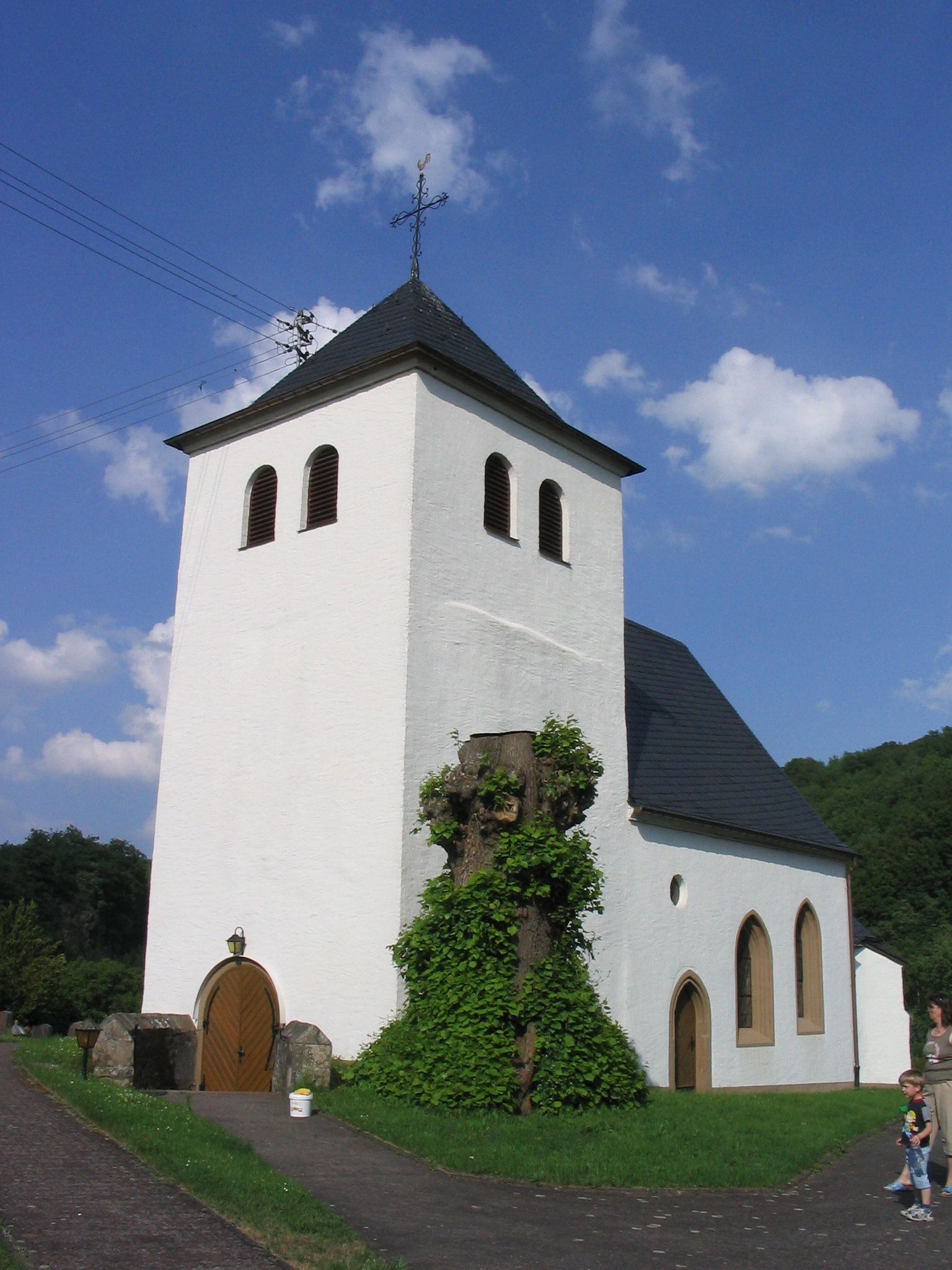
Nohen Evangelical Church

Nohen is an Ortsgemeinde – a municipality belonging to a Verbandsgemeinde, a kind of collective municipality – in the Birkenfeld district in Rhineland-Palatinate, Germany. It belongs to the Verbandsgemeinde of Birkenfeld, whose seat is in the like-named town.

== Geography ==
=== Location ===
The municipality lies at the mouth of the Röhmbach, where it empties into the Nahe.

=== Neighbouring municipalities ===
Nohen borders in the north on the municipality of Kronweiler, in the east on the municipality of Reichenbach, in the south on the municipality of Heimbach and in the west on the municipality of Rimsberg.

== History ==
Nohen's beginnings can be traced back to a time when the location was favourable to transportation because it lay on one of the few fords in the river Nahe's upper valley. As an indication of how important Nohen was geographically in those early days, one need only observe that it was then the only place along the river Nahe that was named after the river (the names “Nohen” and “Nahe” have a common heritage). It was here that one of the oldest north–south trade roads crossed the Nahe. This Bronzestraße (“Bronze Road”) from the Glan by way of Nohen to the Moselle was expanded in Roman times into a crosslink between the Mainz-Trier and Mainz-Metz roads.

The military-strategic importance of the road link with the ford, or later bridge, was great. On the night of 23 and 24 September 1635 and the following morning, a Swedish-French army under Duke Bernard of Saxe-Weimar’s leadership went slogging by across the river after their defeat at Nördlingen in the Thirty Years' War on their retreat by way of Birkenfeld to Wallerfangen, even as they were being pursued by the far superior, victorious Imperial army under Count Gallas.

Until the late 18th century, Nohen belonged to the “Hinder” County of Sponheim.

== Politics ==
=== Municipal council ===
The council is made up of 8 council members, who were elected by majority vote at the municipal election held on 7 June 2009, and the honorary mayor as chairman.

=== Mayor ===
Nohen's mayor is Sascha Loch.

=== Coat of arms ===
The German blazon reads: In schräggeteiltem Schild vorne in Silber eine in der Teilung geschnittene schwarze Brücke über schräglinkem blauen Wellenband, hinten rot-silbern geschacht.

The municipality's arms might in English heraldic language be described thus: Per bend argent a bridge couped at the line of partition sable above a bend sinister wavy abased azure, and chequy gules and argent.

The charges on the dexter (armsbearer's right, viewer's left) side refer to the bridge over the river Nahe (the wavy bend sinister), and the “chequy” field on the sinister (armsbearer's left, viewer's right) side is a reference to the village's former allegiance to the “Hinder” County of Sponheim, which bore arms chequy gules and argent. Nohen was in the Oberamt of Birkenfeld.

The arms have been borne since 20 June 1963.

== Culture and sightseeing ==
=== Buildings ===
The following are listed buildings or sites in Rhineland-Palatinate’s Directory of Cultural Monuments:

- Evangelical Parish Church, Hauptstraße – stepped building complex; west tower from the 14th century, possibly older (belfry from 1953), quire and nave Late Gothic (nave built higher in 18th century?); characterizes village’s appearance
- Hauptstraße 26 – Quereinhaus (a combination residential and commercial house divided for these two purposes down the middle, perpendicularly to the street), marked 1815
- Railway bridge on the Rhine-Nahe Railway – two-arch, brick-framed sandstone-block structure over the Nahe
- Footbridge, south of the village – light, rivetted iron-rod construction, on the left bank on quarry stone underpinnings
- Inscription stone, on the way to the warriors’ memorial – possibly from the 17th century
- Warriors’ memorial, southeast of the village – for those who fell in the First World War, seven crosses, 1924, expanded in 1961

== Economy and infrastructure ==
=== Transport ===
To the west runs Bundesstraße 41, and to the south, the Autobahn A 62 (Kaiserslautern–Trier). Nohen also has a station on the Nahe Valley Railway (Bingen–Saarbrücken).
