= Rhaunen (Verbandsgemeinde) =

Municipality in Rhineland-Palatinate, Germany

Coordinates: 49.865°N 7.340°E

Rhaunen is a former Verbandsgemeinde ("collective municipality") in the district of Birkenfeld, in Rhineland-Palatinate, Germany. The seat of the Verbandsgemeinde was in Rhaunen. On 1 January 2020 it was merged into the new Verbandsgemeinde Herrstein-Rhaunen.

== Municipalities ==
The Verbandsgemeinde Rhaunen consisted of the following Ortsgemeinden ("local municipalities"):

1. Asbach
2. Bollenbach
3. Bundenbach
4. Gösenroth
5. Hausen
6. Hellertshausen
7. Horbruch
8. Hottenbach
9. Krummenau
10. Oberkirn
11. Rhaunen
12. Schauren
13. Schwerbach
14. Stipshausen
15. Sulzbach
16. Weitersbach
