= Oberkirn =

- Municipality
- Coat of arms

- Location of Oberkirn within Birkenfeld district
- Interactive map of Oberkirn
- Location within Germany Location within Rhineland-Palatinate
- Coordinates: 49°53′04″N 7°22′17″E
- Country: Germany
- State: Rhineland-Palatinate
- District: Birkenfeld
- Municipal assoc.: Herrstein-Rhaunen

Government
  - Mayor (2019–24): Alfons Klingels

Area
  - Total: 5.45 km^{2} (2.10 sq mi)
- Elevation: 315 m (1,033 ft)

Population (2025-12-31)
  - Total: 321
  - Density: 58.9/km^{2} (153/sq mi)
- Time zone: UTC+01:00 (CET)
  - Summer (DST): UTC+02:00 (CEST)
- Postal codes: 55624
- Dialling codes: 06544
- Vehicle registration: BIR
- Website: www.oberkirn.de

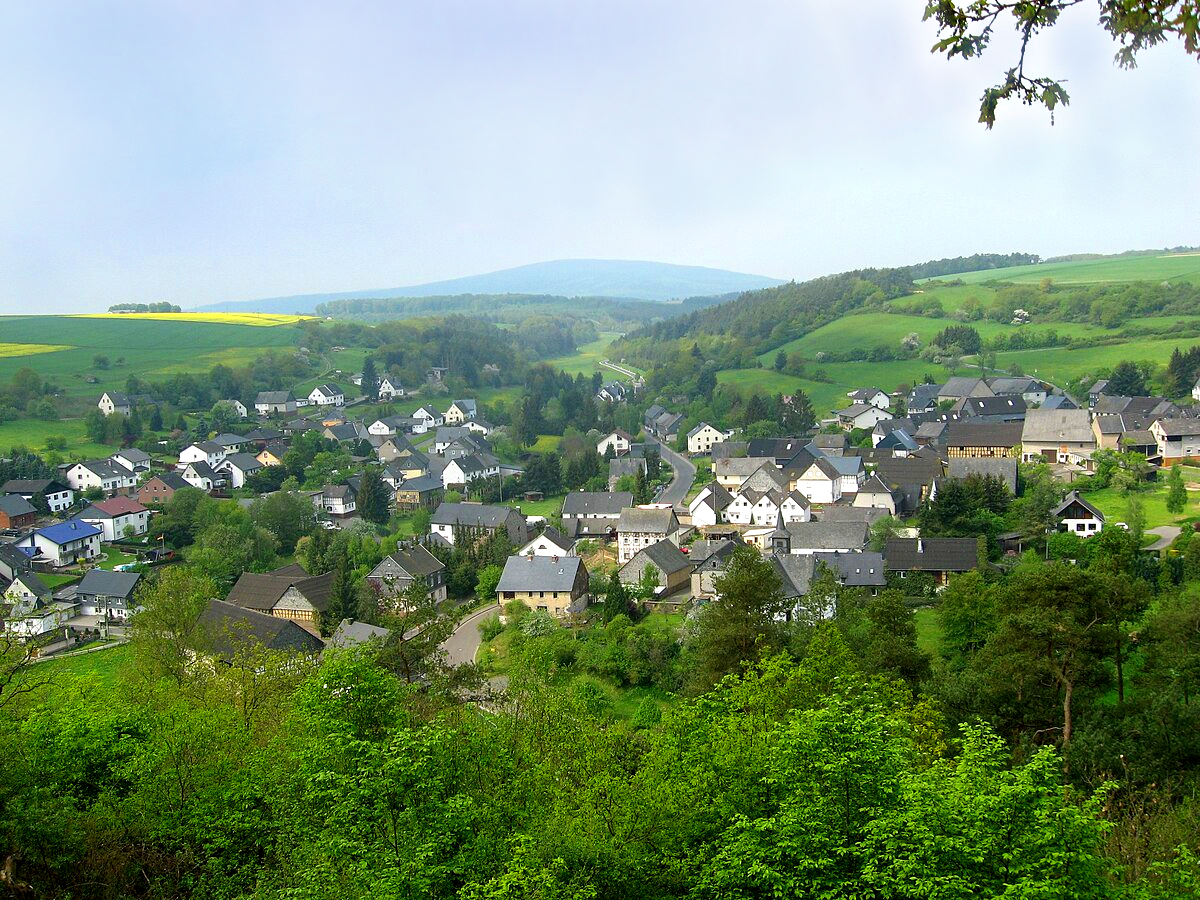
The village lies in the Kyrbach valley, in the background the Idarkopf

Oberkirn is an Ortsgemeinde – a municipality belonging to a Verbandsgemeinde, a kind of collective municipality – in the Birkenfeld district in Rhineland-Palatinate, Germany. It belongs to the Verbandsgemeinde Herrstein-Rhaunen, whose seat is in Herrstein.

== Geography ==
=== Location ===
The municipality lies in the Kyrbach valley between the Lützelsoon (a small, wooded plateau) to the southeast and the Idar Forest to the southwest, in the central Hunsrück.

As of 31 December 2010, Oberkirn's population is 333. The municipal area comprises some 200 ha of forest and another 300 ha of meadowland.

=== Neighbouring municipalities ===
Oberkirn's neighbours are Rhaunen, Gösenroth, Schwerbach, Lindenschied, Rohrbach, Woppenroth and Hausen.

== History ==
There was clearly a Roman presence in what is now Oberkirn, for the Evangelical church on the village's upper outskirts is built on the foundations of an old Roman villa rustica. The plain, Gothic church itself was built a few years before 1400 and houses the graves of the Schenken (roughly “Stewards”) at Schmidtburg, a sideline of that great comital dynasty from the Hahnenbach valley.

In 1335, Oberkirn had its first documentary mention as Overkehr. A legend has it that Oberkirn was once named Oberhausen, and that Oberhausen bei Kirn was then known as Oberkirn. Sometime over the course of the centuries, it is said, the two village's names were confused, and thereby exchanged, in a document. However, there is no scientific proof for this.

Slate was long quarried within Oberkirn's municipal limits, first for building houses and then, beginning in the 19th century until the 1960s for making roof slates. Most men in the village earned their livelihood at the pits, and then also worked the land as well. When cheaper artificial slates appeared on the market, the slate pits went out of business, the last one closing in 1966.

== Politics ==
=== Municipal council ===
The council is made up of 8 council members, who were elected by majority vote at the municipal election held on 7 June 2009, and the honorary mayor as chairman.

=== Mayor ===
Oberkirn's mayor is Alfons Klingels. He has held office since 17 August 1999.

=== Coat of arms ===
The German blazon reads: In geteiltem Schild oben in Gold ein rotes Fabeltier mit einem Wolfskopf und weit geöffneten Schwingen, belegt mit einem schwarzen Wolfshaken.Unten in Blau ein goldener Bischofsstab begleitet von zwei silbernen Schnallen.

The municipality's arms might in English heraldic language be described thus: Per fess Or a monster with a wolf's head and an eagle's body sans talons displayed gules, its breast charged with a cramp sable, and azure issuant from base a bishop's staff sinister of the first between two arming buckles argent.

The charge in the escutcheon’s upper field is a reference to the village's former allegiance to the Waldgravial-Rhinegravial high court of Rhaunen. The charges in the lower field refer to the Schenk of Schmidtburg, Lothar Karl Franz Josef, Cathedral Canon at Liège, Bishop Superior at Trier, Lord at Oberkirn (according to a plaque at the Church of Our Lady, or Liebfrauenkirche, in Trier) in the case of the bishop's staff, and the Amt of Schmidtburg in the case of the buckles. According to a 16th-century record, Oberkirn belonged to the Amt of Schmidtburg. Oberkirn and some other places had their own local court, over which presided the two Burgmannen Jakob and Henne Braun von Schmidtburg as lords of the court.

== Culture and sightseeing ==
=== Buildings ===
The following are listed buildings or sites in Rhineland-Palatinate’s Directory of Cultural Monuments:

- Evangelical church, Kirchstraße 7 – aisleless church with ridge turret, possibly from the 16th century, conversion in the 18th century; tomb slab, 1573
- Saint Mark's Catholic Church (Kirche St. Markus), Hauptstraße 8 – aisleless church with ridge turret, 1794, expansion 1968/1969
- Hauptstraße – bridge over the Kyrbach, two-arch slate quarrystone structure, marked 1878
- Hauptstraße 2 – house, marked 1850, essentially older
- Staureweg 1 – house with knee wall, partly timber-frame (slated), latter half of the 19th century

== Economy and infrastructure ==
Oberkirn has a village community centre. To the north lie Bundesstraße 50 and Frankfurt-Hahn Airport.
