= Hausen, Birkenfeld =

Hausen
- Municipality
- Coat of arms

- Location of Hausen within Birkenfeld district
- Interactive map of Hausen
- Location within Germany Location within Rhineland-Palatinate
- Coordinates: 49°52′21″N 7°22′39″E
- Country: Germany
- State: Rhineland-Palatinate
- District: Birkenfeld
- Municipal assoc.: Herrstein-Rhaunen

Government
  - Mayor (2019–24): Herbert Friedrich

Area
  - Total: 4.99 km^{2} (1.93 sq mi)
- Elevation: 300 m (980 ft)

Population (2025-12-31)
  - Total: 172
  - Density: 34.5/km^{2} (89.3/sq mi)
- Time zone: UTC+01:00 (CET)
  - Summer (DST): UTC+02:00 (CEST)
- Postal codes: 55608
- Dialling codes: 06544
- Vehicle registration: BIR

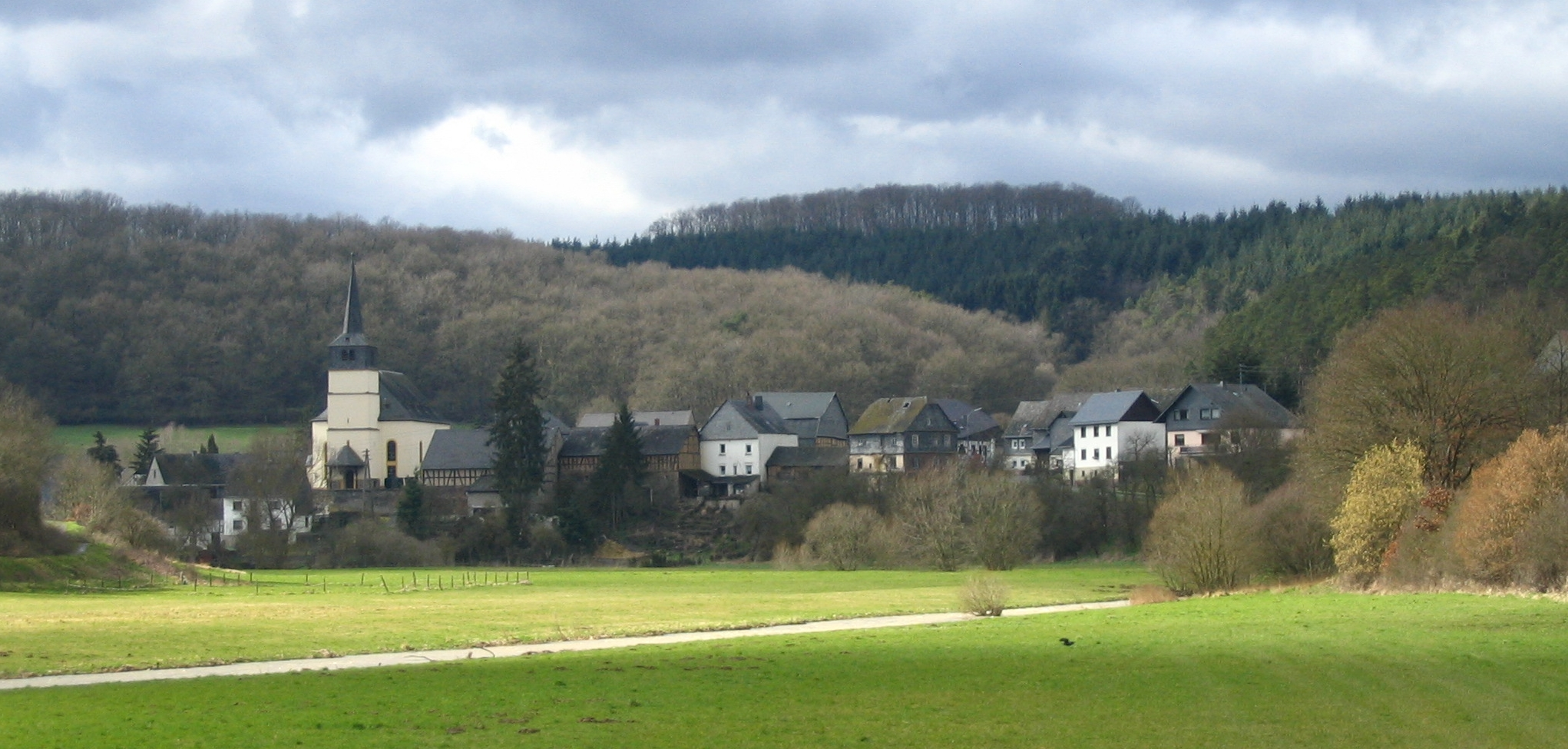
Hausen

Hausen (German pronunciation: [ˈhaʊzn̩]) is an Ortsgemeinde – a municipality belonging to a Verbandsgemeinde, a kind of collective municipality – in the Birkenfeld district in Rhineland-Palatinate, Germany. It belongs to the Verbandsgemeinde Herrstein-Rhaunen, whose seat is in Herrstein.

== Geography ==
=== Location ===
The municipality lies in the Hahnenbach valley in the central Hunsrück. Its elevation is 300 m above sea level.

=== Neighbouring municipalities ===
Hausen borders the municipality of Oberkirn to the north, the municipality of Woppenroth (Rhein-Hunsrück-Kreis) to the east, the municipality of Bundenbach to the south, and the municipality of Rhaunen to the west.

== History ==
In 1051, Hausen had its first documentary mention, although the village may be even older, for even then, it had a church. With this church, this village set on top of a cliff terrace overlooking a great bend in the Kyrbach was already earning considerable importance in the Middle Ages as the hub of a great parish, to which, among others, Laufersweiler, Woppenroth, Lindenschied, Oberkirn and Schwerbach belonged.

While Laufersweiler split away from the parish quite early on, Woppenroth entered into parochial ties with Dickenschied beginning in 1976, after the 1969 administrative restructuring in Rhineland-Palatinate. Within the same framework, Lindenschied had its own parochial ties transferred from Hausen to Dickenschied. Both municipalities thus also switched from the Trier church district to the Simmern-Trarbach church district. The Hausen Evangelical parish now encompasses the villages of Hausen, Oberkirn (which has its own church) and Schwerbach.

The church, originally consecrated to Saint Remigius, still has its Romanesque quire tower with its four tapering floors. The aisleless three-sided structure behind it was built on only in 1747 after the mediaeval nave had fallen into disrepair.

The historical village centre can be found tightly grouped about the church, but there is a newer centre in the village over on a slope. Running from there from the place where the dale broadens out is a farm lane leading to the outlying farmsteads (Aussiedlerhöfe) and then on towards Gösenroth, which follows an old Schmidtburg Ritter- und Pfaffenstraße (“knight and parson road” – those two social classes were then particularly mobile), which likely was already used in Roman times, and which later served as one of the most important transport links between the castles on the Nahe and the Moselle.

Besides agriculture, forestry and mills, of which the Hausener Bauernmühle on the Idarbach can still be seen, slate mining also held great importance right up to the mid 20th century. In the heavily wooded Kaschecktälchen (a small dale) between Hausen and Oberkirn, great waste heaps and various other relics from the Layen quarry can still be seen.

== Politics ==
=== Municipal council ===
The council is made up of 6 council members, who were elected by majority vote at the municipal election held on 7 June 2009, and the honorary mayor as chairman.

=== Mayor ===
Hausen's mayor is Herbert Friedrich.

=== Coat of arms ===
The German blazon reads: In gespaltenem Schild vorne in Gold ein blaubewehrter und -gezungter roter Löwe, hinten in Rot ein silbernes Haus mit 2 schwarzen Fenstern und einer Tür.

The municipality's arms might in English heraldic language be described thus: Per pale Or a lion rampant sinister gules armed and langued azure and gules a house argent masoned sable with two windows and one door of the same.

The German blazon does not mention that the lion is supposed to be sinister (that is, facing heraldic left, which is the armsbearer's left and viewer's right).

The lion on the dexter (armsbearer's right, viewer's left) side is a reference to the village's former allegiance to the Waldgraves and Rhinegraves. The house on the sinister (armsbearer's left, viewer's right) side is a canting charge for the municipality's name, Hausen, derived from the word Haus (“house”). This is drawn from Hausen's official 18th-century seal, the original stamp for which is at the Rheinisches Landesmuseum Bonn.

== Culture and sightseeing ==
=== Buildings ===
The following are listed buildings or sites in Rhineland-Palatinate’s Directory of Cultural Monuments:

- Saint John’s Evangelical Parish Church (Pfarrkirche St. Johann), between Hauptstraße 33 and 35 – Romanesque east tower (slated timber-frame floor less old), nave with three-sided structure behind, 1747, Baroque Revival portal porches, 1913; characterizes village’s and landscape’s appearance
- Across from Hauptstraße 26 – bakehouse with bare oven under a roof, late 19th century
- Hauptstraße 52 – house, partly slated timber-frame, half-hipped roof, 19th century
- Im Bongert 1 – two-leafed house door, echoes of Art Nouveau, marked 1923

Also to be seen locally is the Altburg, an ancient Celtic settlement. This lies along the Sirona-Weg (trail), through the Hahnenbach valley.

== Economy and infrastructure ==
=== Transport ===
Serving nearby Kirn is a railway station on the Nahe Valley Railway (Bingen–Saarbrücken). To the north lie Bundesstraße 50 and Frankfurt-Hahn Airport.

=== Public institutions ===
The municipality has a village community centre known as the Alte Schule (“Old School”). It was built in 1928.

=== Established businesses ===
There are currently two inns in the village, “Zur Schönen Au” and “Zur Dorfschänke”. The Pintohof Kyrbachtal offers holidays on the farm with cabins and guided riding tours.
