= Sulzbach, Birkenfeld =

Sulzbach
- Municipality
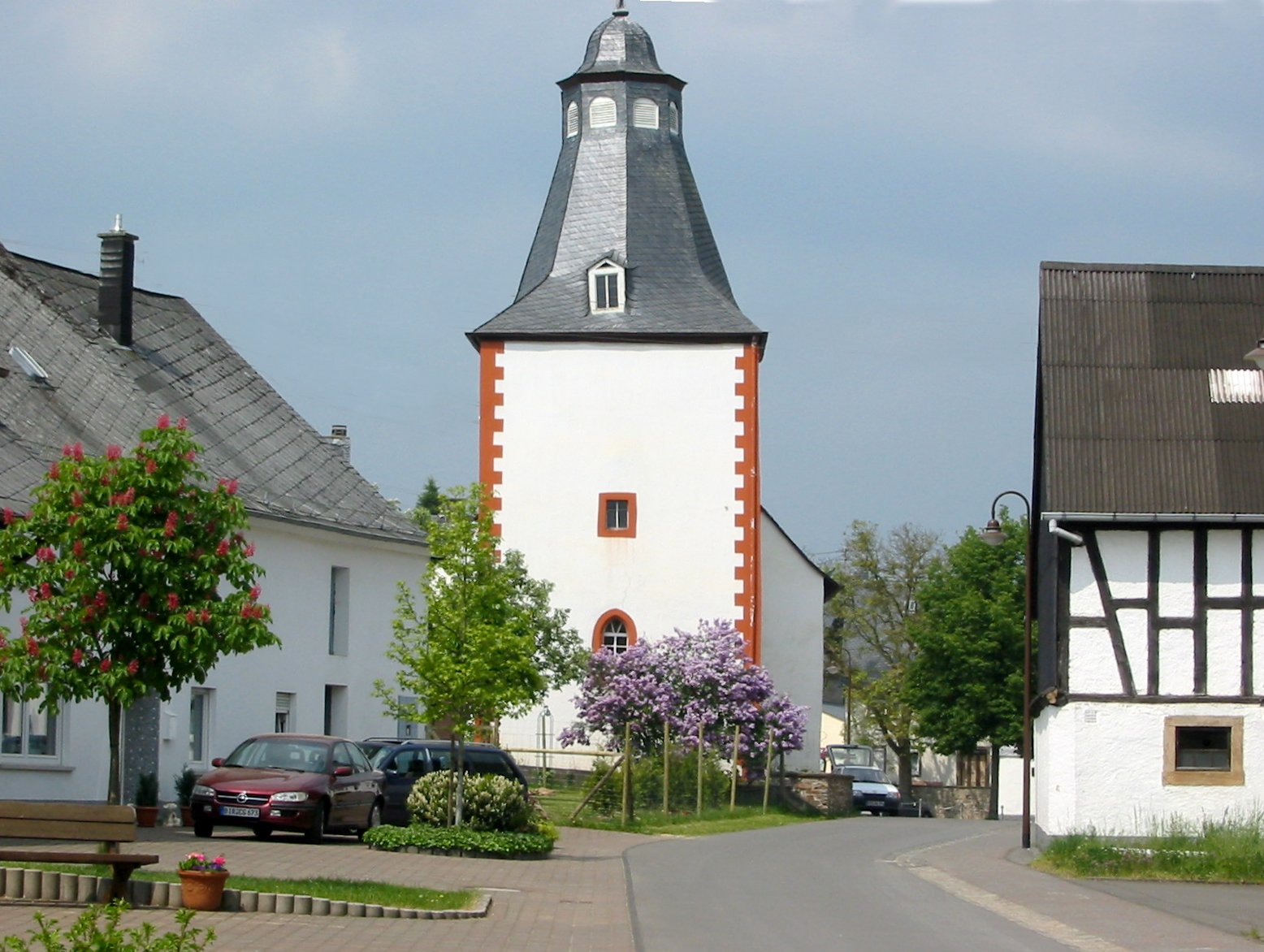
- Sulzbach church with Stumm organ

- Coat of arms

- Location of Sulzbach within Birkenfeld district
- Interactive map of Sulzbach
- Location within Germany Location within Rhineland-Palatinate
- Coordinates: 49°50′3″N 7°20′20″E
- Country: Germany
- State: Rhineland-Palatinate
- District: Birkenfeld
- Municipal assoc.: Herrstein-Rhaunen

Government
  - Mayor (2019–24): Horst Schmäler

Area
  - Total: 6.68 km^{2} (2.58 sq mi)
- Elevation: 460 m (1,510 ft)

Population (2025-12-31)
  - Total: 284
  - Density: 42.5/km^{2} (110/sq mi)
- Time zone: UTC+01:00 (CET)
  - Summer (DST): UTC+02:00 (CEST)
- Postal codes: 55758
- Dialling codes: 06544
- Vehicle registration: BIR

Sulzbach (German pronunciation: [ˈzʊltsbax]), also called Rhaunensulzbach, is an Ortsgemeinde – a municipality belonging to a Verbandsgemeinde, a kind of collective municipality – in the Birkenfeld district in Rhineland-Palatinate, Germany. It belongs to the Verbandsgemeinde Herrstein-Rhaunen, whose seat is in Herrstein.

== Geography ==
=== Location ===
The municipality lies on a ridge in the southern Hunsrück between Rhaunen and Herrstein.

=== Neighbouring municipalities ===
Sulzbach borders in the north and northwest on the municipality of Rhaunen, in the east on the municipality of Bollenbach, in the southeast on the municipality of Wickenrodt, in the south on the municipality of Oberhosenbach and in the southwest on the municipality of Hottenbach.

== History ==
Sulzbach's church was consecrated by 1326, and its solidly built tower bears witness to its once having been a fortified church.

Sulzbach's historical claim to fame stems from the birth of two industries of rather disproportionate importance to the village's size. Both also sprang from the same family. The Sulzbach village smith, Johann Nikolaus Stumm (born 1669), bought up several old Hunsrück hammermills and ran them with such great success that he became the father of the Saarland’s smelting industry. The later “iron barons” of the family Stumm dominated and characterized the Saar region's economic history for a good two hundred years.

While Johann Nikolaus might have been said to concern himself with the “rougher” things in life as an industrialist, his younger brother, Johann Michael Stumm (born 1683) was rather one who concerned himself with the finer things in life. Johann Michael was a skilled goldsmith and a music lover, and became the founder of the Stumm organ-building “dynasty”. His last instrument, completed in 1746, is still in service at the church in his home village. The first Stumm organ ever built was installed in the church in the neighbouring village of Rhaunen in 1723. All together, Johann Michael Stumm and his descendants built roughly 370 organs in Sulzbach, installing them in churches in the region whose limits are marked by Saarbrücken, Karlsruhe and the Middle Rhine.

Right near Sulzbach lies the historical Heuchelheim marketplace at the fork in an ancient trade road between the Glan and the Moselle. This road was already in use in the Bronze Age, was expanded in Roman times and continued to be used on into the Middle Ages. One fork led by way of Rhaunen and Büchenbeuren to Enkirch, while the other ran straight over the Idarkopf to the Temple of Sirona in Hochscheid, and onwards to a junction in the Zolleiche district with the ancient Via Ausonia (or Ausoniusstraße in German), which itself runs between Bingen and Trier. Heuchelheim market was also the location of a Celtic-Roman worship centre, which later served as the mediaeval Rhaunen high court's thingstead (the court was an administrative body as much as it was a judicial one). In 1829, the plot was still known as Galgenfeld (“Gallows Field”). Sometime after 1870, its appearance was enhanced with the planting of some trees in a Kaisergarten (“Emperor’s Garden”). Today it is a place for picnicking and recreation.

== Politics ==
=== Municipal council ===
The council is made up of 8 council members, who were elected by majority vote at the municipal election held on 7 June 2009, and the honorary mayor as chairman.

=== Mayor ===
Sulzbach's mayor is Horst Schmäler.

=== Coat of arms ===
The German blazon reads: In geteiltem Schild oben in Gold ein rotes Fabeltier mit einem Wolfskopf und weit geöffneten Schwingen belegt mit einem schwarzen Wolfshaken, unten in Blau elf silberne Orgelpfeifen.

The municipality's arms might in English heraldic language be described thus: Per fess Or a monster with a wolf's head and an eagle's body sans talons displayed gules, its breast charged with a cramp sable, and azure a range of eleven organ pipes argent.

The charge above the line of partition is a reference to the village's former allegiance to the Waldgraviate-Rhinegraviate and indeed is the heraldic device once used in the Waldgravial-Rhinegravial court seal at Rhaunen. The charge below, the organ pipes, refers to the well known family Stumm, who came from Sulzbach.

== Culture and sightseeing ==
=== Buildings ===
The following are listed buildings or sites in Rhineland-Palatinate’s Directory of Cultural Monuments:

- Evangelical church, Hinterdorfstraße – aisleless church from the earlier half of the 18th century, east tower dendrochronologically dated to 1367 on the ground floor, 1473 on the upper floor; décor, organ, marked 1746, by Johann Michael Stumm; two steel bells from the Bochumer Verein, 1924
- Hauptstraße 18 – Genossenschaftsmühle (“Cooperative Mill”); building with half-hipped roof; equipment
- Kirchstraße, at the graveyard – warriors’ memorial, sandstone stele with relief, crowned with the Iron Cross, 1929, firm of F. Ritter and successors
- Kirchstraße 12 – former school; subdivided building with roofs reaching far down, country house style, echoes of Expressionism, 1913–1915
- Pflasterstraße 1 – timber-frame bungalow with knee wall, late 19th century

=== Stumm organ ===
A functional example of a Stumm organ can be found at the village church. It was the last one that Johann Michael Stumm ever made, and he donated it to his home village. There are regular concerts staged by the Sulzbach Stumm Organ Club (Stummorgelverein Sulzbach).

== Economy and infrastructure ==
Although the village has an agricultural character, it also lives off tourism (holidaymaking in the country or on the farm) and slate processing. Sulzbach does have its own slate mine, about a kilometre from the village, where underground mining was once done, but owing to slate imports, mainly from Spain, only the processing is done nowadays.

== Famous people ==
- Christian Stumm, smith, two of whose sons became important entrepreneurs: Johann Nikolaus Stumm (1668–1743) built a hammermill in 1714. Johann Michael Stumm (1683–1747) founded an organ workshop the same year
- Carolin Schmäler, German Gemstone Queen 2006–2008.
