= Giehl =

- the estate of Giehl
- Brett Giehl a.k.a. Dalton Castle (wrestler)
- Tobias Giehl, athlete
