= Rhaunen =

- Municipality
- Coat of arms

- Location of Rhaunen within Birkenfeld district
- Interactive map of Rhaunen
- Location within Germany Location within Rhineland-Palatinate
- Coordinates: 49°51′53″N 7°20′35″E
- Country: Germany
- State: Rhineland-Palatinate
- District: Birkenfeld
- Municipal assoc.: Herrstein-Rhaunen

Government
  - Mayor (2019–24): Manfred Klingel (SPD)

Area
  - Total: 10.75 km^{2} (4.15 sq mi)
- Elevation: 318 m (1,043 ft)

Population (2025-12-31)
  - Total: 2,281
  - Density: 212.2/km^{2} (549.6/sq mi)
- Time zone: UTC+01:00 (CET)
  - Summer (DST): UTC+02:00 (CEST)
- Postal codes: 55624
- Dialling codes: 06544
- Vehicle registration: BIR
- Website: www.rhaunen.de

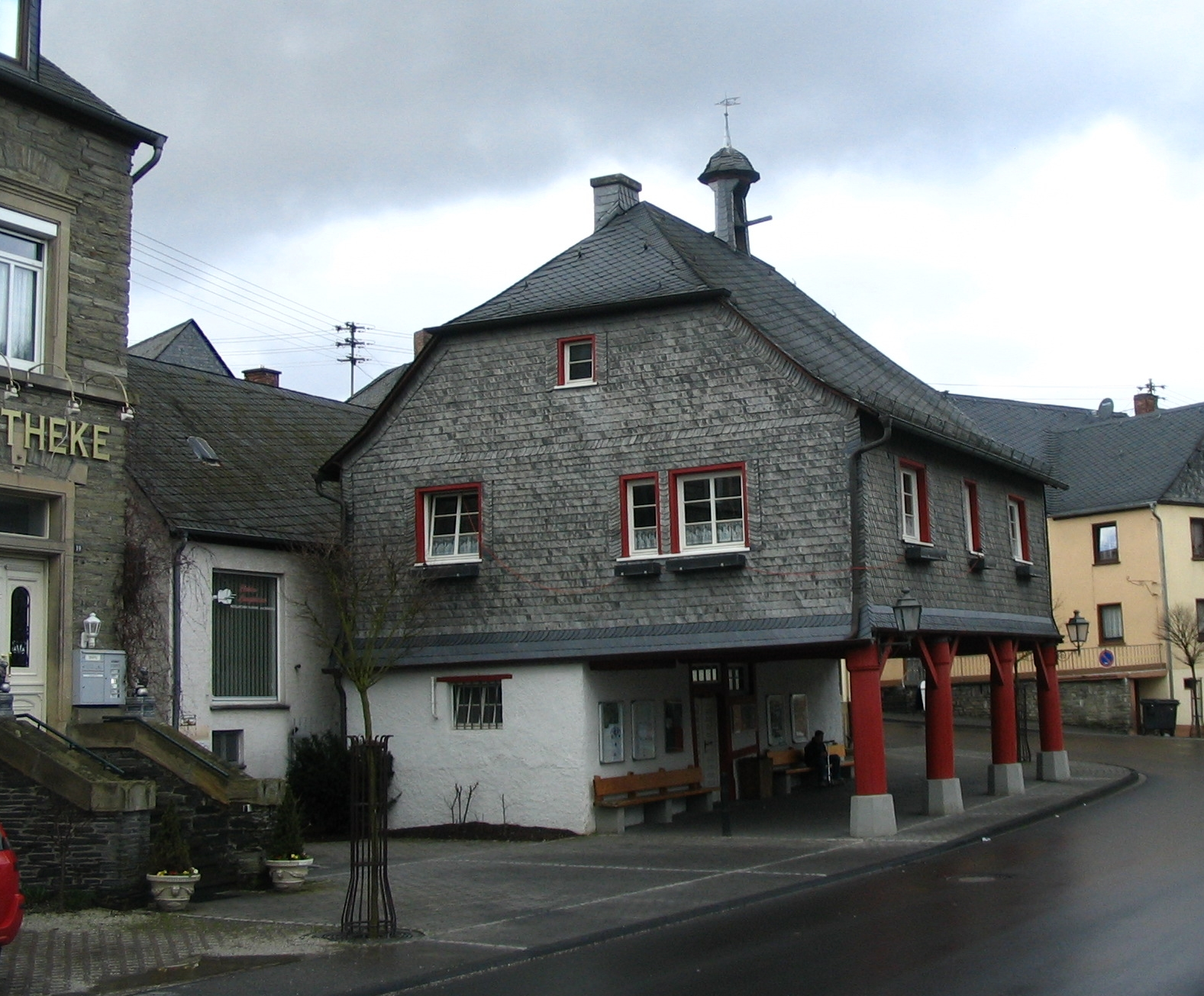
Old Town Hall in the village centre

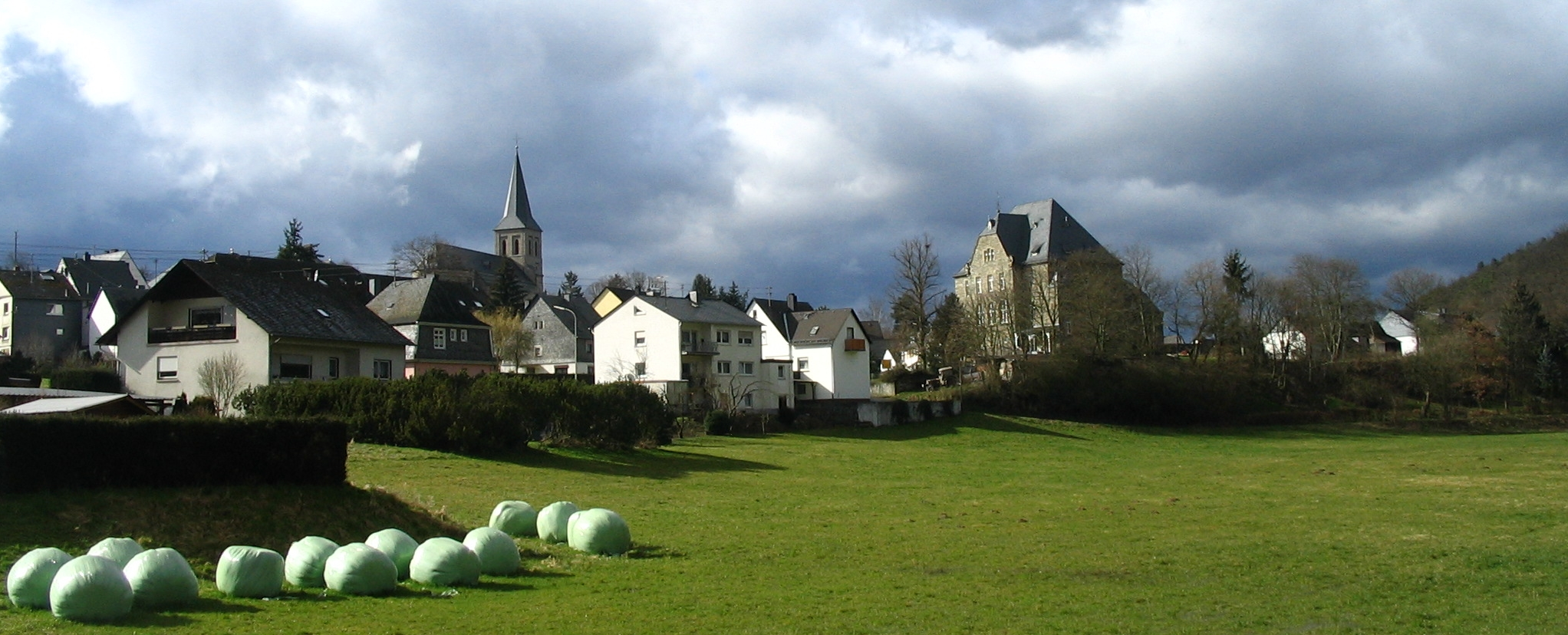
View from the east with Altes Amtsgericht (court) and church

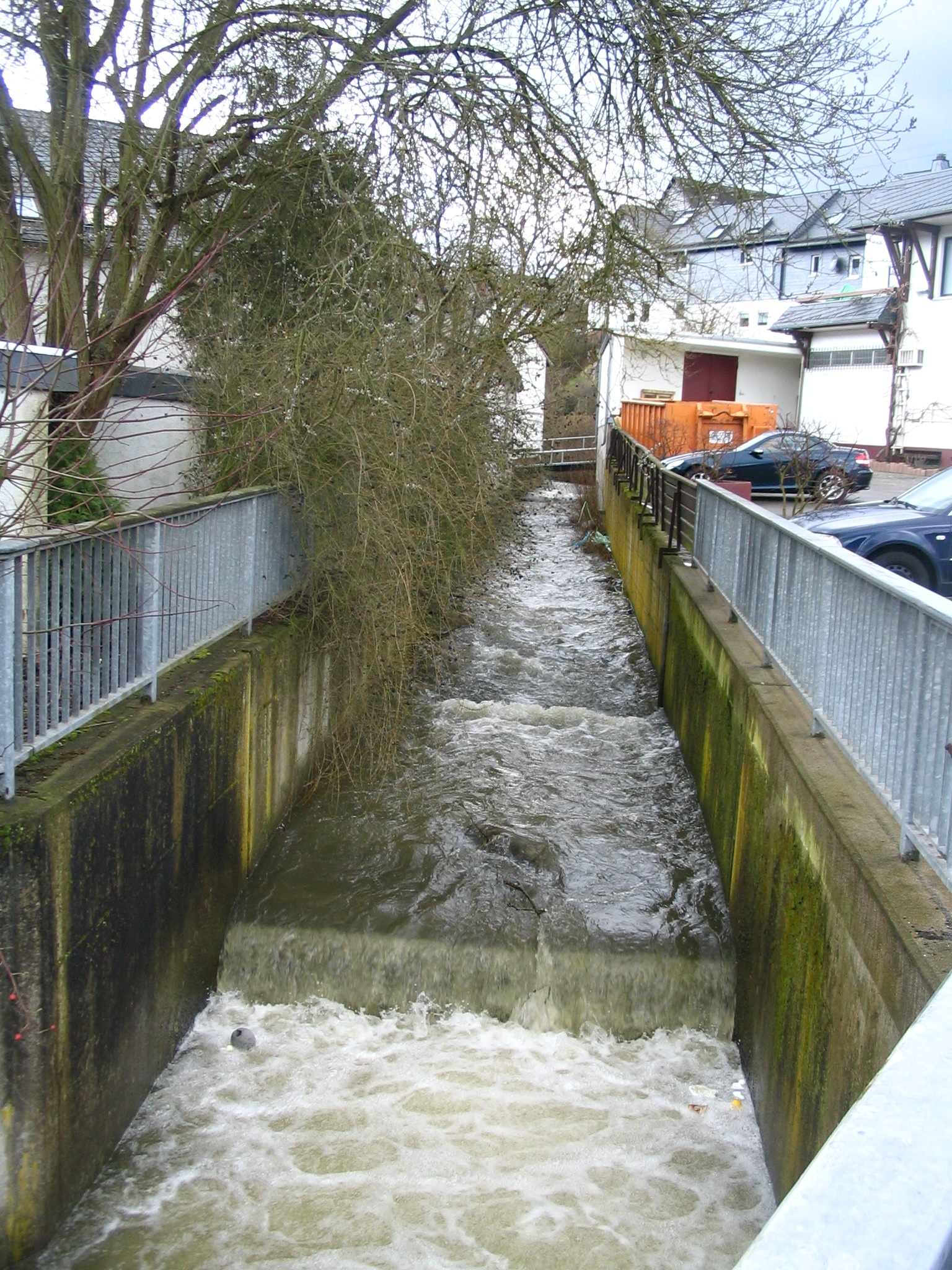
The Rhaunelbach runs through a concrete channel within the village

Rhaunen is an Ortsgemeinde – a municipality belonging to a Verbandsgemeinde, a kind of collective municipality – in the Birkenfeld district in Rhineland-Palatinate, Germany. It was the seat of the former Verbandsgemeinde Rhaunen.

== Geography ==
=== Location ===
The municipality lies at the Idar Forest in the Hunsrück in a sprawling, well watered hollow. The hollow separates the Idar Forest massif from the Soonwald massif. Within the village itself, the Lingenbach empties into the Rhaunelbach, which itself, along with the Näßbach, the Macherbach and the Büdenbach, empties into the Idarbach.

The nearest major centres are Idar-Oberstein, Simmern, Morbach and Kirn.

=== Constituent communities ===
Also belonging to Rhaunen are the outlying centre of Neuzenbrunnen and the homesteads of Hochwälderhof and Königstein.

=== Geology ===
The solid rock in Rhaunen, Hunsrück slate, comes down from the Devonian. The hollow in which Rhaunen lies was formed by the many brooks that flow together here and that shaped various alluvial fans, which have very loamy subsoil. The Hunsrück slate can be found on the slopes overlooking the hollow, whereas the floodplains down in the dale are characterized by loaminess. While the slopes are mostly covered with mixed forests, meadowland is to be found in the dales, and on the higher-lying terraces and hills, cropraising. The slate was once intensively used as a building material, both for roofing and building walls. Even the many public buildings built in Rhaunen about the turn of the 20th century have unplastered walls made of slate quarrystone. Of the many slate quarries that were once to be found in the dales around Rhaunen, none is still in business. Here and there, though, tailing heaps can still be seen. The biggest operation in the slatemining business was the “Abenstern” quarry on the Wartenberg, going towards Hausen. It was quarrying slate until the late 1950s. The high ridges, of the Idar Forest massif for example, are formed of the most extremely weathering-resistant Taunus quartzite, whose effect on the land is to leave it rather useless for agriculture, although not altogether unusable in forestry. This Taunus quartzite harbours bog iron deposits, which until about the middle of the 19th century were mined and smelted. This was done at the Weitersbacher Hütte (ironworks) near Rhaunen.

=== Climate ===
Yearly precipitation in Rhaunen amounts to 744 mm, which falls into the middle third of the precipitation chart for all Germany. At 50% of the German Weather Service's weather stations lower figures are recorded. The driest month is April. The most rainfall comes in November. In that month, precipitation is 1.4 times what it is in April. Precipitation varies only slightly and is spread quite evenly throughout the year. Only at 1% of the weather stations are lower seasonal swings recorded.

== History ==
Given the central location, the place now called Rhaunen was already settled in Roman times, as witnessed by the sandstone blocks in the Evangelical church's north wall, which were formerly walled up. Rhunanu, first named in a record from Lorch Abbey (not to be confused with Lorsch Abbey) in the late 8th century, crops up again in 841 as Rhuna in a donation to Fulda Abbey. Rhaunen became the seat of the like-named high court district. Until the 14th century, the Waldgraves were the unqualified owners of the court and the places that it governed. Besides Rhaunen itself, these were Bollenbach, Bruschied, Bundenbach, Gösenroth, Hausen, Krummenau, Laufersweiler, Lindenschied, Oberkirn, Schwerbach, Stipshausen, Sulzbach, Weitersbach and Woppenroth. Also under the court's sway was the Schmidtburg. With this Waldgravial castle’s loss to Archbishop Baldwin of Trier in 1330, however, part of the court’s territory in the form of three villages also passed to the Electorate of Trier. Baldwin also managed at the same stroke to relieve the Waldgraves of one fourth of the high court. Territorial relations remained so until an end was put to the Old Empire in the late 18th century and the old mediaeval governmental body, the court, was likewise swept away.

In the course of the French occupation of the lands on the Rhine’s left bank in the wake of the Treaty of Lunéville, Rhaunen was grouped into the Department of Sarre, the arrondissement of Birkenfeld and the canton of Rhaunen. After the French withdrew in 1814, Rhaunen found itself in Prussia’s new Rhine Province, also becoming the seat of a Bürgermeisterei (“mayoralty”) in the Bernkastel-Kues district. Parts of the old high court district, however – Bundenbach, for instance – now belonged to the Principality of Birkenfeld, an exclave of the Grand Duchy of Oldenburg, most of whose territory was in what is now northwest Germany, with a coastline on the North Sea. Even after the First World War, through the Weimar Republic and on through the time of the Third Reich, Rhaunen was the administrative seat for the surrounding villages. In the course of administrative restructuring in the 1960s, the Amt of Rhaunen became the Verbandsgemeinde of Rhaunen in the Birkenfeld district. This arrangement still stands.

The Baroque house at Otto-Conradt-Straße 5 (until 1978, Am Bach 5) was the Waldgravial Oberamtshaus (administrative centre of the Oberamt), and later, through inheritance, it fulfilled the same function for the comital family of Salm. Under French rule, it was the Gendarmerie barracks. In Prussian times, it first became a Catholic rectory, and then until 1899 a court building. Today it is an inn. The Amtmann who oversaw the Electoral-Trier fourth of the Rhaunen high court sat at the Schmidtburg (near Bundenbach).

The parish of Rhaunen comprised not only the like-named village but also Sulzbach, Weitersbach and, until 1504, Stipshausen. Rhaunen had a simultaneous church beginning in 1685, used by both Catholics and Evangelicals. This arrangement lasted more than two centuries, until 1887/1888, when the Catholic community built its own church on the way out of the village towards Sulzbach. Rhaunen was for centuries a judiciary, administrative and commercial hub. Its development peaked in Prussian times when it had the mayor's office, the Amt court and prison on the way out of the village towards Hausen, the chief forester's house on Hauptstraße, a notary's office, the cadastral office – later a professional college – on Poststraße on the way out of the village towards Bundenbach, a dairy likewise there, Catholic and Evangelical churches, a synagogue on Salzengasse and a hospital on the way out of the village towards Stipshausen, although this last site has been occupied since the 1960s by the Verbandsgemeinde administration building. Over the last few decades, though, with the growth of regional centres, the village has gradually lost its functions as a centre. Still left, however, are the Verbandsgemeinde administration, the two churches and a Mittelpunktschule (“midpoint school”, a central school, designed to eliminate smaller outlying schools) on the road towards Weitersbach.

The long timespan during which Rhaunen functioned as a centre for the other local villages has left its mark on the village's structure: Unlike the scattered settlement pattern seen in most of its neighbours, Rhaunen has a much more heavily concentrated built-up centre. The old neighbourhoods can still be made out in the three heavily built-up blocks bounded by Otto-Conradt-Straße (formerly called Am Bach, for its geographical location alongside the brook), Unterdorf, Hauptstraße, Straße am Wartenberg and Marktplatz (“Marketplace”). The church stands a short way outside this zone on a slope overlooking the village. This seemingly odd location is explained by the church's construction on top of an existing building – one of Roman origin.

== Politics ==
=== Municipal council ===
The council is made up of 16 council members, who were elected at the municipal election held on 7 June 2009, and the honorary mayor as chairman.

The municipal election held on 7 June 2009 yielded the following results:

Year	SPD	CDU	WGR	Total
2009	7	4	5	16 seats
2004	6	7	3	16 seats

=== Mayor ===
Rhaunen's mayor is Manfred Klingel, and his deputies are Sascha Diepmanns, Anneliese Hammes and Andreas Endres.

=== Coat of arms ===
The German blazon reads: In schrägrechts geteiltem Schild, oben in Gold ein roter, blaubewehrter und -gezungter Löwe. Unten in Schwarz ein silberner Wolfskopf.

The municipality's arms might in English heraldic language be described thus: Per bend sable a wolf's head couped argent, and Or a lion rampant gules armed and langued azure.

The charge on the dexter (armsbearer's right, viewer's left) side, the wolf's head, was drawn from a 1711 seal used by the Rhaunen high court, while the one on the sinister (armsbearer's left, viewer's right) side, the lion, is a reference to the village's former allegiance to the Waldgraves and Rhinegraves.

=== Town partnerships ===
Rhaunen fosters partnerships with the following places:

- (Germany) Drebach, Erzgebirgskreis, Saxony
- Saint-Valérien, Yonne, France

== Culture and sightseeing ==
=== Buildings ===
The following are listed buildings or sites in Rhineland-Palatinate’s Directory of Cultural Monuments:

- Evangelical parish church, Schustergasse 3 – aisleless church, about 1700; Late Gothic three-sided apse and west gable; north tower from the latter half of the 13th century, pointed spire about 1570; décor; organ 1723 by Johann Michael Stumm; characterizes village's appearance
- Saint Martin's Catholic Parish Church (Pfarrkirche St. Martin), Kirchstraße – three-naved Gothic Revival hall church, 1887/1888, built to plans by the Franciscan Paschalis (secularly: Theodor Gratze), Warendorf; characterizes village's appearance
- Am Wartenberg 2 – corner house, partly timber-frame (slated), early 18th century; characterizes village's appearance
- Am Wartenberg 3 – blocky building with hipped roof, late 19th century
- Hauptstraße 8 – town hall; building with half-hipped roof and council loggia, partly timber-frame (slated), belfry, marked 1723
- Hauptstraße 10 – former Amtshaus (Amt administrative centre); Late Historicist slate quarrystone building, Renaissance Revival, 1901
- Hauptstraße 43 – forester's office; Swiss chalet style building, 1911
- Kirchstraße 3 – Catholic rectory; Late Classicist solid building, 1863
- Otto-Conrad-Straße 3 – former Waldgravial estate; plastered building with mansard roof, from the latter half of the 18th century
- Poststraße 18 – former cadastral office; slightly asymmetrically grouped buildings with mansard roofs, 1911
- Pühlstraße 35/37 – former Royal Amt Court with prison and prison yard; castlelike Baroque Revival slate quarrystone complex, 1899; equipment
- Salzengasse 1 – Gründerzeit house with gable with exposed rafters, late 19th century
- Salzengasse 3 – former Catholic school; blocky building with hipped roof, Rundbogenstil, 1862
- Schulstraße 9 – former new school; three-winged complex, 1928, architect Nicolaus Coenen, Bernkastel
- Unterdorf 8 – stately house, partly timber-frame (plastered), mansard roof, about 1800
- Unterdorf 12 – house, partly timber-frame, partly slated, 18th century
- Jewish graveyard, east of the village in the woods (monumental zone) – 33 gravestones in two rows, earliest from 1893; front sides mainly in Hebrew, backs inscribed in Latin

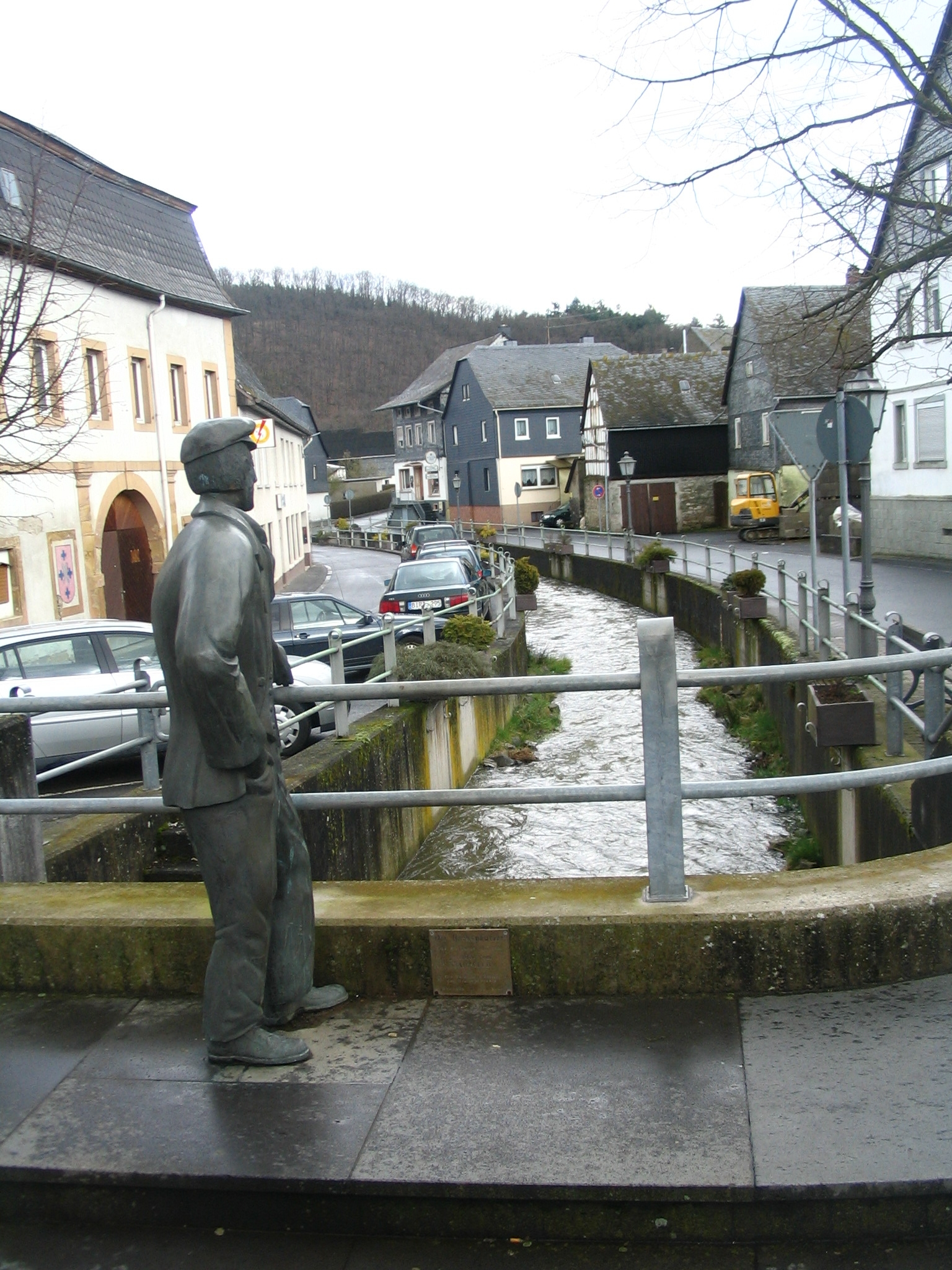
The Bachspautzer

The organ at the Evangelical church is from 1723, making it the oldest preserved Stumm organ. Information about the various buildings of interest around the village is presented on historical plaques for visitors. At the Verbandsgemeinde administration building, visitors can see local Roman archaeological finds. Standing on a bridge over the ugly concrete channel through which the Rhaunelbach runs within the village – it is a flood-control measure – is a bronze statue, a personification of the Bachspautzer (roughly “Brook Spitter”), a traditional nickname for people from Rhaunen.

=== Parks ===
The Wartenberg, a mountain that forms a semicircle around Rhaunen, has many trails and good views of the village below.

=== Natural monuments ===
The ancient menhir standing at the way out of the village towards Stipshausen, a quartzite block known as the Königsstein (“King’s Stone”), is not a natural monument in the usual sense, but the slate plaque there identifies it as such. Genuine natural monuments amount to a few very old oaktrees and the Jakobstanne on the Wartenberg, a mighty Douglas-fir.

=== Sport ===
Rhaunen has a sport club, “TUS” Rhaunen, with various departments. Nationally known is the IVV hike in the spring.

=== Regular events ===
- Rhauner Herbstmarkt (Autumn Market), first Saturday in October
- Weihnachtsmarkt (Christmas Market), December

The event Päädscher Laafe (or in High German, Pfade laufen – “Walk paths”) is a kind of “open house” day in the municipality, on which people can get a glimpse into places that are not otherwise open to the public. At the same time, it gives businesses and other institutions an opportunity to present themselves from a different angle.

=== Culinary specialities ===
These include Spießbraten (spit roast), Schaukelbraten (“swung” roast), Gefüllte Klöße (filled dumplings), Reibekuchen (potato pancake) and Schaales (another kind of potato pancake).

== Economy and infrastructure ==
=== Service sector ===
Rhaunen offers the surrounding area many services, including physicians, authorities, churches, schools, workshops, filling stations and shops for daily and occasional needs, which can all be found in the village. There are, however, no businesses in the industrial sector.

=== Transport ===
Serving Rhaunen are bus routes 345, 351 and 352, run by Omnibusverkehr Rhein-Nahe (ORN). There are stops at Rhaunen Markt, the church, the Verbandsgemeinde administration building and the outdoor swimming pool. Route 345 runs from Idar-Oberstein railway station by way of Tiefenstein (a constituent community of Idar-Oberstein), Asbach and Stipshausen to Rhaunen Markt. Routes 351 and 352 run as links to Frankfurt-Hahn Airport, with 351 coming from Idar-Oberstein station and 352 from Kirn station.

Idar-Oberstein's railway station, as a Regional-Express and Regionalbahn stop, is linked by way of the Nahe Valley Railway (Bingen–Saarbrücken) to the Saarland and the Frankfurt Rhine Main Region. The Rhein-Nahe-Express running the Mainz-Saarbrücken route serves the station hourly. Every other one of these trains goes through to the main railway station in Frankfurt with a stop at Frankfurt Airport. Formerly, fast trains on the Frankfurt-Paris route had a stop at Idar-Oberstein. Kirn station, too, is on the Nahe Valley Railway.

=== Public institutions ===
Rhaunen is seat of the Verbandsgemeinde administration and also the Idarwald (Idar Forest) forester's office, whose area of responsibility has grown considerably in the wake of reform to forest administration. On the other hand, the notary's office, which had been in Rhaunen for more than a century, was moved to Morbach in the course of structural reform in 2007. There are, however, still consultations in Rhaunen. Also in the municipality are two clergymen, one Evangelical and one Catholic.

=== Education ===
Rhaunen has two kindergartens, a primary school, a branch location of the Sohren regional school and a folk high school.

== Famous people ==
=== Sons and daughters of the town ===
- Sigbert Josef Maria Ganser (1853–1931), famous psychologist. Ganser syndrome was named after him.
- Albert Kahn (1869–1942), one of the most important industrial architects in modern times; emigrated to the United States
- Walter Dix (1879–1965), plant cultivation scientist
- Otto Conrad (1890–1968), teacher, photographer and local historian (“Vom Hunsrück zur Nahe”)
- Gerd Heinz-Mohr (1913–1989), Evangelical theologian and writer, earned a doctorate in social studies of Nicholas of Cusa (“Unitas Christiana”)
- Erwin Echternacht (b. 7 September 1925 - 2012), lives in Munich, sculptor, graphic artist, painter and writer, Staatliche Bildhauerschule, Landeskunstschule Mainz, Academy of Fine Arts, Munich, master's pupil with diploma, academic and competition prizes, exhibitions in Germany and abroad

=== Famous people associated with the municipality ===
- Julius Bellinger (1831–?), German politician of the German Centre Party and Member of the Reichstag, was from 1867 to 1869 a justice of the peace in Rhaunen
- Albin Edelhoff (1887–1974), painter and Friend of Nature
- Peter Joseph Rottmann (1799–1881), important Hunsrück dialectal poet, married Wilhelmine Maull from Rhaunen
