= Weitersbach =

- Municipality
- Coat of arms

- Location of Weitersbach within Birkenfeld district
- Interactive map of Weitersbach
- Location within Germany Location within Rhineland-Palatinate
- Coordinates: 49°52′26″N 7°19′3″E
- Country: Germany
- State: Rhineland-Palatinate
- District: Birkenfeld
- Municipal assoc.: Herrstein-Rhaunen

Government
  - Mayor (2019–24): Marco Ripp

Area
  - Total: 7.75 km^{2} (2.99 sq mi)
- Elevation: 405 m (1,329 ft)

Population (2025-12-31)
  - Total: 86
  - Density: 11/km^{2} (29/sq mi)
- Time zone: UTC+01:00 (CET)
  - Summer (DST): UTC+02:00 (CEST)
- Postal codes: 55624
- Dialling codes: 06544
- Vehicle registration: BIR

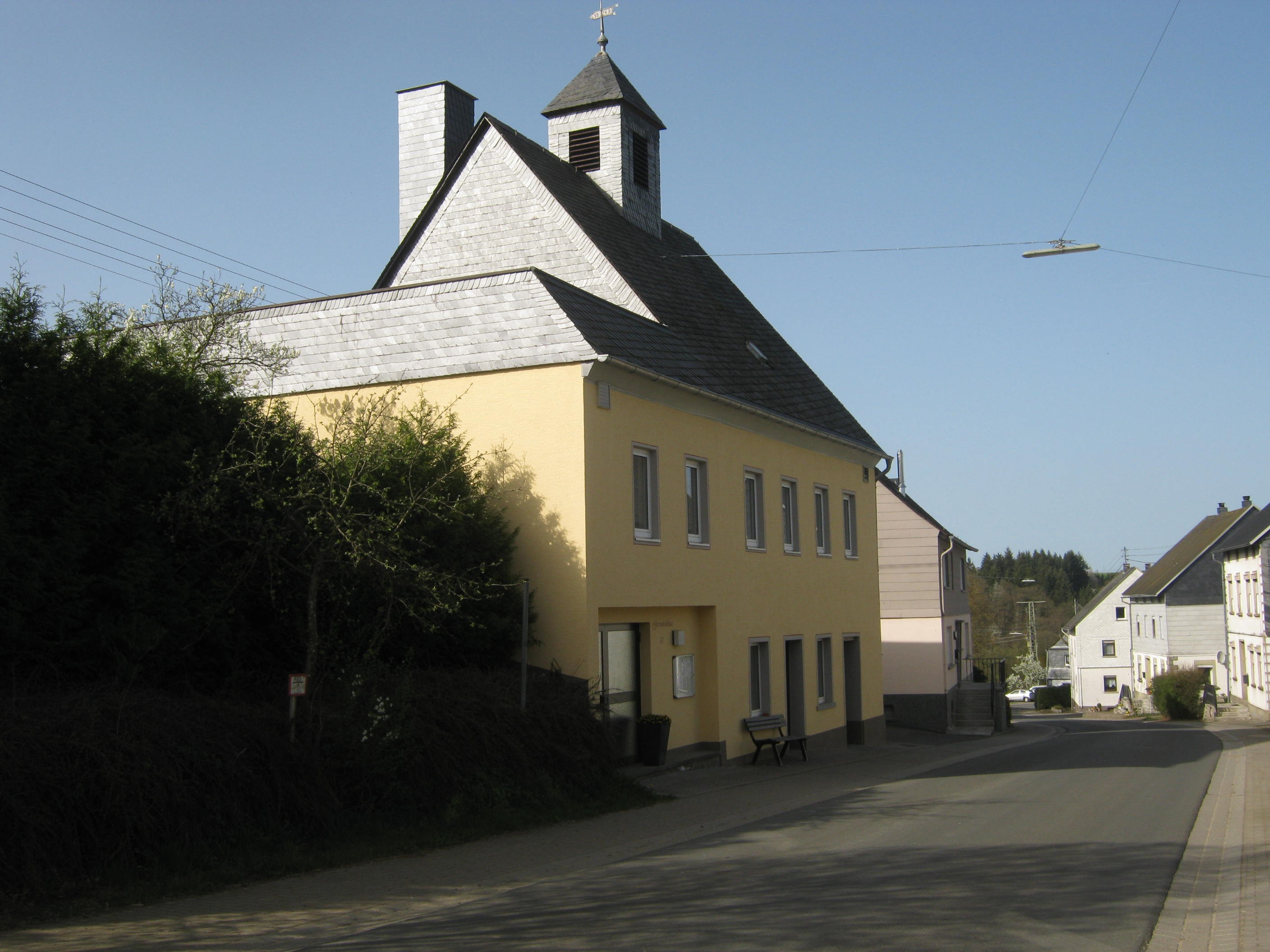
Municipal centre

Weitersbach is an Ortsgemeinde – a municipality belonging to a Verbandsgemeinde, a kind of collective municipality – in the Birkenfeld district in Rhineland-Palatinate, Germany. It belongs to the Verbandsgemeinde Herrstein-Rhaunen, whose seat is in Herrstein.

== Geography ==
=== Location ===
The municipality lies on the Idarbach at the edge of the Idar Forest in the Hunsrück. The municipal area is 77.2% wooded.

=== Neighbouring municipalities ===
Weitersbach borders in the north on the municipality of Laufersweiler (Rhein-Hunsrück-Kreis), in the northeast on the municipality of Gösenroth, in the southeast on the municipality of Rhaunen, in the southwest on the municipality of Stipshausen, in the west on the municipalities of Hochscheid (Bernkastel-Wittlich district) and Horbruch and in the northwest on the municipality of Krummenau.

== History ==
Archaeological digs at several barrows within Weitersbach's limits have unearthed finely decorated ceramics, bronze weapons and pieces of jewellery. These are grave goods from the prevalent culture about the year 500 BC, when Celtic settlers of Early La Tène times used the favourable location on the Idarkopf's south slope as their dwelling and farming place. Finds of metal-bearing slag in the forest above the village also suggest that iron was being smelted here even in pre-Roman times.

Just under 2,000 years ago, at the grove known as the Kaisergarten, where the forest road to Krummenau and the ancient trade road “Strut” fork away from each other, stood one of the biggest estates of Roman times in the Hunsrück area. Among the buildings here, which were thoroughly excavated in 1953-1955, was the main building, a palacelike villa with a risalto, an ostentatious portico and corner turrets. This 26-room villa rustica had floor heating by hypocaust and a luxurious bathing wing with cold, lukewarm and hot baths. Near the main building stood drying ovens for grain and smoked foods: a clear hint that there were both extensive cropraising and significant livestock raising here.

In 1200, Weitersbach had its first documentary mention as Widemarsbach.

== Politics ==
=== Municipal council ===
The council is made up of 6 council members, who were elected by majority vote at the municipal election held on 7 June 2009, and the honorary mayor as chairman.

=== Mayor ===
Weitersbach's mayor is Marco Ripp.

=== Coat of arms ===
The German blazon reads: In geteiltem Schild oben in Gold ein rotes Fabeltier mit einem Wolfskopf und weit geöffneten Schwingen, belegt mit einem schwarzen Wolfshaken. Unten in Grün eine silberne Korndarre, begleitet von zwei goldenen Ähren.

The municipality's arms might in English heraldic language be described thus: Per fess Or a monster with a wolf's head and an eagle's body sans talons displayed gules, its breast charged with a cramp sable, and vert a corn oast argent issuant from which two ears of wheat, the dexter bendwise and the sinister bendwise sinister, both of the first.

The charge above the line of partition is a reference to the village's former allegiance to the Waldgraviate-Rhinegraviate and indeed is the heraldic device once used in the Waldgravial-Rhinegravial court seal at Rhaunen. The ears of wheat below refer to the village's agricultural structure. The corn oast is an archaeological artefact from the land of the Treveri (a people of mixed Celtic and Germanic stock, from whom the Latin name for the city of Trier, Augusta Treverorum, is also derived) that came from the old Roman villa rustica in Weitersbach. The find is now kept at the Landesmuseum Trier.

== Culture and sightseeing ==
=== Buildings ===
The following are listed buildings or sites in Rhineland-Palatinate’s Directory of Cultural Monuments:

- Kaisergarten (“Emperor’s Garden”), southwest of the village: eight beeches and one oak, after 1871

== Economy and infrastructure ==
Krummenau has a village community centre. Serving nearby Idar-Oberstein is a railway station, which as a Regional-Express and Regionalbahn stop, is linked by way of the Nahe Valley Railway (Bingen–Saarbrücken) to the Saarland and the Frankfurt Rhine Main Region. The Rhein-Nahe-Express running the Mainz-Saarbrücken route serves the station hourly. Every other train goes through to the main railway station in Frankfurt with a stop at Frankfurt Airport. Formerly, fast trains on the Frankfurt-Paris route had a stop at Idar-Oberstein.

To the north lie Bundesstraße 50 and Frankfurt-Hahn Airport.
