= Bollenbach =

- Municipality
- Coat of arms

- Location of Bollenbach within Birkenfeld district
- Interactive map of Bollenbach
- Location within Germany Location within Rhineland-Palatinate
- Coordinates: 49°50′31.29″N 7°21′8.39″E
- Country: Germany
- State: Rhineland-Palatinate
- District: Birkenfeld
- Municipal assoc.: Herrstein-Rhaunen

Government
  - Mayor (2019–24): Timo Dönig

Area
  - Total: 3.77 km^{2} (1.46 sq mi)
- Elevation: 410 m (1,350 ft)

Population (2025-12-31)
  - Total: 131
  - Density: 34.7/km^{2} (90.0/sq mi)
- Time zone: UTC+01:00 (CET)
  - Summer (DST): UTC+02:00 (CEST)
- Postal codes: 55624
- Dialling codes: 06544
- Vehicle registration: BIR

Bollenbach is an Ortsgemeinde – a municipality belonging to a Verbandsgemeinde, a kind of collective municipality – in the Birkenfeld district in Rhineland-Palatinate, Germany. It belongs to the Verbandsgemeinde Herrstein-Rhaunen, whose seat is in Herrstein.

== Geography ==
This is full of green land spreading for over 57 miles. It has many block huts built forming small cities. It is nearly abandoned.

=== Location ===
The municipality lies in the Hunsrück, east of the Idar Forest.

=== Neighbouring municipalities ===
Bollenbach borders in the north on Rhaunen, in the east on Bundenbach and in the southwest on Sulzbach.

== History ==
In the Middle Ages, Bollenbach was made up of two parts, the Hochgericht (“High Court”) and the Ingericht, which belonged respectively to the two lordly houses of Schmidtburg and Wildenburg. The “boundary” between these two parts of the village is unaccountably still visible today as a bare strip on which nothing has been built, running through the middle of the village.

The villagers earned their livelihood not only from farming small plots, but also, as late as the 1960s, by mining slate at six pits.

Within Bollenbach's limits lie several former villages, now in sparse ruins. These were wiped out either by massacres in the Thirty Years' War or by the Plague shortly thereafter, and were never repopulated.

Until administrative restructuring in Rhineland-Palatinate in 1969, Bollenbach belonged to the now abolished Bernkastel district.

== Politics ==
=== Municipal council ===
The council is made up of 6 council members, who were elected by majority vote at the municipal election held on 7 June 2009, and the honorary mayor as chairman.

=== Mayor ===
Bollenbach's mayor is Timo Dönig.

=== Coat of arms ===
The German blazon reads: In geteiltem Schild oben in Gold ein rotes Fabeltier mit einem Wolfskopf und weit geöffneten Schwingen belegt mit einem schwarzen Wolfshaken. Unten in Grün drei Bäume.

The municipality's arms might in English heraldic language be described thus: Per fess Or a beast with a wolf's head and an eagle's body displayed gules, its breast surmounted by a crampon palewise sable, and vert three trees of the first.

The German blazon does not mention what tincture the trees are to be shown in; the English rendering uses the one – Or, or gold – shown in the image accompanying this article. Nor does the German blazon mention what kind of trees must be shown.

The upper field is a reference to the village's former allegiance to the “Wild and Rhine” County (ruled by the Waldgraves and Rhinegraves) and shows the court seal used by those counts’ high court at Rhaunen. The three trees symbolize the municipality's wealth of woodland. The Viergemeindewald (the parochial forest) was mentioned as early as 29 August 1680.

== Culture and sightseeing ==
=== Buildings ===
The following are listed buildings or sites in Rhineland-Palatinate’s Directory of Cultural Monuments:

- Evangelical church, Hauptstraße 18 – aisleless church with ridge turret, marked 1719
- Hauptstraße 12 – scattered estate; timber-frame house, plastered and sided, marked 1766 (possibly with spolia), conversion about 1860, timber-frame commercial building about 1860
- Mühlenweg 1 – Gemeinschaftsmühle (“Community Mill”); plain timber-frame building, technical equipment, 1926

The Gemeinschaftsmühle had one of the first electric gristmills in the Hunsrück.

=== Natural monuments ===
The 500-year-old Dicke Eiche (“Fat Oak”) is protected as a natural monument.

== Economy and infrastructure ==
Bollenbach has a village community centre.

=== Transport ===
Available in nearby Kirn is a railway station on the Nahe Valley Railway (Bingen–Saarbrücken). To the north lie Bundesstraße 50 and Frankfurt-Hahn Airport.
