= Bundenbach =

- Municipality
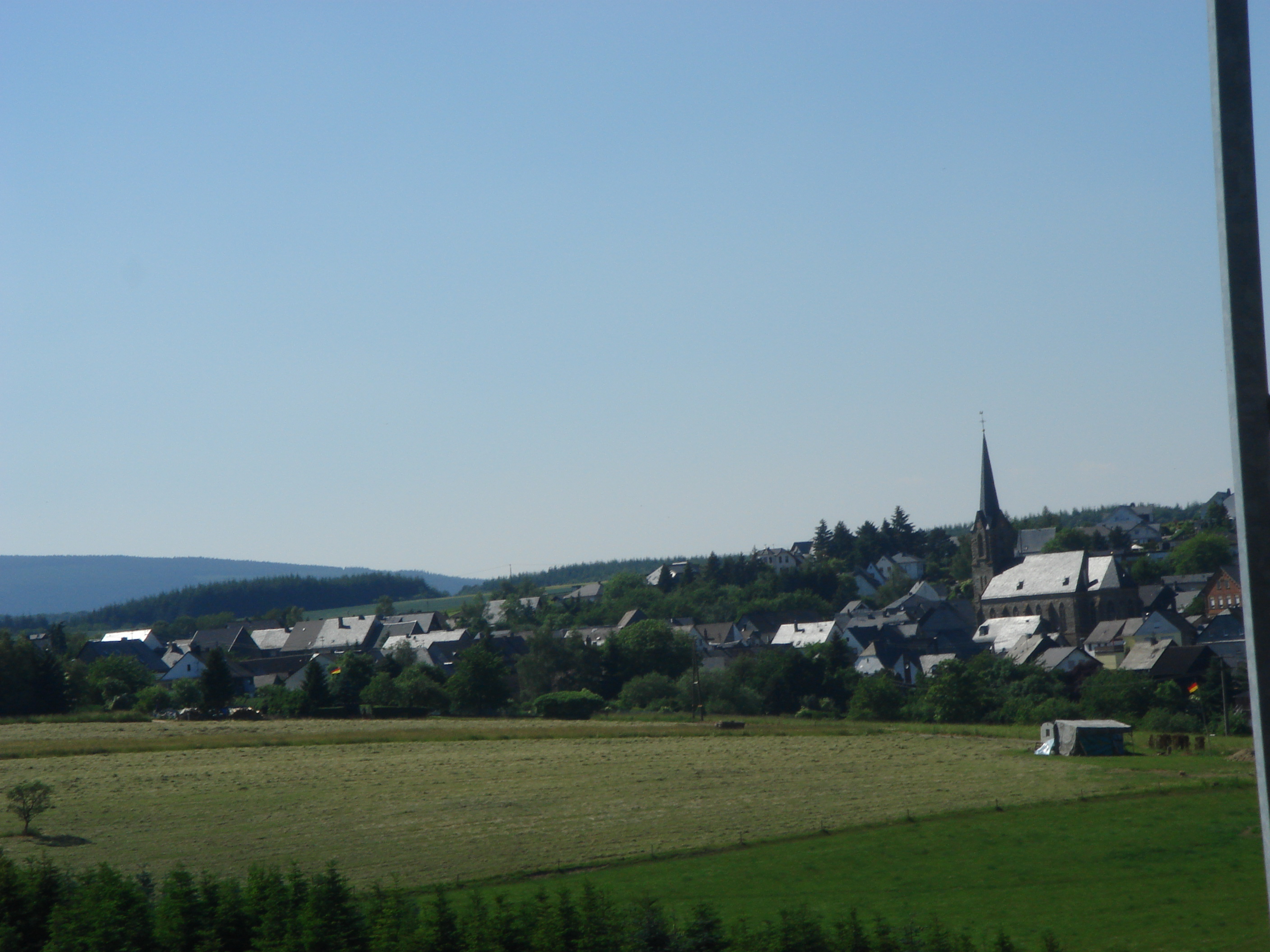

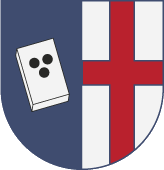
- Coat of arms

- Location of Bundenbach within Birkenfeld district
- Interactive map of Bundenbach
- Location within Germany Location within Rhineland-Palatinate
- Coordinates: 49°50′34″N 7°22′43″E
- Country: Germany
- State: Rhineland-Palatinate
- District: Birkenfeld
- Municipal assoc.: Herrstein-Rhaunen

Government
  - Mayor (2019–24): Verena Mächtel

Area
  - Total: 7.70 km^{2} (2.97 sq mi)
- Elevation: 400 m (1,300 ft)

Population (2025-12-31)
  - Total: 884
  - Density: 115/km^{2} (297/sq mi)
- Time zone: UTC+01:00 (CET)
  - Summer (DST): UTC+02:00 (CEST)
- Postal codes: 55626
- Dialling codes: 06544
- Vehicle registration: BIR
- Website: www.bundenbach.de

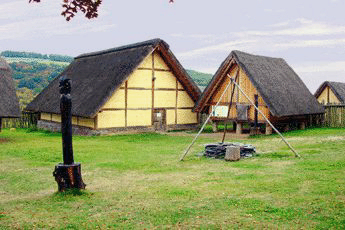
Reconstructed Celtic heights settlement

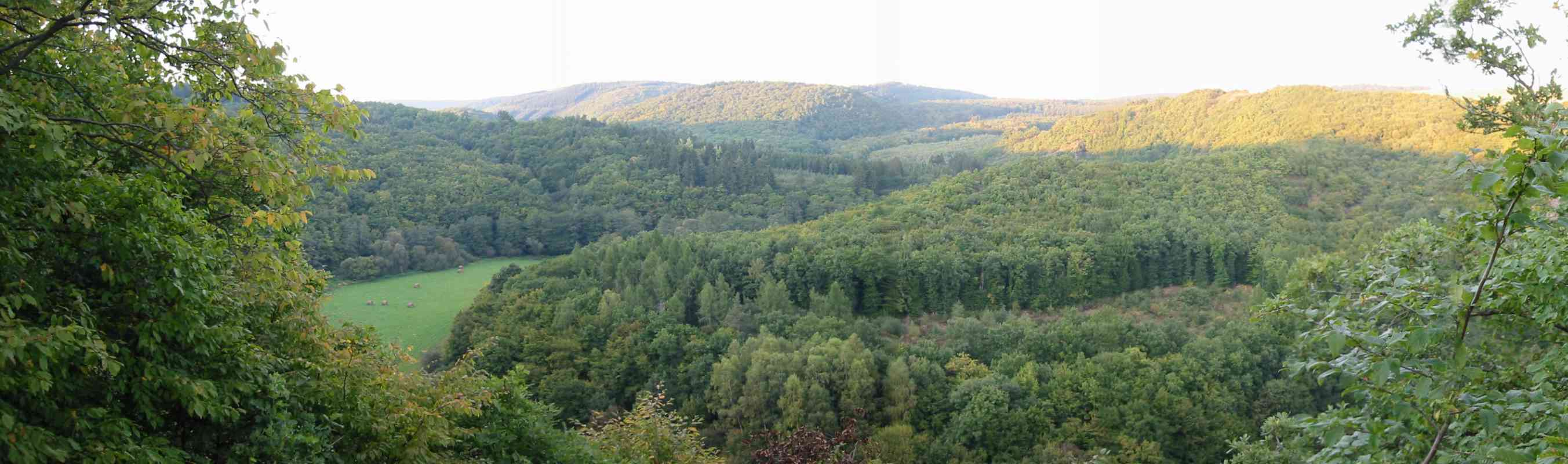
Hahnenbach valley

Bundenbach is an Ortsgemeinde – a municipality belonging to a Verbandsgemeinde, a kind of collective municipality – in the Birkenfeld district of Rhineland-Palatinate, Germany. It belongs to the Verbandsgemeinde Herrstein-Rhaunen, whose seat is in Herrstein.

For its roughly 400-million-year-old fossils of Placodermi and other creatures from the Devonian, Bundenbach is said to be a world-class fossil Lagerstätte.

== Geography ==
=== Location ===
The municipality lies on the Hunsrück Schiefer- und Burgenstraße (“Hunsrück Slate and Castle Road”).

=== Neighbouring municipalities ===
The nearest major towns are Kirn, Idar-Oberstein and Simmern. Neighbouring municipalities are Rhaunen, Bollenbach, Schneppenbach and Bruschied.

=== Constituent communities ===
Also belonging to Bundenbach are the outlying homesteads of Neumühle and Reinhardsmühle.

== History ==
The area was settled in protohistory, which is proven by digs undertaken by the Rheinisches Landesmuseum Trier (Trier Rhenish State Museum) from 1971 to 1974 at the Altburg (“Old Castle”) on a mountain spur near Bundenbach, inside a bow in the tributary Hahnenbach. Standing there from about 170 to 50 BC was a Late Iron Age, Late Celtic fortification complex, or castellum, of the Treveri, a people of mixed Celtic and Germanic stock, from whom the Latin name for the city of Trier, Augusta Treverorum, is also derived. This hill castle was first laid out as a lightly fortified settlement on the heights and only later given strong walls. The last traces of human presence there vanished in the mid 1st century BC. It is said to be the most thoroughly explored complex of its kind.

As a result of the exploratory digs, the Altburg has been partly restored to its form in the 1st century BC, and has been expanded into a unique, protohistoric open-air museum. The Freilichtmuseum Altburg was dedicated and opened to the public in 1988.

Bundenbach's founding may be placed in the earlier half of the 10th century. It had its first documentary mention, though, in a Waldgravial partition document on 14 March 1283. The Waldgraves had the forest cleared and thereby gained freehold land for themselves. This was named Beunde. The settlement on the Beunde, which also lay on a brook (Bach in German), thereby got its name: Bundenbach.

Mentioned much nearer the presumed founding date, however, was the Schmidtburg, the Waldgraves’ ancestral seat in the Hahnenbach valley. This first cropped up in history in 1084. Bundenbach was always bound to the Schmidtburg, even after the childless Waldgrave Heinrich von der Schmidtburg enfeoffed Archbishop and Elector of Trier Baldwin in 1324 with the Schmidtburg and the villages belonging to it. From 1330 to 1794, Bundenbach belonged to the Electoral-Trier Amt of Schmidtburg.

The Schmidtburg, which actually lies within Schneppenbach’s limits, was thoroughly repaired between 1981 and 1987. It is among the Hunsrück’s oldest castles.

Politically, after the Amt of Schmidtburg was dissolved and after its short time in the French canton of Rhaunen in Napoleonic times, from 1817 to 1937 Bundenbach was part of the Grand Duchy and Free State of Oldenburg, and more locally to the Principality (later Province) of Birkenfeld. In the course of administrative restructuring in Rhineland-Palatinate, Bundenbach passed from the Amt of Herrstein to the Verbandsgemeinde Herrstein-Rhaunen in the Birkenfeld district (and also in the Regierungsbezirk of Koblenz, although Rhineland-Palatinate abolished Regierungsbezirke in 1999) in 1970.

Bundenbach is known internationally for its slate mining and important fossil finds. The use of slate in the Bundenbach area has a demonstrably long history: the Celtic hill castle’s defensive wall was built of slate quarrystones. The first slate mining lease agreement is witnessed on Saint Walpurga’s Day 1519: The Lords of Wiltberg leased their “Laienkaul unden an Prorschitt uff der Bach gelegen” (“Laienkaul down below at Bruschied, lying on the brook”) for four years to, among others, the two Bundenbach residents Peter and Niklas Huppen.

In 1865 21 slate mines still existed within Bundenbach's limits. In 2000, open-cast slate mining came to an end at Bundenbach's last slate pit. Since then, only slates delivered from elsewhere have been worked.

Another mine, the Herrenberg slate pit near the Altburg and opposite the Schmidtburg, first mentioned in 1822, ceased operations in 1964. Eleven years later, a private initiative by Bundenbach residents was begun to open this mine as a tourist attraction. It was dedicated and opened to the public in 1976. It was later expanded with the addition of a fossil museum that displays noteworthy pieces along with old photographs and equipment.

== Politics ==
=== Municipal council ===
The council is made up of 12 council members, who were elected by proportional representation at the municipal election held on 7 June 2009, and the honorary mayor as chairman.

The municipal election held on 7 June 2009 yielded the following results:

Year	CDU	WGR	Total
2009	5	7	12 seats
2004	9	7	16 seats

=== Mayor ===
Bundenbach's mayor is Verena Mächtel.

=== Coat of arms ===
The German blazon reads: In gespaltenem Schild vorne in Blau ein mit drei schwarzen Kugeln belegtes silbernes Buch schräg, hinten in Silber ein rotes Balkenkreuz.

The municipality's arms might in English heraldic language be described thus: Per pale azure a book bendwise argent charged with three roundels sable and argent a cross gules.

The charge on the dexter (armsbearer's right, viewer's left) side is Saint Nicholas’s attribute, thus representing the municipality’s and the church’s patron saint. He was also depicted in the old court seal. The red cross on the sinister (armsbearer’s left, viewer’s right) side is a reference to the village’s former allegiance to the Electorate of Trier.

== Culture and sightseeing ==
=== Buildings ===
The following are listed buildings or sites in Rhineland-Palatinate’s Directory of Cultural Monuments:

- Saint Nicholas’s Catholic Parish Church (Pfarrkirche St. Nikolaus), Hauptstraße – Gothic Revival slate quarrystone building, 1907-1909, architect Johann Adam Rüppel, Bonn; décor
- Burgweg, graveyard – sandstone Crucifix, possibly from 1785
- Burgweg 1 – schoolhouse; solid building, partly timber-frame (slated), 1823; characterizes village’s appearance
- Burgweg 8 – former rectory; brick building with sandstone framing, 1880
- Hauptstraße – sandstone cross, cast-iron Crucifix, mid 19th century
- Hauptstraße 21 – stately house, hipped mansard roof, Baroque Revival and Art Nouveau motifs, 1828
- Theresienkapelle (“Saint Teresa’s Chapel”), northwest of the village – building with gable roof, 1948

=== Other sites ===
Worth seeing are the mediaeval castle ruin, the Schmidtburg (the biggest Rhenish castle complex), the Herrenberg slate pit (since 1976 open to visitors as an attraction), the fossil museum, the Altburg Celtic heights settlement from La Tène times and the Hahnenbach valley, which has no road traffic.

== Economy and infrastructure ==
=== Transport ===
In Kirn is the nearest railway station. It lies on the Nahe Valley Railway (Bingen–Saarbrücken). To the north are Bundesstraße 50 and Frankfurt-Hahn Airport.

=== Public institutions ===
Bundenbach has one kindergarten and a village community centre.

== Famous people ==
=== Sons and daughters of the town ===
- Wendel Schäfer (b. 1940), teacher and writer
