= Gösenroth =

- Municipality
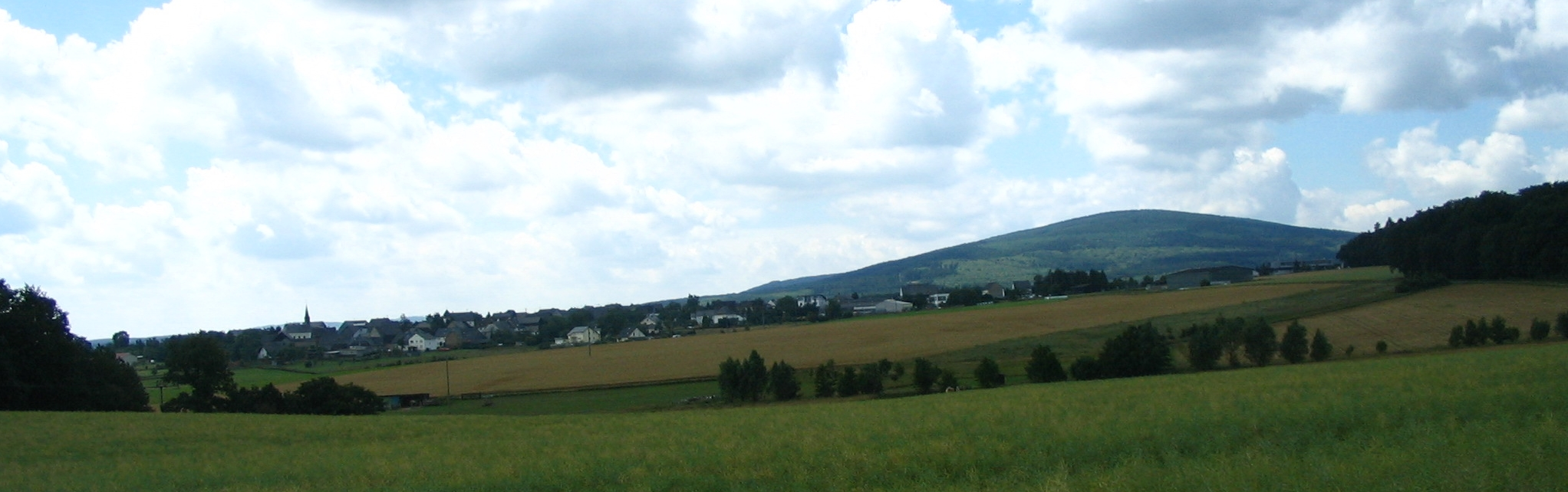

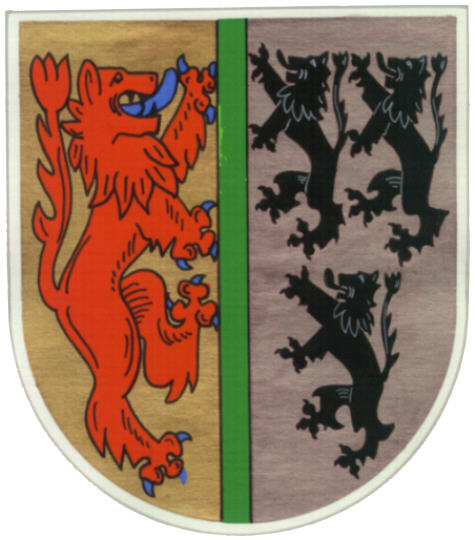
- Coat of arms

- Location of Gösenroth within Birkenfeld district
- Interactive map of Gösenroth
- Location within Germany Location within Rhineland-Palatinate
- Coordinates: 49°53′22.69″N 7°19′32.46″E
- Country: Germany
- State: Rhineland-Palatinate
- District: Birkenfeld
- Municipal assoc.: Herrstein-Rhaunen

Government
  - Mayor (2019–24): Albert Echternacht

Area
  - Total: 4.49 km^{2} (1.73 sq mi)
- Elevation: 430 m (1,410 ft)

Population (2025-12-31)
  - Total: 239
  - Density: 53.2/km^{2} (138/sq mi)
- Time zone: UTC+01:00 (CET)
  - Summer (DST): UTC+02:00 (CEST)
- Postal codes: 55624
- Dialling codes: 06544
- Vehicle registration: BIR

Gösenroth is an Ortsgemeinde – a municipality belonging to a Verbandsgemeinde, a kind of collective municipality – in the Birkenfeld district in Rhineland-Palatinate, Germany. It belongs to the Verbandsgemeinde Herrstein-Rhaunen, whose seat is in Herrstein.

== Geography ==
=== Location ===
The municipality lies in the Hunsrück, east of the Idar Forest. To its east is the Kyrbach valley.

Gösenroth is a linear village (by some definitions of the word, a thorpe).

=== Neighbouring municipalities ===
Gösenroth's neighbours are Laufersweiler, Schwerbach, Rhaunen and Weitersbach. All but Laufersweiler, which lies in the Rhein-Hunsrück-Kreis, lie within the Birkenfeld district.

== History ==
The oldest archaeological finds that yield evidence of settlement within what are now Gösenroth's limits come from the first and early second century AD. These finds were made in 1936 by the Landesmuseum Trier (Trier State Museum) on the road between Gösenroth and Schwerbach (bordering on Laufersweiler). While some woods were being cleared, seven barrows were discovered. Unearthed by digs at these barrows were, among other things, an iron hatchet, several amphorae, pots, urns, a spindle whorl, a pair of fibulae, two coins (one with Emperor Nero’s effigy from sometime between AD 64 and 68) and a bronze armband. In the latest of these graves (2nd century AD), an iron stylus was found. It was also believed that some of the finds were from an abode of some kind.

In the local speech, Gösenroth is known as Gesad, and indeed, over time, the name has undergone shifts from Gossenroth to Goesenrat, Goisenrait, Gossenrait, and finally Gösenroth. About the name’s meaning there is only speculation. The ending —roth is of Frankish origin and points to a foundation about the turn of the second millennium as a clearing (Rodung in German) in the forest.

On 5 May 1367, the Lords of Senheim were mentioned as the village’s lords. On 14 June 1464, Wilhelm, Vogt of Senheim and his sister Eva von Senheim, who was married to Werner von Löwenstein, ceded the village of Goisenrait to the Waldgraves and Rhinegraves.

On the old track between Rhaunen and Hochscheid (in the cadastral area known as Gonsenbach), remnants of a long-vanished village could still be made out as late as 1938. According to oral history, this village’s name was Batzenroth, it had 16 houses, and in 1642 it burnt down. Not long thereafter, it was stricken by the Plague.

The oldest building still standing in the municipality is the estate of Giehl, built by Rhinegrave Ludwig Wilhelm in 1654. The so-called Fußmühle ("Foot Mill"), which in the last few years has been restored and is now fully functional, once belonged to Castle Dill. The basic material of today's building may go back to 1830. The Evangelical church was built in 1844 and 1845 on the site where once stood a smaller chapel, and was consecrated in 1848.

== Religion ==
Roughly 176 Gösenrothers form the Gösenroth Evangelical parish, which is parochially bound with Büchenbeuren. It belongs to the Simmern-Trarbach church district.

== Politics ==
=== Municipal council ===
The council is made up of 6 council members, who were elected by majority vote at the municipal election held on 7 June 2009, and the honorary mayor as chairman.

=== Mayor ===
Gösenroth's mayor is Albert Echternacht.

=== Coat of arms ===
The German blazon reads: In durch grünen Stab gespaltenem Schild vorne in Gold ein blaubewehrter und -gezungter roter Löwe nach links, hinten in Silber drei (2:1) schwarze Löwen.

The municipality's arms might in English heraldic language be described thus: An endorse vert between Or a lion rampant sinister gules armed and langued azure, and argent three lions rampant sable.

The charge on the dexter (armsbearer's right, viewer's left) side is a reference to the village's former allegiance to the Waldgraves and Rhinegraves. The three lions rampant on the sinister (armsbearer's left, viewer's right) side are the arms formerly borne by the Lords of Senheim. As mentioned above, the latter ceded the village to the former on 14 June 1464. The endorse (vertical stripe, much thinner than a pale) was chosen to stand for the municipality's agricultural structure, symbolized in the endorse's tincture, vert (green).

== Culture and sightseeing ==
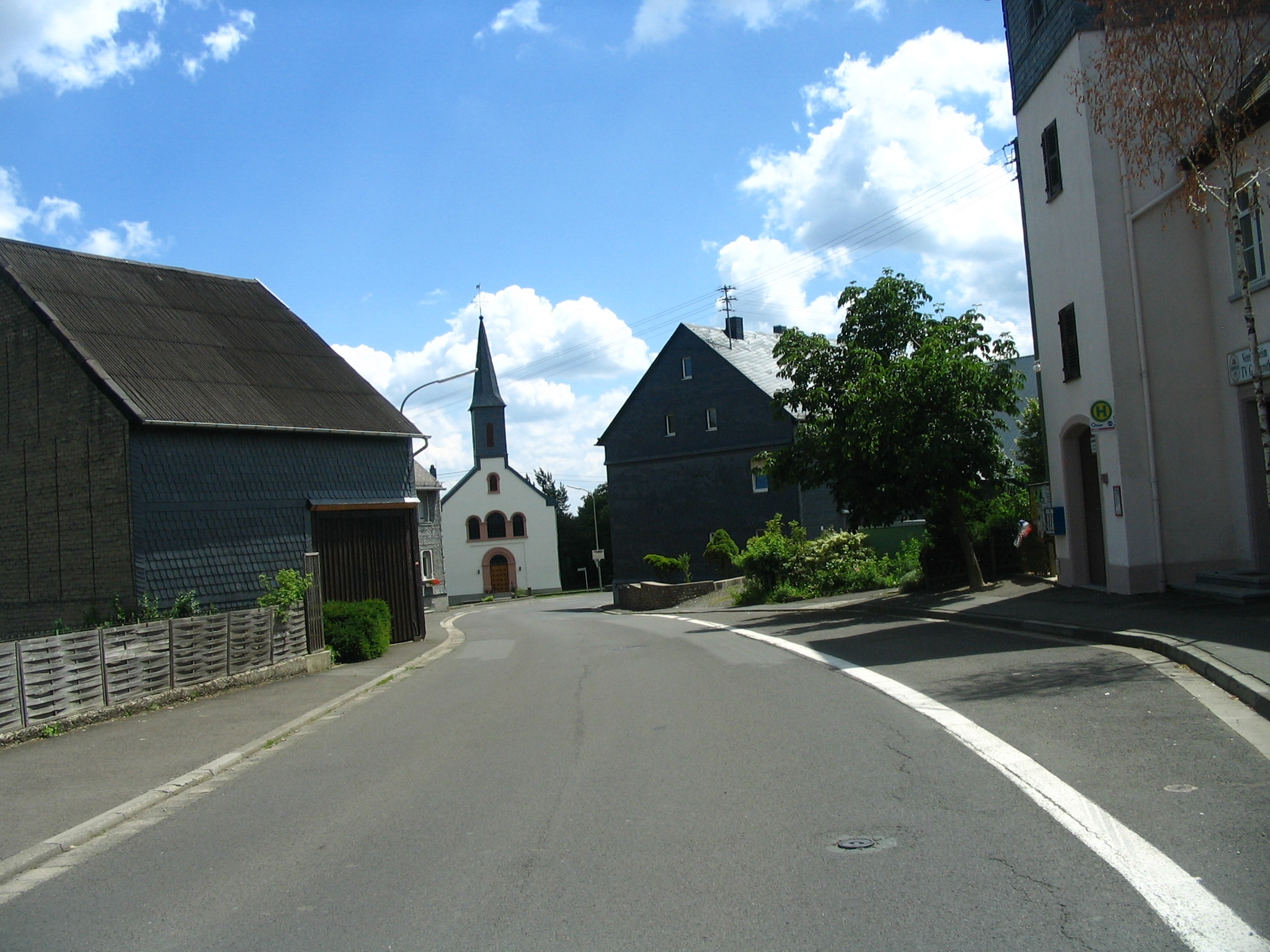
Kirchstraße 2: Evangelical church

The following are listed buildings or sites in Rhineland-Palatinate’s Directory of Cultural Monuments:

- Evangelical church, Kirchstraße 2 – aisleless church with ridge turret, Classicist façade, 1844/1845
- Hauptstraße 5 – timber-frame house with knee wall, brick infill, late 19th century
- Unterdorf 7 – Scattered estate; stately timber-frame house, plastered, partly slated, half-hipped roof, 18th century; barn, partly timber-frame, possibly not as old
- So-called Fußmühle (“Foot Mill”), southwest of the village on the Idarbach – building with gable roof, before 1830; equipment

== Economy and infrastructure ==
The municipality has a community centre.

=== Transport ===
Available in nearby Kirn is a railway station on the Nahe Valley Railway (Bingen–Saarbrücken). To the north lie Bundesstraße 50 and Frankfurt-Hahn Airport.

Gösenroth has bus links to Traben-Trarbach, Kirn, Simmern, Frankfurt-Hahn Airport and Idar-Oberstein.

=== Education ===
A kindergarten, a primary school, a Realschule plus (a special kind of Realschule with Hauptschule components) and an integrated comprehensive school (Integrierte Gesamtschule Herrstein-Rhaunen) are all available to Gösenroth residents, but they are all in Rhaunen.
