= Knee wall =

Short wall used in timber roof construction

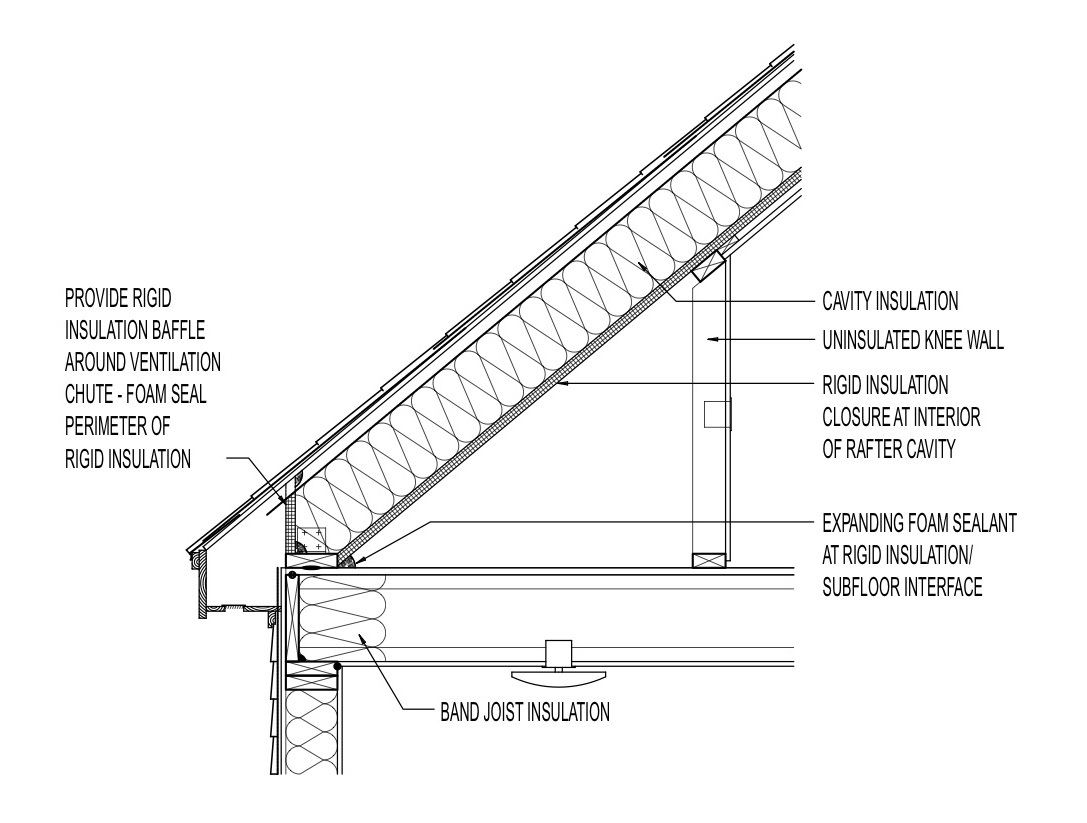
Diagram showing knee-wall used in timber roof construction which has no structural function

A knee wall is a short wall, typically under three feet (one metre) in height, used to support the rafters in timber roof construction. In his book A Visual Dictionary of Architecture, Francis D. K. Ching defines a knee wall as "a short wall supporting rafters at some intermediate position along their length." The knee wall provides support to the rafters which therefore need not be large enough to span from the ridge to the eaves. Typically the knee wall is covered with plaster or gypsum board.

The term is derived from the association with a human knee, partly bent. Knee walls are common in houses in which the ceiling on the top floor is an attic, i.e. the ceiling is the underside of the roof and slopes down on one or more sides.

== Jamb height ==
Since there is no legal definition of the jamb height, further specifications are required as to how it is to be measured. It is generally accepted that the knee wall begins at the upper edge of the soffit of the floor below. There is no uniform use of the term for the end of the knee stick. In the greatest extent of the knee wall, this extends to the imaginary intersection of the outer wall with the upper edge of the rafter. The smallest dimension is when the knee wall is understood to mean only the wall that goes beyond the attic ceiling (excluding the base purlin). Between these possibilities, other methods of measurement are in use.

== See also ==
- Sleeper wall – a short wall used to support floor joists of a ground floor
