= Schwerbach =

- Municipality
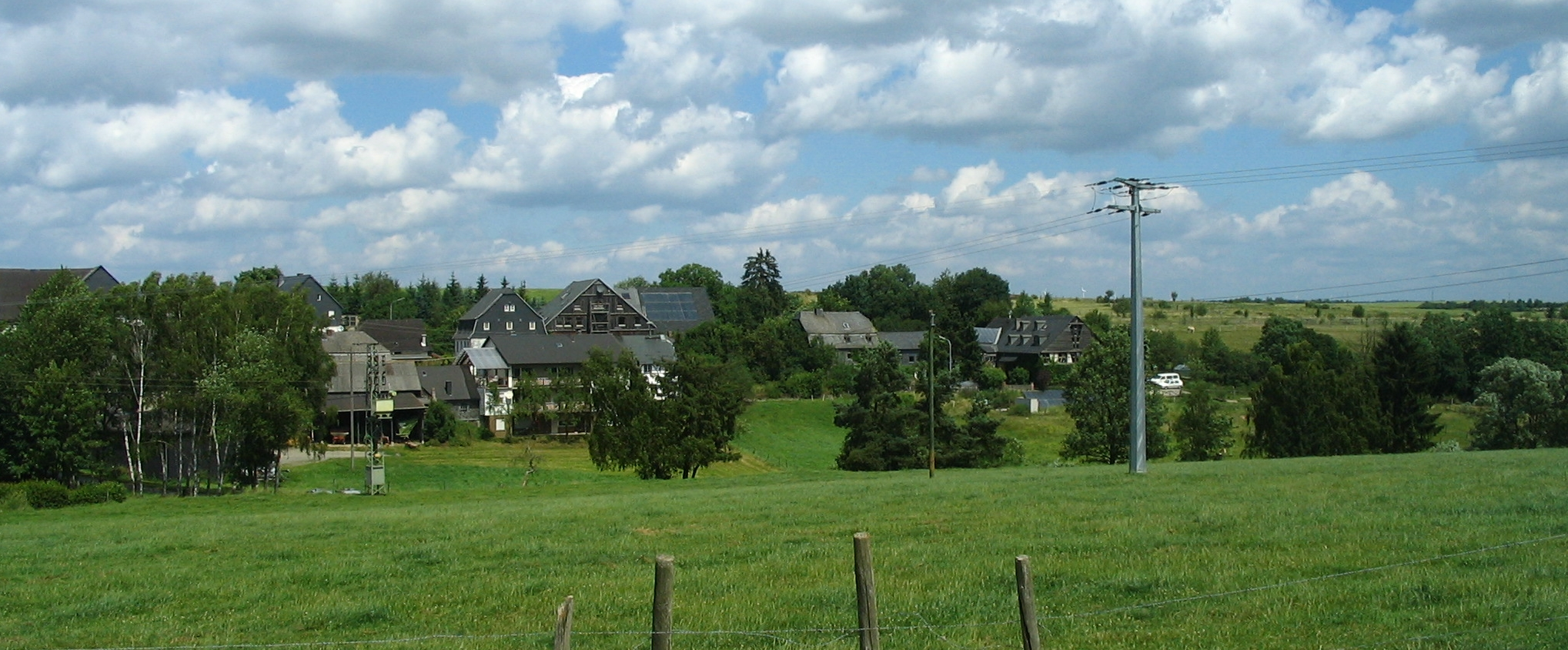
- View from the south

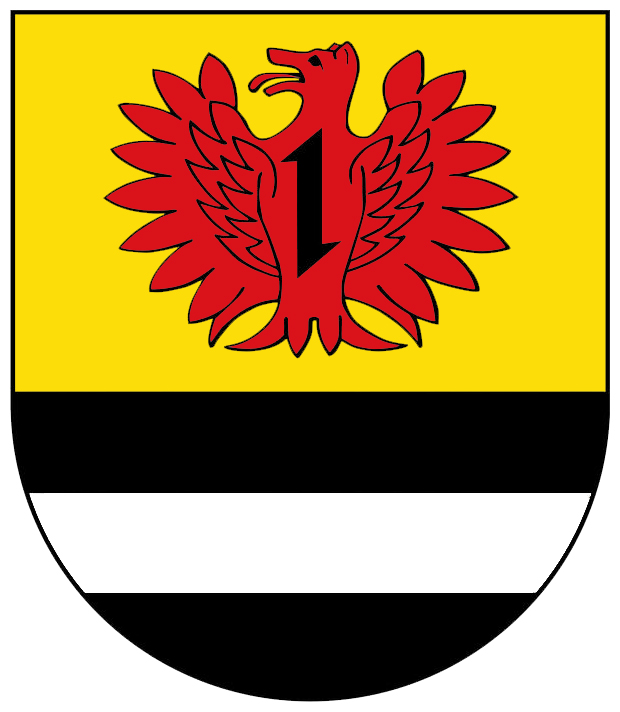
- Coat of arms

- Location of Schwerbach within Birkenfeld district
- Interactive map of Schwerbach
- Location within Germany Location within Rhineland-Palatinate
- Coordinates: 49°53′49″N 7°21′21″E
- Country: Germany
- State: Rhineland-Palatinate
- District: Birkenfeld
- Municipal assoc.: Herrstein-Rhaunen

Government
  - Mayor (2019–24): Claudia Endres

Area
  - Total: 2.55 km^{2} (0.98 sq mi)
- Elevation: 387 m (1,270 ft)

Population (2025-12-31)
  - Total: 51
  - Density: 20/km^{2} (52/sq mi)
- Time zone: UTC+01:00 (CET)
  - Summer (DST): UTC+02:00 (CEST)
- Postal codes: 55624
- Dialling codes: 06544
- Vehicle registration: BIR
- Website: www.schwerbach.de

Schwerbach is an Ortsgemeinde – a municipality belonging to a Verbandsgemeinde, a kind of collective municipality – in the Birkenfeld district in Rhineland-Palatinate, Germany. It belongs to the Verbandsgemeinde Herrstein-Rhaunen, whose seat is in Herrstein.

== Geography ==
The municipality, a clump village, lies in the central Hunsrück. Between the village and the Kyrbach valley lies the Wacholderheide (“Juniper Heath”) Conservation Area.

Schwerbach is the district's smallest municipality by population.

== History ==
In the Early Middle Ages, the Lords of Wiltberg had built a chapel in Schwerbach on the estate with which the Waldgraves were enfeoffed; it was consecrated on 15 July 1314. Schwerbach had “burial rights” at that time, which were always special rights.

In 1563, there were 12 hearths (for which read “households”) in Schwerbach.

== Politics ==
=== Municipal council ===
The council is made up of 6 council members, who were elected by majority vote at the municipal election held on 7 June 2009, and the honorary mayor as chairwoman.

=== Mayor ===
Schwerbach's mayor is Claudia Endres.

=== Coat of arms ===
The German blazon reads: In geteiltem Schild oben in Gold ein rotes Fabeltier mit einem Wolfskopf und weit geöffneten Schwingen, belegt mit einem schwarzen Wolfshaken. Unten in Schwarz ein silberner Balken.

The municipality's arms might in English heraldic language be described thus: Per fess Or a beast with a wolf's head and an eagle's body displayed gules, its breast surmounted by a crampon palewise sable, and sable a fess argent.

The upper field is a reference to the village's former allegiance to the “Wild and Rhine” County (ruled by the Waldgraves and Rhinegraves) and shows the court seal used by those counts’ high court at Rhaunen. The lower field shows the arms formerly borne by the Lords of Wiltberg, who were the lords at Schwerbach. In 1310, they had a chapel built at Schwerbach.

== Culture and sightseeing ==
The following are listed buildings or sites in Rhineland-Palatinate’s Directory of Cultural Monuments:

- At Dorfstraße 1 – in the commercial building a “three-naved” stable, about 1850/1860
- Dorfstraße 3 – house, partly timber-frame (slated), hipped mansard roof, about 1800

== Economy and infrastructure ==
Schwerbach has a village community centre.

=== Transport ===
Serving nearby Kirn is a railway station on the Nahe Valley Railway (Bingen–Saarbrücken). To the north lie Bundesstraße 50 and Frankfurt-Hahn Airport.
