= Herrstein =

- Municipality
- Coat of arms

- Location of Herrstein within Birkenfeld district
- Interactive map of Herrstein
- Location within Germany Location within Rhineland-Palatinate
- Coordinates: 49°46′46″N 07°20′19″E
- Country: Germany
- State: Rhineland-Palatinate
- District: Birkenfeld
- Municipal assoc.: Herrstein-Rhaunen

Government
  - Mayor (2019–24): Eberhard Weber

Area
  - Total: 4.81 km^{2} (1.86 sq mi)
- Elevation: 320 m (1,050 ft)

Population (2025-12-31)
  - Total: 780
  - Density: 160/km^{2} (420/sq mi)
- Time zone: UTC+01:00 (CET)
  - Summer (DST): UTC+02:00 (CEST)
- Postal codes: 55756
- Dialling codes: 06785
- Vehicle registration: BIR
- Website: www.vg-herrstein.de

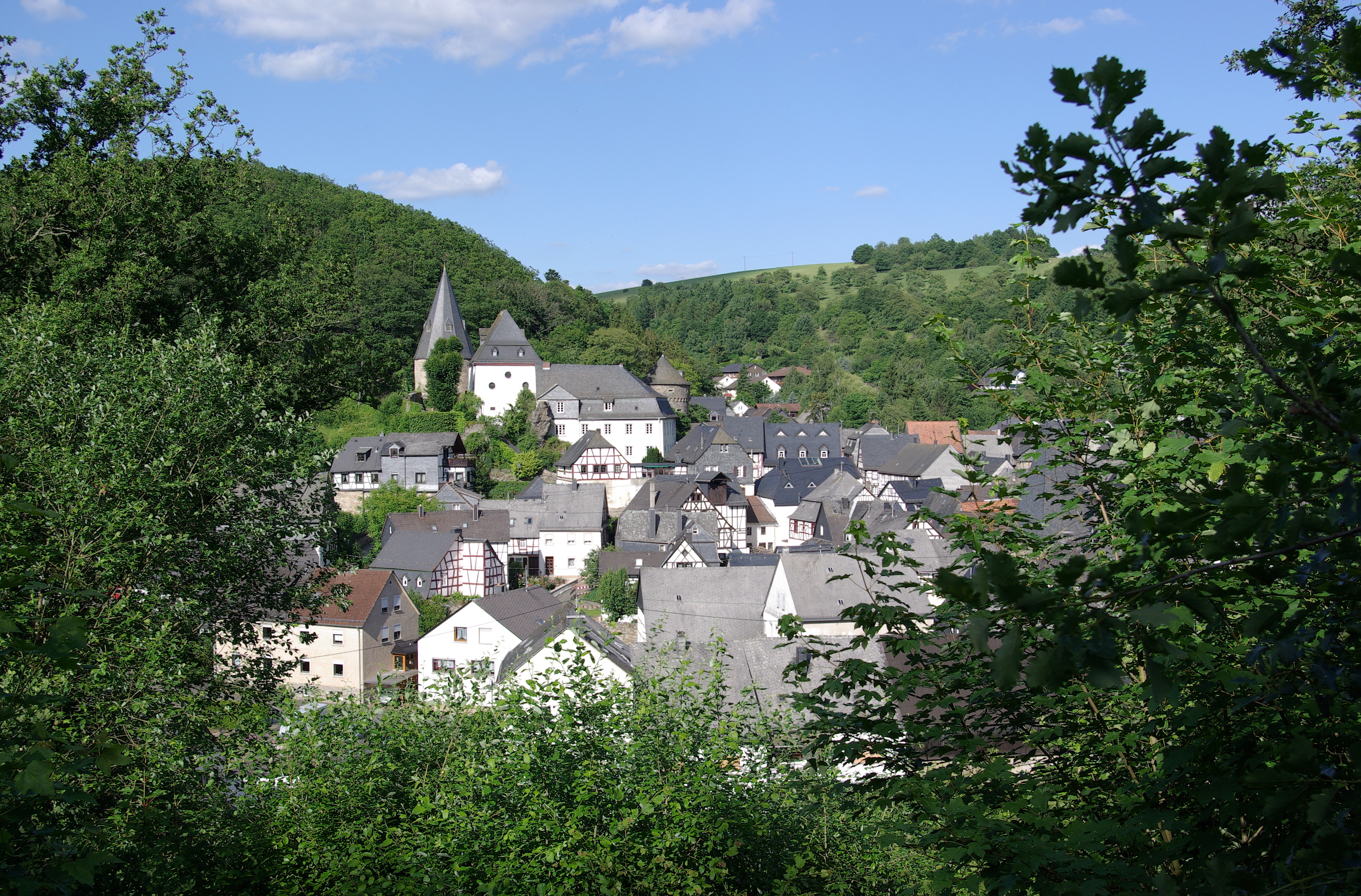
View of Herrstein

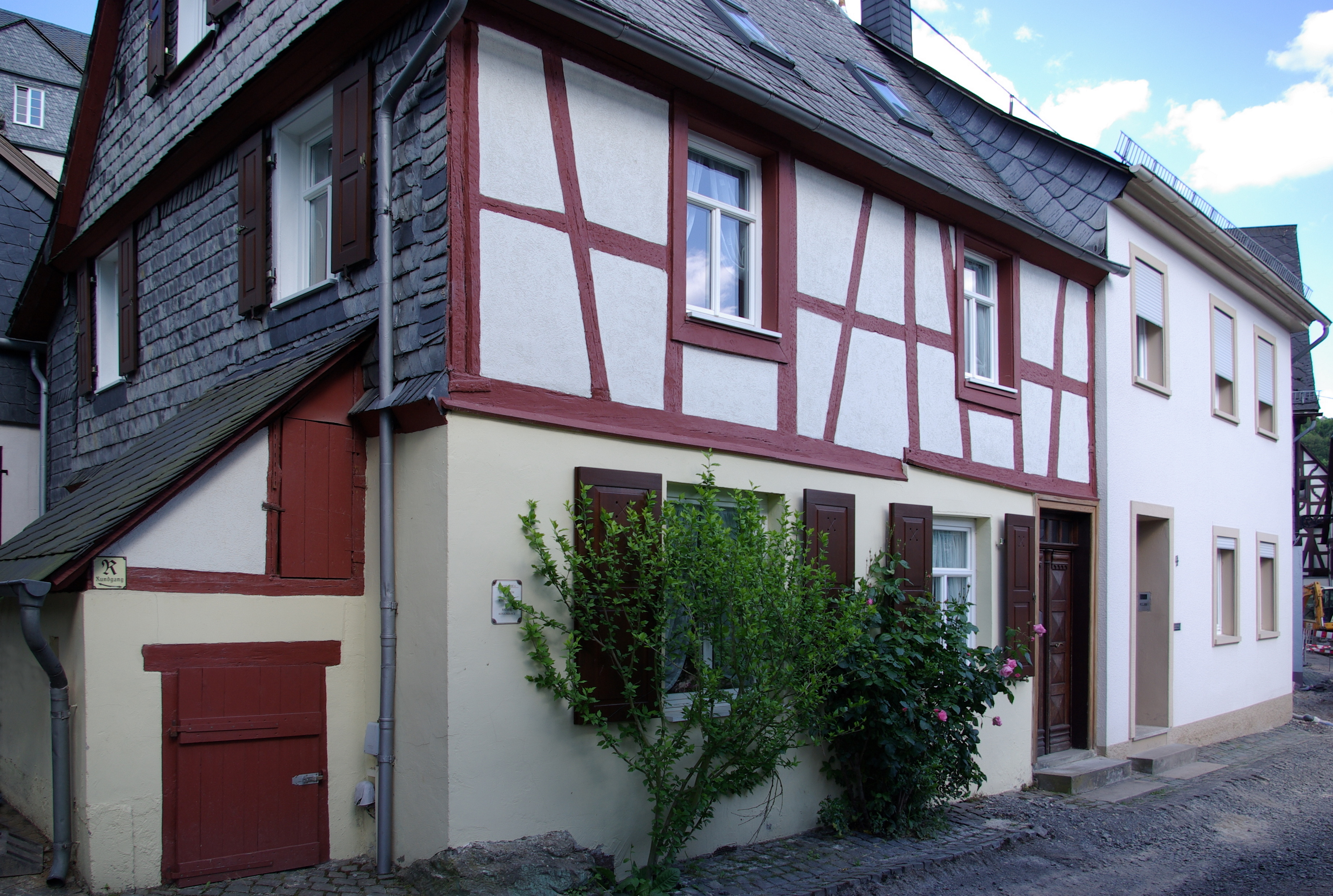
Timber-frame house

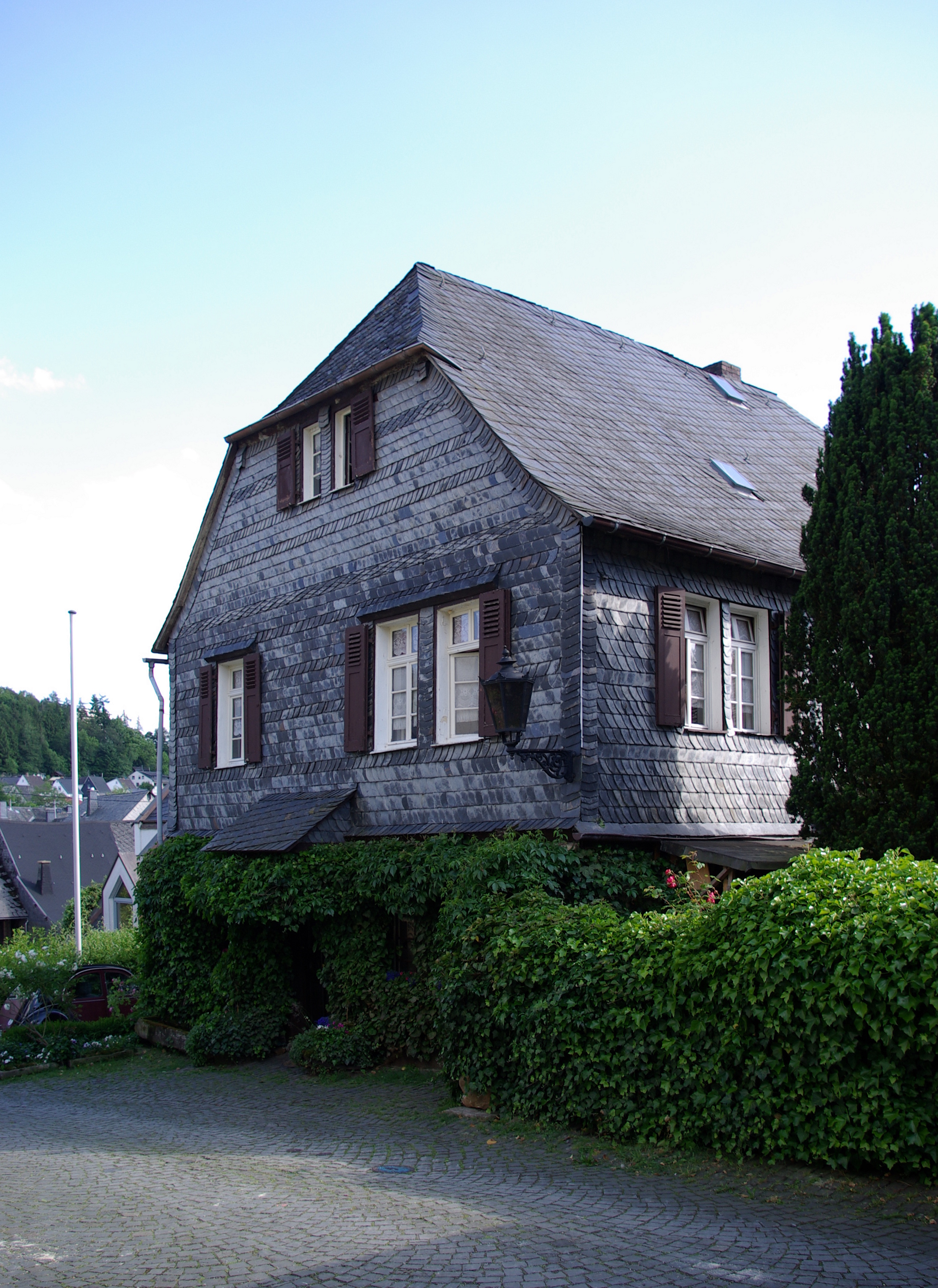
Slate-clad house

Herrstein (German pronunciation: [ˈhɛʁʃtaɪn]) is an Ortsgemeinde – a municipality belonging to a Verbandsgemeinde, a kind of collective municipality – in the Birkenfeld district in Rhineland-Palatinate, Germany. It is the seat of the Verbandsgemeinde Herrstein-Rhaunen.

== Geography ==
=== Location ===
The municipality lies in the Hunsrück south of the Idar Forest on the Deutsche Edelsteinstraße (“German Gem Road”) in the Naheland, roughly 10 km north of Idar-Oberstein. The Fischbach flows through the village.

=== Constituent communities ===
Also belonging to Herrstein are the outlying homesteads of Lindenhof, Steinäckerhof and Walkmühle.

== History ==
Herrstein owes its beginnings to the crags at which a little stream called the Dietersbach emptied into the Fischbach, which seemed like a good place to build a castle to watch over the lordly holdings near Niederwörresbach, from which Herrstein was at first administered. At the foot of this stronghold on the so-called Herren-Stein (“Lord’s Stone”) arose a village, as so often happened when a castle was built in the Middle Ages. The castle and the village belonged then to the Counts of Sponheim, and Herrstein grew in importance as the seat of a Sponheim Oberamtmann

The exact time when the village was first settled is lost in the mists of history, but on 9 April 1279, Herrstein had its first documentary mention along with a knight named Ruther von Heresteyn. The Count of Sponheim eventually granted this slowly developing village town and market rights in 1428, although there was still sometimes compulsory labour, and the townsmen were also obliged to do maintenance on the town wall.

It is unknown whether these town fortifications arose before town rights were granted or only afterwards, but whatever the case, they only afforded the inhabitants protection from attack, and thereby also only offered any incentive to settle here, until firearms were developed. In the 17th and 18th centuries, they had rather the opposite effect to the originally intended one, provoking enemies’ attacks instead, for it was believed that the town must harbour considerable booty. It was the Herrsteiners themselves who actually knocked parts of their girding wall down in 1674 when the enemy was making his way through the country.

Whether the wall was ever reconstructed and whether the second town gate planned in 1710 was ever built are things that are uncertain. What is known is that as early as the earlier half of the 18th century, the first house outside the town wall was built. Until that time, the only buildings there had been barns and buildings that had needed to be on the Fischbach, namely tanneries and mills.

In 1792, during the French Revolutionary Wars and Napoleonic times, Herrstein lost its town rights. However, Herrstein has kept its function as an administrative centre of one kind or another until the present day; it is currently the Verbandsgemeinde seat.

The Schinderhannesturm, a tower in Herrstein, gets its name from Schinderhannes (Johannes Bückler), Germany's most famous robber, who was locked up there for one night in 1798.

Further growth in the 18th and 19th centuries was largely thwarted by the municipality's failure to undergo population growth as so many places did at this time. The only expansion in the 19th century was a new “ring road” outside the old town wall, which allowed some new houses to be built right onto the outside of the wall.

The legacy of this time of meagre growth, however, had an unexpected advantage: nowhere else in the Nahe-Hunsrück area was there a mediaeval town that was so well preserved. Restoration on the old village centre began in 1971, including partial reconstruction of the town wall, most of which had been torn down to give the village growth room, and the result has been the driving force behind the village's tourism industry. Timber-frame houses that had had their framing plastered over or even covered with asbestos slabs were stripped to reveal their structure.

== Politics ==
=== Municipal council ===
The council is made up of 12 council members, who were elected by majority vote at the municipal election held on 7 June 2009, and the honorary mayor as chairman.

=== Mayor ===
Herrstein's mayor is Eberhard Weber.

=== Coat of arms ===
The German blazon reads: Über silbernem Schildfuß, darin ein blauer Dreiberg, von silbernem Faden gespalten, vorn blau-goldenes Schach, hinten rot-silbernes Schach.

The municipality's arms might in English heraldic language be described thus: Per fess abased an endorse argent between chequy azure and Or and chequy gules and argent, and argent issuant from base a mount of three of the second.

The two “chequy” fields in the arms are a reference to the village's former allegiance to the County of Sponheim. The composition is said to have been drawn from that in a court seal from the mid 17th century.

== Culture and sightseeing ==
=== Buildings ===
The following are listed buildings or sites in Rhineland-Palatinate’s Directory of Cultural Monuments:

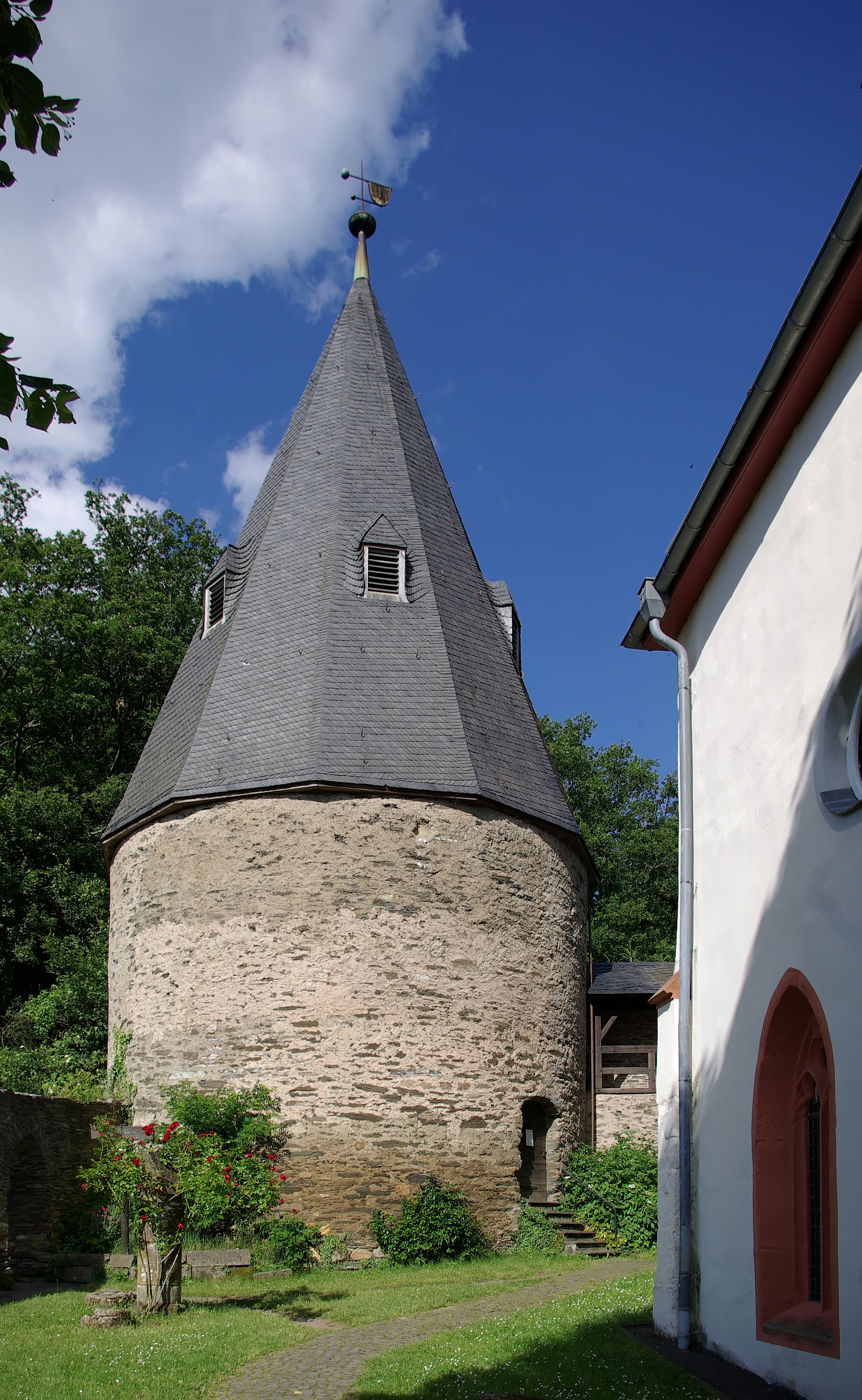
Castle Herrstein monumental zone: Stumpfer Turm

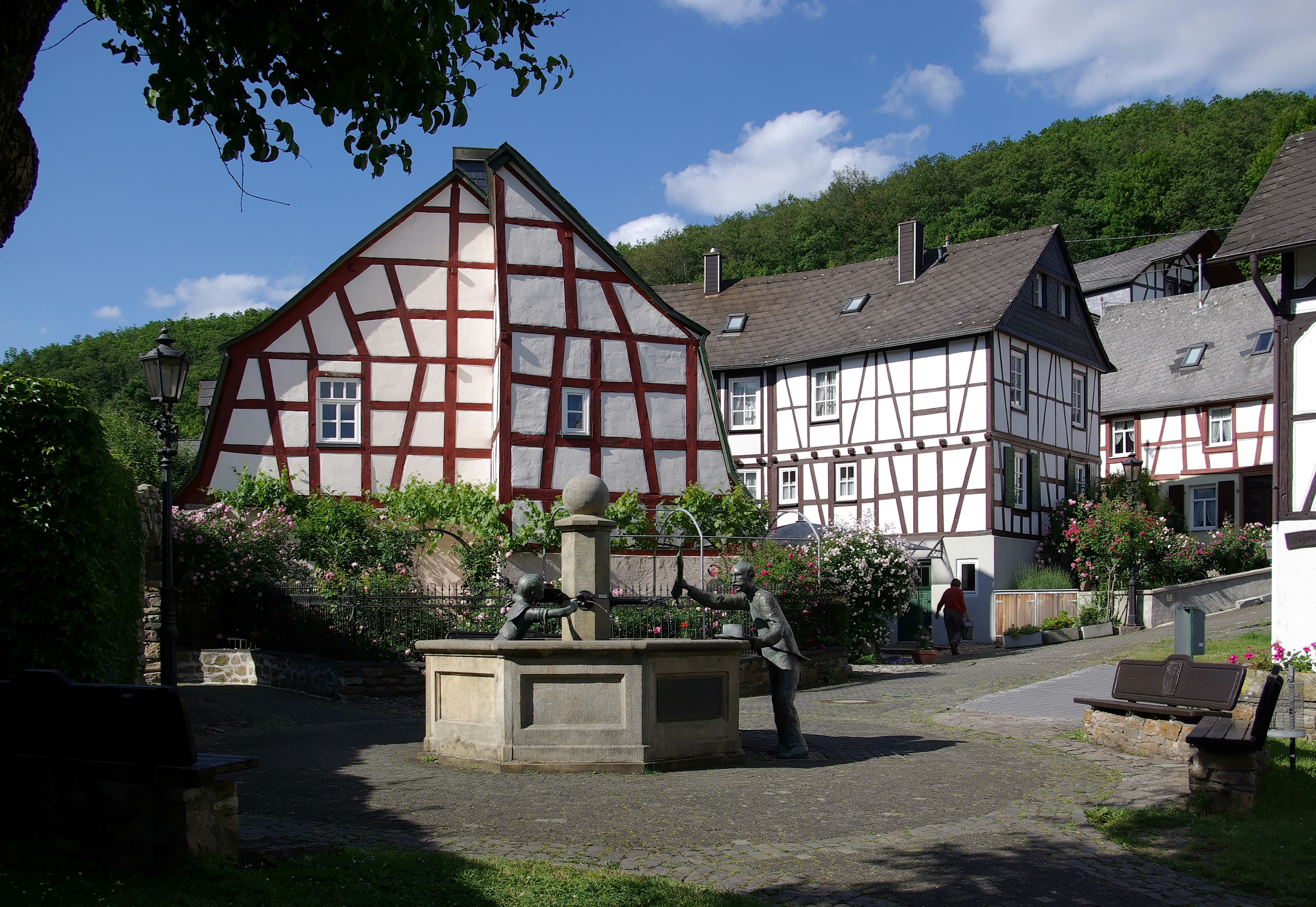
Village centre monumental zone

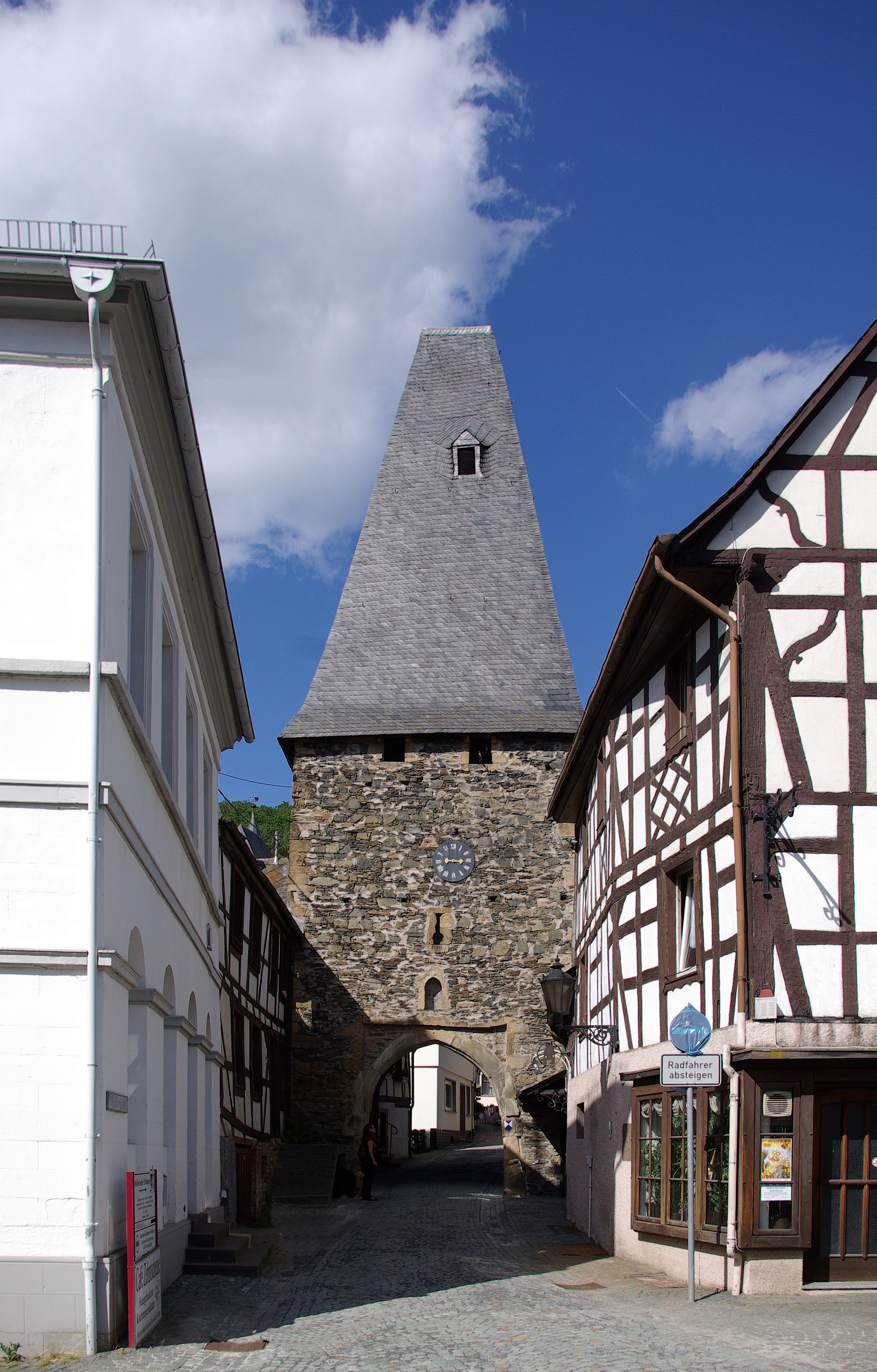
Uhrturmgasse: clocktower

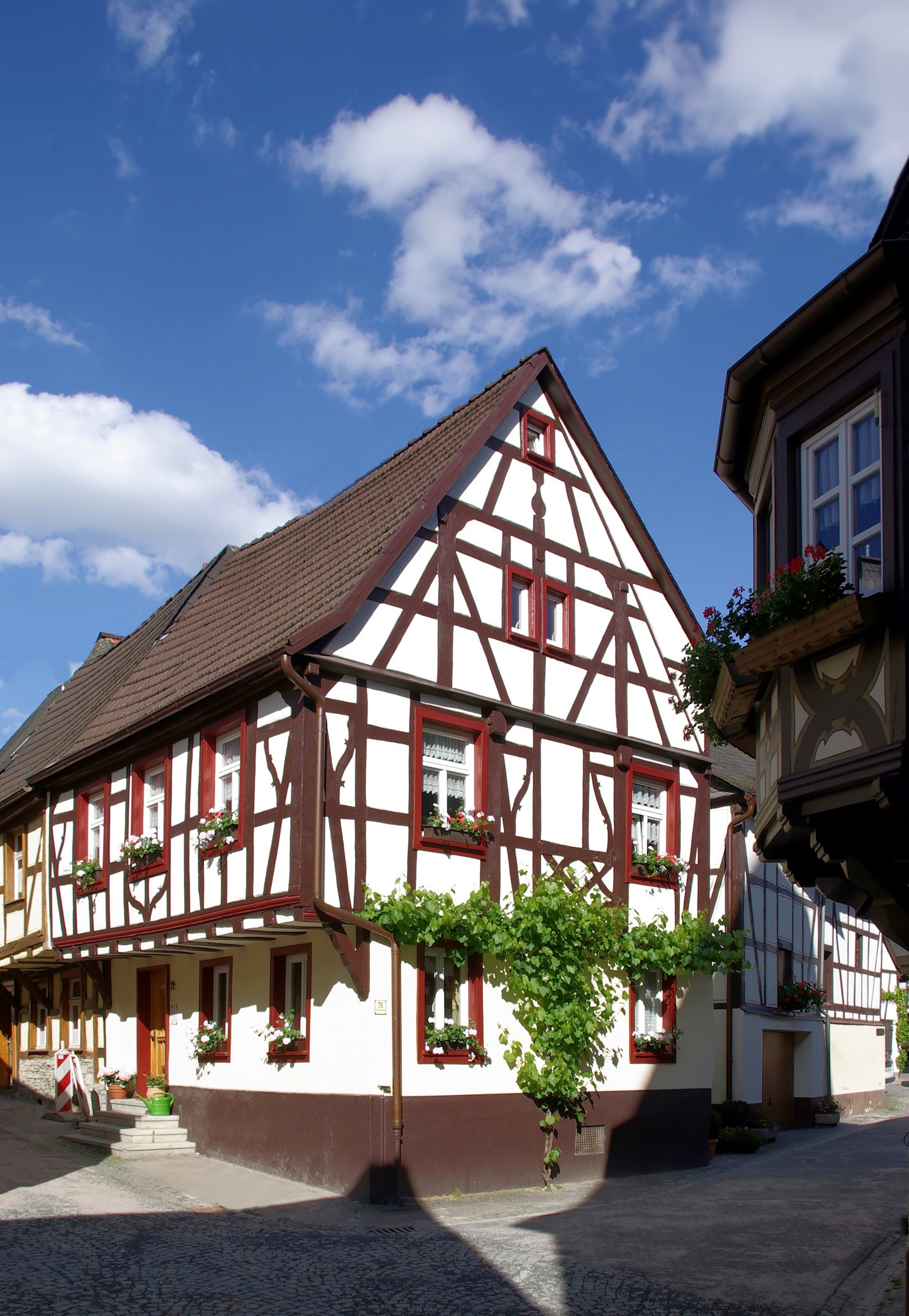
Uhrturmgasse 12: corner house

- Castle Herrstein, on the north side of the town settlement (monumental zone) – built in the latter half of the 13th century by the Counts of Sponheim; upper castle: fortress-type originally with four towers at the ringwall’s corners, three of which are preserved: Schinderhannesturm (“Schinderhannes Tower”), Stumpfer Turm (“Blunt Tower” or “Stubby Tower”; keep, today a churchtower), Sichelturm (“Sickle Tower”); former castle chapel since the 15th century a parish church; on the site of the bailey so-called Schloss (palatial castle) built in 1742 (Schlossweg 12)
- Evangelical parish church Schlosskirche, Schloßweg 14 – single-naved building, partly Gothic, partly Baroque; quire arch and east part of the south wall possibly from the late 13th century, five-eighths quire 1416, nave expanded in 1437 (dendrochronologically dated), west wall marked 1766; memorial stones from the 17th century
- Village centre, Hauptstraße, Niederhosenbacher Weg, Pfarrgasse, Schlossweg, Uhrturmgasse (monumental zone) – late mediaeval town settlement that arose in connection with the lordly castle within the town walls, houses with eaves facing the street in tight rows, partly going back to the 16th century, many timber-frame buildings
- Town fortifications – built beginning with the granting of town rights in 1428, abandoned in 1677, partly reconstructed in the late 20th century; Schinderhannesturm, Oberpforte (“Upper Gate”; 1711), Uhrturm (“Clocktower”), Sichelturm, parts preserved at Pfarrgasse 5, Uhrturmgasse 3, 4, 6, 8, Schlossweg 3, 5, 6, 10, 13
- Bachweg – two-arch sandstone quarrystone bridge over the Fischbach
- Hauptstraße 30 – former Bürgermeisterei (mayoral house); plastered building on a high melaphyre pedestal, hipped mansard roof, 1915; characterizes village's appearance
- Hauptstraße 44 – three-floor corner house, partly timber-frame, 1712; characterizes village's appearance
- Hauptstraße 45 – timber-frame row house, in the back two-floor wooden gallery, 1716
- Hauptstraße 46 – so-called Französische Schule (“French School”); Late Classicist building with hipped roof, 1854; characterizes village's appearance
- Hauptstraße 47 – timber-frame row house, in the back two-floor wooden gallery; 1716
- Hauptstraße 48 – house, partly timber-frame, 1715
- Hauptstraße 75 – Alte Schule (“Old School”); building with forms of Oldenburg Classicism, about 1840
- Niederhosenbacher Weg 12 – timber-frame house with commercial wing in the back, 1829; brick building in between about 1900
- Pfarrgasse 2 – house, partly timber-frame, 1680
- Pfarrgasse 5 – timber-frame barn with mansard roof, 1795; characterizes village's appearance
- Pfarrgasse 6 – house, partly timber-frame, partly slated, about 1595, conversion in the earlier half of the 19th century
- Pfarrgasse 7 – timber-frame house, about 1890, ground floor and gable use some pieces of wood from 1589
- Pfarrgasse 9 – rectory; two- or three-floor solid building, partly timber-frame (slated), 1716
- Schloßweg 1 – stately corner house, partly timber-frame, in the back wooden gallery, hipped mansard roof, marked 1801
- Schloßweg 2 – wood-shingled house, 1743
- Schloßweg 3 – timber-frame house, marked 1710
- Schloßweg 4 – three-side estate, partly timber-frame, in the inner yard surrounding wooden gallery, 1715
- Schloßweg 6 – stately timber-frame house, 1709/1710
- Schloßweg 11 – scattered estate; house, wooden gallery, marked 1855
- Schloßweg 12 – so-called Schloss (palatial castle); building with mansard roof above two vaulted cellars, 1741; terraced gardens
- Before Schloßweg 12 – warriors’ memorial for the victims of the First World War, stele with relief, design by Wilhelm Heilig, 1922
- Schloßweg 13 – former tithe barn, building with half-hipped roof, marked 1526
- Schloßweg 17 – house, partly timber-frame, 1692
- Schloßweg 18 – parallel estate, buildings with half-hipped roofs, partly timber-frame, partly slated, 1784
- Schloßweg 22 – former commercial building, partly timber-frame, mansard roof, marked 1816, essentially possibly older
- Schloßweg 24 – former inn, partly timber-frame, hipped mansard roof, 1723, spire light from the 19th century; characterizes street's appearance
- Uhrturmgasse – Uhrturm (“Clocktower”); three-floor Late Gothic gatetower, hipped roof, 1449 (dendrochronologically dated); Marienglocke (“Mary’s Bell”) from time of building
- Uhrturmgasse 3 – former house with stable on ground floor, timber-frame building, 1575; in the back commercial buildings, about 1775
- Uhrturmgasse 4 – corner house, partly timber-frame, 1698
- Uhrturmgasse 8 – house, partly timber-frame, partly slated, 1740; characterizes street's appearance
- Uhrturmgasse 9 – house, partly timber-frame, 1478
- Uhrturmgasse 10 – barn, partly timber-frame, marked 1747; characterizes street's appearance
- Uhrturmgasse 11 – house, partly timber-frame (plastered), in the back wooden gallery, mansard roof, after 1840
- Uhrturmgasse 12 – corner house, partly timber-frame, 1712
- Uhrturmgasse 14 – house, partly timber-frame (plastered), marked 1547
- Uhrturmgasse 16 – timber-frame corner house, partly solid, 1682; escutcheon in relief “Zur Krone”, 1844

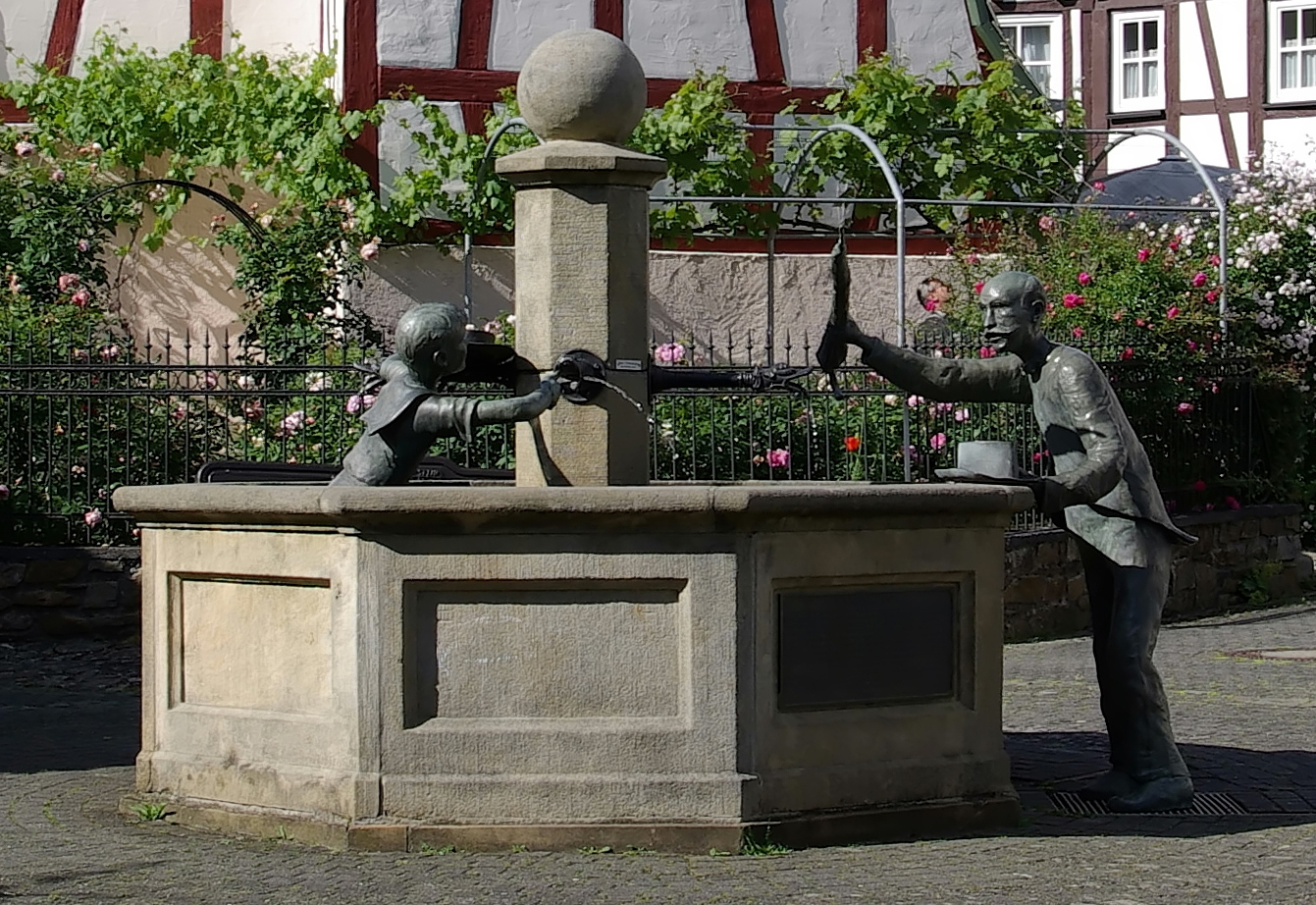
Hankelbrunnen in Herrstein

=== Inhabitants’ nickname ===
Hankel is a word that has been used as a nickname for Herrstein's inhabitants. It arose from the once locally common hyphenated forename “Johann-Karl”, which was elided to “Hann-Karl”, and then eventually to “Hankel”. Among the Hankels themselves, the term seems to mean a self-assured and usually also somewhat bigheaded member of the landed bourgeoisie. In the surrounding villages, though, the perception of the term rather differs.

At the so-called Hankelbrunnen, a fountain in Herrstein, the adult figure represents the Hankel. That the Hankel was often exposed to the chaffing of his surrounding area is symbolized by the boy, who is squirting him with water. The figures were created by the artist Hans-Ulrich Pauly (Veitsrodt) after an idea by mayor Wolfgang Hey, and poured in 1983 by the Glocken- und Kunstgießerei Rincker, a foundry in Sinn that makes bells and artistic objects.

=== Regular events ===
- Handwerkermarkt (Craftsmen's Market), second weekend in September
- Martinimarkt (Saint Martin's Market), first weekend in November

== Famous people ==
- Count Heinrich II of Sponheim, the Younger (b. between 1292 and 1295; d. before 11 October 1323), Loretta's husband, lived at Castle Herrstein
- Loretta of Sponheim (b. 1300; d. 1346), Count Heinrich II's wife, lived at Castle Herrstein
