= Herrstein (Verbandsgemeinde) =

Coordinates: 49.779°N 7.339°E

Herrstein is a former Verbandsgemeinde ("collective municipality") in the district of Birkenfeld, in Rhineland-Palatinate, Germany. The seat of the Verbandsgemeinde was in Herrstein. On 1 January 2020 it was merged into the new Verbandsgemeinde Herrstein-Rhaunen.

The Verbandsgemeinde Herrstein consisted of the following Ortsgemeinden ("local municipalities"):

1. Allenbach
2. Bergen
3. Berschweiler bei Kirn
4. Breitenthal
5. Bruchweiler
6. Dickesbach
7. Fischbach
8. Gerach
9. Griebelschied
10. Herborn
11. Herrstein
12. Hettenrodt
13. Hintertiefenbach
14. Kempfeld
15. Kirschweiler
16. Langweiler
17. Mackenrodt
18. Mittelreidenbach
19. Mörschied
20. Niederhosenbach
21. Niederwörresbach
22. Oberhosenbach
23. Oberreidenbach
24. Oberwörresbach
25. Schmidthachenbach
26. Sensweiler
27. Sien
28. Sienhachenbach
29. Sonnschied
30. Veitsrodt
31. Vollmersbach
32. Weiden
33. Wickenrodt
34. Wirschweiler
