= Dickesbach =

- Municipality
- Coat of arms

- Location of Dickesbach within Birkenfeld district
- Interactive map of Dickesbach
- Location within Germany Location within Rhineland-Palatinate
- Coordinates: 49°43′12″N 7°25′28″E
- Country: Germany
- State: Rhineland-Palatinate
- District: Birkenfeld
- Municipal assoc.: Herrstein-Rhaunen

Government
  - Mayor (2019–24): Heinz Matzen

Area
  - Total: 4.91 km^{2} (1.90 sq mi)
- Elevation: 315 m (1,033 ft)

Population (2025-12-31)
  - Total: 418
  - Density: 85.1/km^{2} (220/sq mi)
- Time zone: UTC+01:00 (CET)
  - Summer (DST): UTC+02:00 (CEST)
- Postal codes: 55758
- Dialling codes: 06784
- Vehicle registration: BIR
- Website: www.vg-herrstein.de

Dickesbach is a municipality (Ortsgemeinde) in the Verbandsgemeinde Herrstein-Rhaunen, Birkenfeld district, Rhineland-Palatinate, Germany.

== Geography ==
=== Location ===
The municipality lies in the Hunsrück east of the Nahe.

=== Neighbouring municipalities ===
Dickesbach borders in the north on Fischbach, in the east on Mittelreidenbach, in the south on the Baumholder troop drilling ground and in the west on Idar-Oberstein.

=== Constituent communities ===
Also belonging to Dickesbach are the outlying homesteads of Katzenrech and Sonnenhöfe.

== History ==
Barrows between Dickesbach and Mittelreidenbach are of Celtic origin and suggest that people were already living in the area sometime between 1100 and 400 BC. According to one report, hewn stones were brought to light while ploughing was being done in Dickesbach about 1900. These were reckoned to have been used as channelling. At the site of this find, the Scheed (or Scheide), lying between Weierbach (nowadays an outlying centre of Idar-Oberstein) and what is now Dickesbach, it is believed that a settlement of some kind once stood, and that today's Dickesbach arose only after this old settlement had vanished.

In 1367, Dickesbach had its first documentary mention in a document that contained a list of contributions that the villages of Berschweiler, Dickesbach, Mittelreidenbach, Mörschied, Niederhosenbach, Niederwörresbach and Oberreidenbach in the Pflege (literally “care”, but actually a local geopolitical unit) of Niederwörresbach had to make to the Vogtei – in chickens. Dickesbach was in the County of Zweibrücken in those days. There are, however, doubts as to whether this was truly the village's first documentary mention. Among others contributing to these doubts was the Gutsvorsteher (head of a Gutsbezirk, or “estate area”) Alfons Hartmann, who wrote in his book Ergänzung der Chronik des Gutsbezirk Baumholder mit den Chroniken der ehemaligen Einzelgehöfte und Mühlen (roughly “Supplement to the Estate Area’s Chronicle With Those From the Former Smallholds and Mills”) – on page 31 – that Dickesbach had already been named as a municipality belonging to the parish of Kirchenbollenbach as early as the 13th century. It could even be that Dickesbach's first documentary mention came about 200 years earlier than the mention in the chicken tax document, a copy of which is on hand in the municipality of Dickesbach.

In 1526, the parish of Kirchenbollenbach, in which Dickesbach lay, belonged to Duke Ludwig II of Palatinate-Zweibrücken (reigned 1514–1532), and he yielded that same year to the parish's and the municipalities’ wish to make the parish of Kirchenbollenbach Evangelical. In 1557, Duke Wolfgang, Ludwig II's son, decreed a church system for his country, based on the 1555 Peace of Augsburg, which saw the parish of Kirchenbollenbach become Lutheran.

In 1595, the parish of Kirchenbollenbach came under the lordship of the Waldgraves and Rhinegraves of Kyrburg, who, after the Peace of Augsburg, had openly joined the Protestant camp.

By 1681, French King Louis XIV had annexed the Amt of Kyrburg and occupied Kirn by reason of a ruling by his Chambre des Réunions. The French supported their fellow Catholics in whatever way they could, which eventually led to a Royal order on 21 December 1684, whereby any centre that had two churches had to relinquish the smaller one to the Catholics. However, any centre that had only one church had to share it between the two denominations.

The patchwork of microstates that characterized what is now Germany up until the 1870-1871 Franco-Prussian War was particularly fragmenting in the Dickesbach area and resulted in an absurd tangle of boundaries. This sometimes led to rather ridiculous disputes, a case in point being the dispute over the Idarbann, quite a small piece of territory, that erupted in 1766 when the Lord of Oberstein, Count Christian Karl Reinhard, died. The Amtmann of Birkenfeld, named Fabert, occupied the bridge over the Idarbach with some 400 armed peasants and militiamen. The Saarbrücken Kammerrat advanced with 80 soldiers and the Commissioner of Trier with 90. The whole business was occasioned by Forester Görlitz's sticking letters patent of seizure by the Lordship of Nassau-Saarbrücken on Peter Georg Juchem's house in Idar. In response, Fabert and the court Schöffe (roughly “lay jurist”) Trein hurried there to tear the letters patent off Juchem's house and there hang the Sponheim coat of arms instead.

In early November 1803, Schinderhannes and his band of brigands were put to death in Mainz. One of these was a man from Dickesbach, a field ranger named Philipp Klein, nicknamed Husarenphilipp (“Hussar Philipp”). The great trial against Johannes Bückler (Schinderhannes) and his confederates in robbery had ended that month in death sentences, by guillotine, for this was Napoleonic times and the region was under French rule, for 19 of the band's robbers besides Bückler himself. After the sentences were read out, the court reporter in Mainz wrote the following: “When the accused were given refreshments, at which time Bückler behaved extremely calmly, the so-called Husarenphilipp took his breakfast with a coldness, as though nothing concerned him.”

This seemingly hard-bitten man, Phillip Klein, was born in Wickenrodt and was employed in Dickesbach as a field ranger. He became involved with Johannes Bückler (Schinderhannes), and even worked to wive him. Julie Bläsius (known by the nickname “Julchen”) told the trial judge this story: “A man from Dickesbach, whose name I do not know, came to my birthplace. He met me with my sister Margarethe at the Jakob Fritsch inn. He told me and my sister Margarethe to come with him into the forest, called Dollbach (Dollberg), which lies only a quarter hour from our village, as there would be somebody there who wanted to talk to us, but without telling us his name or the object of his invitation. Although I did not want to betake myself there on this vain suggestion, the man from Dickesbach managed to talk me into going with him. My sister Margarethe went with us. When I came into the forest, I met a handsome young person there, who suggested to me that I leave my parents and follow him. Since I did not want to accept his suggestion, the many lovely promises that he was incessantly making to me notwithstanding, he threatened to kill me and in this way, I was persuaded by violence to follow this stranger. Only much later, when I was also already too far from my parents, did I learn that the man who kidnapped me was the so-called Schinderhannes.”

In 1815, at the time of the Congress of Vienna, the village had 151 inhabitants. In 1838, the local land register was set up. The village itself had 36 houses. In 1839, there were 42 building owners. The first schoolhouse was built in 1840.

In 1847, the Evangelical school at Dickesbach received from King Frederick William IV of Prussia a gift of a Bible, which is now owned by the Ortsgemeinde.

The graveyard was laid out in 1850. Formerly, the dead had been buried in nearby villages according to denomination: Evangelicals in Kirchenbollenbach (now part of Idar-Oberstein) and Catholics in Mittelreidenbach, since burials could only take place on consecrated ground. Outside the graveyard as it is now, behind the sandstone cross, was the Catholic section, and before the cross was the Evangelical section. Later, on the former, now removed, Catholic section, a weeping willow was planted, which can still be seen today.

In 1856, a typhus epidemic claimed 27 lives. On 15 July 1858, the Bingerbrück-Kreuznach railway line came into service, with the extension from Kreuznach to Oberstein following on 15 December 1859. Also that year, several houses in Dickesbach were burnt down in a great fire. On 25 May 1860, the whole railway from the Rhine to the Saar was dedicated.

In 1871, at the time of victory in the Franco-Prussian War, Dickesbach had 209 inhabitants. In 1892, Hahne Wilhelm opened the village's first village shop, but the following year, it burnt down. In 1895, the village hall on Oberdorfstraße was built.

On 15 December 1896, church arrangements in the parish were settled. The simultaneum at the church in Kirchenbollenbach came to an end with a 13,000-mark payment that transferred ownership to the Protestants alone. In 1898, Wilhelm Hahn opened the village's first inn. By the end of the 19th century, electricity was making its presence felt throughout the Nahe region. In 1903, however, the reeve (Ortsvorsteher) refused a proposal to build waterworks. In 1907, the first telephone line reached Dickesbach, with the first telephone being installed at Julius Jakobi's house.

That same year, a compulsory fire brigade was established (as of 1953, this became a volunteer fire brigade). In politics, the Bürgermeisterei (“Mayoralty”) of Sien was dissolved on 1 December and Dickesbach was grouped with Weierbach.

In 1910, at Whitsun, the road to Weierbach was opened. It had cost 34,500 marks to build. Until this opening, traffic had had to take a rough road that led along the foot of the Dollberg. In 1915, a road to Zaubach (nowadays an outlying centre of Birkenfeld) was built as well.

Also in 1914 came the outbreak of hostilities in the First World War.

On the morning of 16 January 1918, between Hochstetten and Martinstein, shortly before the fork in the road leading into the Kellenbach valley, furlough train 843 from Saarbrücken, bound for Mainz, fully occupied by German soldiers, derailed. Thirty-four dead were recovered from the river Nahe, and of a further nine, no trace could be found. The cause was determined to have been track that had been undermined by heavy rainfall.

In all, the First World War claimed 13 Dickesbach men's lives, with some known to have been killed in action, and others to have gone missing in action.

In 1920, the Restkreis of St. Wendel was formed with its seat at Baumholder. A Restkreis was a “leftover district”, so called when the French-ruled Saarland was established and its border cut through long-established districts. The part left within the zone of German sovereignty was then reconstituted as a Restkreis. Dickesbach was grouped into the Restkreis of St. Wendel.

On 29 December 1922, electric light burnt for the first time in Dickesbach, and candlelight, at least as an everyday means of lighting, was consigned to history.

In 1923 came the hyperinflation for which the Weimar Republic was so notorious. It had ended by November that same year, but not before a US dollar could be bought for nothing less than 1,000,000,000,000 marks.

In 1927, Dickesbach had 268 inhabitants, 224 Evangelical and 44 Catholic. The municipal area measured 418 ha, of which 160 ha was wooded; the municipality owned 149 ha of these woodlands.

In Niederhausen, the electrical substation came into service in 1927, linking the whole Nahe region to the RWE grid and the great coal-fired power stations. Gas lanterns and kerosene lamps were thus also consigned to history.

It was not until 17 April 1929 that work finished on the new waterworks, 26 years after the reeve had refused the original proposal. Until this time, water had had to be drawn from wells.

On 13 August 1938, in the time of the Third Reich, the first building firms came. On the heights, 11 Siegfried Line bunkers were built. On both sides of Oberdorfstraße, buildings went up: two buildings to lodge non-commissioned officers, and a Flakhalle – literally “anti-aircraft hall” – with personnel rooms. As part of these measures, a new drainage ditch reinforced with quarrystones was built along the road, and the road itself was also fortified. Dickesbach thus became a community on the edge of the newly laid out Baumholder troop drilling ground. In 1939, the municipality had 256 inhabitants.

An army field hospital was set up at the nearby Niederreidenbacher Hof in 1939. In 1940, Wehrmacht personnel were quartered at the Schwenk inn. That same year, an incendiary bomb attack on the Colony Building at the Niederreidenbacher Hof claimed 63 lives.

On 8 May 1945, Field Marshal Wilhelm Keitel signed the surrender document at Karlshorst, ending the war in Europe.

In all, the Second World War claimed 25 Dickesbach men's lives, with some known to have been killed in action, and others to have gone missing in action.

By war's end, the number of houses in the village was 53 and by 1950 the village's population was 321. That same year, the first new building development zone (Schulstraße) was opened. In 1953, the volunteer fire brigade was established, and two years later, the brigade's equipment house was built.

In 1956, the municipality acquired from a citizen, Anna Hahn, a building lot to make more room for building a new school building. It cost 1,300 marks. Also that year, during Flurbereinigung, the municipality made available some municipal land for widening the road to Zaubach. Some cropland in outlying areas that was no longer cultivated was allowed to revert to woodland. In June 1956, a survey was done in preparation for the establishment of outlying farmsteads (Aussiedlerhöfe). The municipality gave the farmstead group 23 ha of land at a price of 1,000 marks for each hectare to set up the Sonnhöfe (actually one homestead, even though the name is grammatically plural). Some woods had to be cleared to make way for cropfields.

On 22 December 1956, municipal council decided to build a new schoolhouse in line with planning by the Birkenfeld Building Office because the older building, and the teacher's house, too, had fallen into such disrepair.

In 1958, the monument to the fallen and missing in both world wars was festively dedicated on Whitsunday. Also in 1958, the first tractor bought by a local farmer appeared in the municipality. It was owned by Heinrich Jakobi.

== Politics ==
=== Municipal council ===
The council is made up of 8 council members, who were elected by majority vote at the municipal election held on 7 June 2009, and the honorary mayor as chairman.

=== Mayor ===
Dickesbach's mayor is Heinz Matzen, and his deputies are Steven Arnold and Detlef Petry.

=== Coat of arms ===
The municipality's arms might be described thus: Per bend gules three lozenges conjoined in bend argent, each charged with a roundle sable, and Or a lion rampant of the first armed and langued azure.

The charge on the sinister (armsbearer's left, viewer's right) side is the lion from the arms formerly borne by the Waldgraves and Rhinegraves, who once held the village. The lozenges (diamond shapes) on the dexter (armsbearer's right, viewer's left) side recall another former feudal lordship, namely the Lords of Boos. The black roundles are likewise a reference to a former allegiance, this one to the Lords of Sickingen.

The arms have been borne since 27 April 1964.

== Economy and infrastructure ==
=== Transport ===
To the northwest runs Bundesstraße 41, and to the east Bundesstraße 270. Nearby Fischbach has a station on the Nahe Valley Railway (Bingen–Saarbrücken).
