= Gerach, Rhineland-Palatinate =

Gerach
- Municipality
- Coat of arms

- Location of Gerach within Birkenfeld district
- Interactive map of Gerach
- Location within Germany Location within Rhineland-Palatinate
- Coordinates: 49°45′15″N 7°20′27″E
- Country: Germany
- State: Rhineland-Palatinate
- District: Birkenfeld
- Municipal assoc.: Herrstein-Rhaunen

Government
  - Mayor (2019–24): Thomas Juchem

Area
  - Total: 2.29 km^{2} (0.88 sq mi)
- Elevation: 391 m (1,283 ft)

Population (2025-12-31)
  - Total: 242
  - Density: 106/km^{2} (274/sq mi)
- Time zone: UTC+01:00 (CET)
  - Summer (DST): UTC+02:00 (CEST)
- Postal codes: 55743
- Dialling codes: 06785
- Vehicle registration: BIR

Gerach (German pronunciation: [ˈɡeːʁax]) is an Ortsgemeinde – a municipality belonging to a Verbandsgemeinde, a kind of collective municipality – in the Birkenfeld district in Rhineland-Palatinate, Germany. It belongs to the Verbandsgemeinde Herrstein-Rhaunen, whose seat is in Herrstein.

== Geography ==
=== Location ===
South of Gerach are not only Idar-Oberstein’s extensive municipal area but also the Ortsgemeinden of Hintertiefenbach and Vollmersbach. The Deutsche Edelsteinstraße (“German Gem Road”), which runs by to the north, also links Gerach to the Ortsgemeinden of Veitsrodt, Niederwörresbach and Fischbach as well as to the administrative seat of the Verbandsgemeinde of Herrstein.

=== Constituent communities ===
Also belonging to Gerach is the outlying homestead of Geracher Mühle.

== Politics ==
=== Municipal council ===
The council is made up of 6 council members, who were elected by majority vote at the municipal election held on 7 June 2009, and the honorary mayor as chairman.

=== Mayor ===
Gerach's mayor is Thomas Juchem, and his deputies are Günter Schmähler and Wolfgang Schüler.

=== Coat of arms ===
The municipality's arms might be described thus: Per bend sinister argent a hammer and pick per saltire sable and chequy gules and argent, issuant from base a bishop's staff of the second.

== Culture and sightseeing ==
The Geracher Wasserschleiferei, a water-driven gem-cutting mill, dates from 1874.

== Economy and infrastructure ==
=== Transport ===
To the southeast runs Bundesstraße 41. In Fischbach is a railway station on the Nahe Valley Railway (Bingen–Saarbrücken).
