= Veitsrodt =

- Municipality
- Coat of arms

- Location of Veitsrodt within Birkenfeld district
- Interactive map of Veitsrodt
- Location within Germany Location within Rhineland-Palatinate
- Coordinates: 49°45′23″N 07°18′07″E
- Country: Germany
- State: Rhineland-Palatinate
- District: Birkenfeld
- Municipal assoc.: Herrstein-Rhaunen

Government
  - Mayor (2019–24): Julia Hagner

Area
  - Total: 7.94 km^{2} (3.07 sq mi)
- Elevation: 460 m (1,510 ft)

Population (2025-12-31)
  - Total: 700
  - Density: 88/km^{2} (230/sq mi)
- Time zone: UTC+01:00 (CET)
  - Summer (DST): UTC+02:00 (CEST)
- Postal codes: 55758
- Dialling codes: 06781
- Vehicle registration: BIR
- Website: www.veitsrodt.de

Veitsrodt is an Ortsgemeinde – a municipality belonging to a Verbandsgemeinde, a kind of collective municipality – in the Birkenfeld district in Rhineland-Palatinate, Germany. It belongs to the Verbandsgemeinde Herrstein-Rhaunen, whose seat is in Herrstein.

== Geography ==
=== Location ===
The municipality lies at the edge of the Hunsrück on the Deutsche Edelsteinstraße (“German Gem Road”), roughly 5 km north of Idar-Oberstein.

=== Neighbouring municipalities ===
Veitsrodt borders in the north on the municipality of Herborn, in the east on the municipality of Niederwörresbach, in the south on the municipality of Vollmersbach, in the west on the town of Idar-Oberstein and the municipality of Kirschweiler and in the northwest on the municipality of Kempfeld. Veitsrodt also meets the town of Idar-Oberstein elsewhere, at a single point in the southeast.

=== Constituent communities ===
Also belonging to Veitsrodt are the outlying homesteads of Lindenhof, Strudthof and Ziegelhütte.

== History ==
Veitsrodt most likely arose in Frankish times, in the 9th or 10th century. In the early 13th century, Veitsrodt had its first documentary mention in a directory of fiefs kept by Saint Maximin's Abbey in Trier. The village was then known simply as Rodt, which was descriptive of how it had arisen, namely as a clearing (Modern High German: Rodung) in the forest. Veit meant the same as Vogt (“reeve”), and it can therefore easily be assumed that the village's name stemmed from the Waldgravial Vögte (the plural of Vogt) within whose administrative holdings Veitsrodt found itself for centuries. On the other hand, the church in Veitsrodt was consecrated to Saint Vitus (called Veit in German), which would mean that the name meant “Vitus’s Clearing”. Saint Maximin's Abbey held the church patronage rights and the tithes in Veitsrodt at the beginning of the 13th century.

Whatever the name's origins, it is clear that by the time of first documentary mention, the village had already existed for quite some time. In 1319, Raide found itself under the lordship of the Waldgraves of Kyrburg. In a 1375 partition agreement, it was named as Rode. Enfeoffment documents from 1434 referred to it as Vogtei des Hofes Raide (Vogtei meant a reeve's office or responsibilities; des Hofes is genitive for der Hof, meaning “the estate”)

Beginning in the late 15th century, the village was called by its modern name, Veitsrodt. Also from this time on, it always belonged to the Amt of Wildenburg, until French Revolutionary/Napoleonic times. For centuries, Veitsrodt had a Schultheiß and a clergyman. In 1798, Veitsrodt was grouped by the French occupational authorities into the Mairie (“Mayoralty”) of Herrstein in the canton of Herrstein. After Napoleon’s downfall and the Congress of Vienna, Veitsrodt became German again, but still remained in the same mayoralty, now known as the Bürgermeisterei of Herrstein. In 1815 the village passed to Prussia and in 1817 to the Principality of Birkenfeld, an exclave of the Grand Duchy of Oldenburg, most of whose territory was in what is now northwest Germany, with a coastline on the North Sea. From 1910 to 1933 it belonged to the Bürgermeisterei of Idar-Land, before being transferred back to the Mayoralty (now called Amtsbürgermeisterei) of Herrstein.

Judicially, Veitsrodt belonged to the Wildenburg high court. Veitsrodt itself formed a court district within this high court district at which the Rhinegraves were the low and high justices.

According to the 1514 Weistum (a Weistum – cognate with English wisdom – was a legal pronouncement issued by men learned in law in the Middle Ages and early modern times) of Vitrirode, three yearly things were to be held: the first on the Tuesday after the Schurer Kirbe (the fair in nearby Schauren, three weeks after Christmas); the second on the Tuesday after Walpurgis Night; the third on the Tuesday after Saint Bartholomew's Night. Dates and times for these meetings were not announced, so well known were they.

=== Schinderhannes ===
Living in the village from 1795 to 1798 was the family of the notorious outlaw Johannes Bückler, commonly known as Schinderhannes. Bückler's father Johann worked as a field ranger and a day labourer. Schinderhannes lived with his family, at least in the earlier part of this time. He sometimes ran errands for the landlord, Mr. Koch from Veitsrodt. On 16 September 1798, Joseph Bückler, Schinderhannes's younger brother, was confirmed in Veitsrodt.

== Politics ==
=== Municipal council ===
The council is made up of 12 council members, who were elected by majority vote at the municipal election held on 7 June 2009, and the honorary mayor as chairman.

=== Mayor ===
Veitsrodt's mayor is Karl-Bernd Hartmann, and his deputies are Jürgen Schneider and Rolf Schuch.

=== Coat of arms ===
The municipality's arms might be described thus: Per bend sable a bull's head caboshed and in base two dexter hands clasped fesswise couped bendwise below the wrists, all Or, and Or a lion rampant gules armed and langued azure.

== Culture and sightseeing ==
=== Buildings ===
The following are listed buildings or sites in Rhineland-Palatinate’s Directory of Cultural Monuments:

- Former Evangelical church, behind Kirchstraße 16: aisleless church with ridge turret with several levels, 1752; rich décor, Bernhard Engisch, Kirn; organ, ascribed to the Brothers Stumm; Marienglocke (“Saint Mary's Bell”), 1499 by Nikolaus von Echternach
- Hauptstraße 19: schoolhouse; six-axis country school building, typical for its time, 1882

==== Church ====
The one building that characterizes the village is the Baroque Evangelical church in the village centre, outfitted with an organ by the famous family of organ builders Stumm. From 1804 to 1811, Friedrich Christian Laukhard was the pastor here, and during his time in Veitsrodt, he set some of his works to paper. The church also has a bell more than 500 years old, which came through both world wars without being seized and melted down.

=== Market ===
In Veitsrodt, markets, especially cattle markets, have been being held for more than 500 years. Bearing witness to this are two charges in the civic coat of arms, a bull's head and a pair of clasped hands, symbolizing agreement on a deal. For 175 years now, the market has borne the name Veitsrodter Prämienmarkt. On the second weekend in July, it is held on the market lands near Veitsrodt. Offered each year is a broad array of merchandise at over 300 market stalls.

== Economy and infrastructure ==
=== Transport ===
Veitsrodt has two bus stops. While one is right in the village, the other one, Veitsrodt Markt (the outlying marketplace mentioned above), is to be found just under a kilometre from the village. Routes 346 and 351 stop in Veitsrodt. The termini are Herrstein/Wickenrodt and Rhaunen/Frankfurt-Hahn Airport respectively.

==== German Gem Road ====
The Deutsche Edelsteinstraße (“German Gem Road”) runs straight through the village. In 1971, the German Gem Road's “stone guestbook” was laid out. This is a hiking trail edged with selected boulders from a nearby quarry.
