= Bergen, Rhineland-Palatinate =

Bergen
- Municipality
- Coat of arms

- Location of Bergen within Birkenfeld district
- Interactive map of Bergen
- Location within Germany Location within Rhineland-Palatinate
- Coordinates: 49°46′52″N 7°25′04″E
- Country: Germany
- State: Rhineland-Palatinate
- District: Birkenfeld
- Municipal assoc.: Herrstein-Rhaunen

Government
  - Mayor (2019–24): Stephan Ruppenthal

Area
  - Total: 10.42 km^{2} (4.02 sq mi)
- Elevation: 400 m (1,300 ft)

Population (2025-12-31)
  - Total: 489
  - Density: 46.9/km^{2} (122/sq mi)
- Time zone: UTC+01:00 (CET)
  - Summer (DST): UTC+02:00 (CEST)
- Postal codes: 55608
- Dialling codes: 06752
- Vehicle registration: BIR
- Website: www.bergen-nahe.de

Bergen (German pronunciation: [ˈbɛʁɡn̩]) is an Ortsgemeinde – a municipality belonging to a Verbandsgemeinde, a kind of collective municipality – in the Birkenfeld district in Rhineland-Palatinate, Germany. It belongs to the Verbandsgemeinde Herrstein-Rhaunen, whose seat is in Herrstein.

== Geography ==
=== Location ===
The municipality lies in the Hunsrück, 3 km west of Kirn and 9 km northeast of Idar-Oberstein.

=== Land use ===
The greater part of municipal area is covered by a 4.5 km^{2} forest, and most of the rest of this rural village's land is taken up by cropland.

== History ==
In 926, Bergen had its first documentary mention. To the southwest once lay the now vanished village of Staufenberg.

After the Second World War, the village still had more than sixty businesses that were active in agriculture. Nowadays there are only seven, most of which are run as sidelines.

Until 1969, Bergen still had its own primary school; after it closed that year, schoolchildren were transferred to the nearby town of Kirn in Bad Kreuznach district. In 1995, the Verbandsgemeinde of Herrstein opened a two-group kindergarten with an intake capacity of 50 three- to six-year-olds. This is meant to serve not only Bergen, but also the neighbouring municipalities of Berschweiler, Griebelschied and Sonnschied.

== Politics ==
=== Municipal council ===
The council is made up of 8 council members, who were elected by majority vote at the municipal election held on 7 June 2009, and the honorary mayor as chairman.

=== Mayor ===
Bergen's mayor is Stephan Ruppenthal.

=== Coat of arms ===
The municipality's arms might be described thus: Per bend sable a mount of three per bend argent and Or a lion rampant gules armed and langued azure.

The charge on the sinister (armsbearer's left, viewer's right) side is the lion borne as an heraldic device by the Waldgraves and Rhinegraves who held the village in the Middle Ages. The charge on the dexter (armsbearer's right, viewer's left) side is canting for the village's name. It is taken to be three mountains (Berge in German; Bergen, however, would be the form in the dative case).

The arms have been borne since 23 May 1962.

== Culture and sightseeing ==
=== Buildings ===
The following are listed buildings or sites in Rhineland-Palatinate’s Directory of Cultural Monuments:

- Evangelical parish church, Hauptstraße 62a – Gothic Revival aisleless church strongly characterized by Classicism, 1860–1862, architects L. Rhumbler, Alzey, and J. Lang, Kreuznach; in the tower foyer a gravestone, 1686
- Hauptstraße 55 – Quereinhaus (a combination residential and commercial house divided for these two purposes down the middle, perpendicularly to the street), marked 1874, five-axis sandstone dwelling wing with knee wall, commercial part, partly timber-frame, possibly from the 1850s; stable, marked 1856
- Mühlenweg 3 – Quereinhaus with knee wall, half-hipped roof, after the middle of the 19th century

=== Clubs ===
Besides the sport club, SV 07, there are the promotional club of the Bergen fire brigade (Förderverein der Freiwilligen Feuerwehr Bergen), an angling club, a countrywomen's club (Deutscher Landfrauenverband) and the Evangelical Women's Aid.

== Economy and infrastructure ==
Besides the farming operations, there are craft businesses and one inn with pension lodging.
