= Sensweiler =

- Municipality
- Coat of arms

- Location of Sensweiler within Birkenfeld district
- Interactive map of Sensweiler
- Location within Germany Location within Rhineland-Palatinate
- Coordinates: 49°46′12″N 07°12′00″E
- Country: Germany
- State: Rhineland-Palatinate
- District: Birkenfeld
- Municipal assoc.: Herrstein-Rhaunen

Government
  - Mayor (2019–24): Axel Brunk

Area
  - Total: 8.43 km^{2} (3.25 sq mi)
- Elevation: 517 m (1,696 ft)

Population (2025-12-31)
  - Total: 452
  - Density: 53.6/km^{2} (139/sq mi)
- Time zone: UTC+01:00 (CET)
  - Summer (DST): UTC+02:00 (CEST)
- Postal codes: 55758
- Dialling codes: 06786
- Vehicle registration: BIR

Sensweiler is an Ortsgemeinde – a municipality belonging to a Verbandsgemeinde, a kind of collective municipality – in the Birkenfeld district in Rhineland-Palatinate, Germany. It belongs to the Verbandsgemeinde Herrstein-Rhaunen, whose seat is in Herrstein.

== Geographie ==
Sensweiler lies in the Upper Idarbach valley in the Hunsrück. The municipal area is 61.1% wooded.

=== Constituent communities ===
Also belonging to Sensweiler are the outlying homesteads of Sensweiler Mühlen and Waldhof.

=== Neighbouring municipalities ===
Sensweiler borders in the north on the municipality of Bruchweiler, in the east on the municipality of Kempfeld, in the southeast on the municipality of Hettenrodt, in the south on the municipality of Siesbach, in the southwest on the municipality of Allenbach, in the west on the municipality of Wirschweiler and in the northwest on the municipality of Langweiler.

== History ==
Old Celtic stone walls are to be found within municipal limits, and there is a reconstruction of a village such as the ones built by the Treveri, a people of mixed Celtic and Germanic stock, from whom the Latin name for the city of Trier, Augusta Treverorum, is also derived. Indeed, there have been archaeological finds right near the village centre dating back to 400 BC.

On 7 June 1969, part of Wirschweiler's municipal area containing 325 inhabitants was transferred to Sensweiler. On 1 January 1992, Sensweiler's outlying centre – Ortsteil – of Langweiler with its 290 inhabitants was demerged from Sensweiler to become a self-administering municipality in its own right.

== Politics ==
=== Municipal council ===
The council is made up of 12 council members, who were elected by majority vote at the municipal election held on 7 June 2009, and the honorary mayor as chairman.

=== Mayor ===
Sensweiler's mayor is Axel Brunk.

=== Coat of arms ===
The municipality's arms might be described thus: Per bend vert a church Or with windows and doors sable, the steeple to sinister, and two ears of wheat slipped bendwise in fess, the one to dexter bladed, of the first seeded of the second, and Or a lion rampant gules armed and langued azure.

== Culture and sightseeing ==
=== Buildings ===
The following are listed buildings or sites in Rhineland-Palatinate’s Directory of Cultural Monuments:

- Evangelical church, Hauptstraße 14 – quire tower possibly from the 12th century, nave essentially possibly mediaeval, given a Baroque makeover in the 18th century; three bells: 12th century (?), 1615 by Master Daniel, 1671 by Matias Cromel
- An der Kirche 2 – house, partly timber-frame (slated), 1862
- Auf dem Hauel 3 – Quereinhaus (a combination residential and commercial house divided for these two purposes down the middle, perpendicularly to the street), latter half of the 19th century; smithy, marked 1869, technical equipment
- Hauptstraße 31 – stately Quereinhaus, marked 1835
- Graveyard, east of the village – Emilie Kürschner tomb, cut-off oak log, late 19th century

=== Museums ===
The Geologisches Freimuseum im Krahlochwald (“Open-Air Geological Museum in the Krahloch Forest”) features natural mineral formations, erratics, broken and carved boulders from all geological time periods (some 550,000,000 years old). These sample stones lie in a row along a roughly 1.5 km-long walking path, each with an exhaustive information plaque. Well-kept furniture sets of wood and stone and a small children's playground encourage visitors to linger. Admission is free.

=== Art ===
Sensweiler is home to an art workshop and a painting school, which features a creative cradle by the WEIBER-ART group.

=== Sport and leisure ===
Sensweiler has two campgrounds (Oberes Idartal and Sensweiler Mühle) as well as an angling pond in the Krahloch Forest right nearby, and also near the open-air geological museum.

== Notable people ==
- Gerd Edinger (b. 1951), German artist
