= Niederhosenbach =

- Municipality
- Coat of arms

- Location of Niederhosenbach within Birkenfeld district
- Interactive map of Niederhosenbach
- Location within Germany Location within Rhineland-Palatinate
- Coordinates: 49°47′43″N 7°22′51″E
- Country: Germany
- State: Rhineland-Palatinate
- District: Birkenfeld
- Municipal assoc.: Herrstein-Rhaunen

Government
  - Mayor (2019–24): Markus Schnurr

Area
  - Total: 7.43 km^{2} (2.87 sq mi)
- Elevation: 360 m (1,180 ft)

Population (2025-12-31)
  - Total: 302
  - Density: 40.6/km^{2} (105/sq mi)
- Time zone: UTC+01:00 (CET)
  - Summer (DST): UTC+02:00 (CEST)
- Postal codes: 55758
- Dialling codes: 06785
- Vehicle registration: BIR

Niederhosenbach is an Ortsgemeinde – a municipality belonging to a Verbandsgemeinde, a kind of collective municipality – in the Birkenfeld district in Rhineland-Palatinate, Germany. It belongs to the Verbandsgemeinde Herrstein-Rhaunen, whose seat is in Herrstein.

== Geography ==
=== Location ===
The municipality lies north of the river Nahe between Kirn and Herrstein. The municipal area is 43.4% wooded.

=== Neighbouring municipalities ===
Niederhosenbach's neighbours are Herrstein, Breitenthal, Wickenrodt, Sonnschied, Griebelschied and Bergen.

=== Constituent communities ===
Also belonging to Niederhosenbach are the outlying homesteads of “Auf dem Büchelchen”, “Heupenmühle” and “Zwischen den Seen”.

== History ==
=== Vanished village ===
South of Niederhosenbach, on the Hosenbach's left bank before the “Allholz” woods and opposite the Etzelberg (mountain) once stood a village named Hitzelhosenbach. A plaque at the site recalls the now long-vanished village. Standing at the spot where the road from Niederhosenbach to Fischbach crosses the brook was the Etzelberger Mühle (mill), which burnt down in 1913.

== Politics ==
=== Municipal council ===
The council is made up of 8 council members, who were elected by majority vote at the municipal election held on 7 June 2009, and the honorary mayor as chairman.

=== Mayor ===
Niederhosenbach's mayor is Markus Schnurr.

=== Coat of arms ===
The German blazon reads: In schräglinks geteiltem Schild vorne in Silber über blauem Wellenschrägbalken die blauen Buchstaben N und H, hinten rot-silbernes Schach, belegt mit einem schwarzen Dreiberg.

The municipality's arms might in English heraldic language be described thus: Per bend sinister argent a bend wavy abased above which the letters N and H in bend, and chequy gules and argent issuant from base a mount of three sable.

The letters N and H on the dexter (armsbearer's right, viewer's left) side refer to the municipality's name, as does the wavy bend (slanted stripe; the ending —bach means “brook” in German), while the “chequy” field on the sinister (armsbearer's left, viewer's right) side is a reference to the village's former allegiance to the County of Sponheim, and the mount of three – a charge called a Dreiberg in German heraldry – stands for the Amt within the County of Sponheim in which Niederhosenbach lay, namely Herrstein (whose name literally means “Lordstone”). Niederhosenbach even today lies in a Verbandsgemeinde of that same name.

== Culture and sightseeing ==
=== Buildings ===
The following are listed buildings or sites in Rhineland-Palatinate’s Directory of Cultural Monuments:

- Evangelical church, Kirchstraße 5 – Late Gothic quire, marked 1518; Gothic Revival nave, 1842-1844; essentially mediaeval tower (Romanesque?), belfry 1842; Stumm organ, 1896; bell, 1894 by Jakob Pfeiffer, Kaiserslautern
- Fischbachstraße 1 – house, Renaissance Revival, 1880s
- Hauptstraße 39 – Quereinhaus (a combination residential and commercial house divided for these two purposes down the middle, perpendicularly to the street), partly timber-frame (plastered), Baroque dwelling section marked 1786
- Talstraße 9 – scattered estate; house from earlier half of the 19th century, bakehouse, stables
- Bridge, east of the village – one-arch quarrystone bridge over a tributary to the Hosenbach

== Economy and infrastructure ==
=== Transport ===
Running southeast of the municipality is Bundesstraße 41. Serving nearby Fischbach is a railway station on the Nahe Valley Railway (Bingen–Saarbrücken).
