= Vollmersbach =

- Municipality
- Coat of arms

- Location of Vollmersbach within Birkenfeld district
- Interactive map of Vollmersbach
- Location within Germany Location within Rhineland-Palatinate
- Coordinates: 49°44′37″N 07°18′26″E
- Country: Germany
- State: Rhineland-Palatinate
- District: Birkenfeld
- Municipal assoc.: Herrstein-Rhaunen

Government
  - Mayor (2019–24): Dieter Petsch

Area
  - Total: 2.44 km^{2} (0.94 sq mi)
- Elevation: 390 m (1,280 ft)

Population (2025-12-31)
  - Total: 452
  - Density: 185/km^{2} (480/sq mi)
- Time zone: UTC+01:00 (CET)
  - Summer (DST): UTC+02:00 (CEST)
- Postal codes: 55758
- Dialling codes: 06781
- Vehicle registration: BIR
- Website: www.vollmersbach.de

Vollmersbach is an Ortsgemeinde – a municipality belonging to a Verbandsgemeinde, a kind of collective municipality – in the Birkenfeld district in Rhineland-Palatinate, Germany. It belongs to the Verbandsgemeinde Herrstein-Rhaunen, whose seat is in Herrstein.

== Geography ==
=== Location ===
The municipality lies in the Hunsrück just north of Idar-Oberstein.

=== Neighbouring municipalities ===
Vollmersbach borders in the north on the municipality of Veitsrodt and in the east, south and west on the town of Idar-Oberstein. Vollmersbach also meets the municipality of Niederwörresbach at a single point in the northeast.

== History ==
In the 1st century BC, the region between the rivers Nahe and Meuse was inhabited by the Treveri, a people of mixed Celtic and Germanic stock, who crossed the Rhine quite early on and settled in the area where Vollmersbach now lies, and from whom the Latin name for the city of Trier, Augusta Treverorum, is also derived. Until Drusus's time – shortly before the Christian Era – they lived fully independently, even while recognizing the Roman Empire’s hegemony in the region. They were grouped into the Roman province of Germania Superior. Unhindered, Roman influence made itself felt in the Vollmersbach area, and the Empire’s borders spread beyond the Rhine.

Still preserved from that time are parts of the extensive road network that the Romans built for transport through their conquered provinces. Such a road ran near where Vollmersbach now lies. The stretch within municipal limits, which is still used today, is known to the local inhabitants simply as the Strohs, a dialectal form of the German word Straße (“street” or “road”), thereby giving it the meaning that it actually bore fifteen centuries ago when it was the only road that linked the inhabitants to neighbouring centres and the main roads.

In the 4th century, the Alamanni were thrusting their way into Roman territory on the Rhine's left bank, and may even have settled in what is now Vollmersbach. With the partition of the Frankish Empire negotiated in the 843 Treaty of Verdun, the three Gaue (roughly “shires”) on the Rhine's left bank, the Wormsgau, the Speyergau and the Nahegau, passed to Louis the German’s inheritance. The Nahegau’s nearby border villages were Hammerstein, Enzweiler, Idar-Algenrodt (all three of which are nowadays part of Idar-Oberstein), Mackenrodt, Hettenrodt and Kirschweiler. The border led on up the Idarbach to its source and to the Schwarzwälder Hochwald (forest). From this time forth, Vollmersbach is witnessed continuously, but for a brief interruption in the 13th century, in historical records.

Vollmersbach was settled quite early on. It is among the district’s oldest populated centres. In 902, Vollmersbach had its first documentary mention, although it is likely somewhat older. In 990, Vollmersbach was mentioned by the name Folemarisbach along with the Saint Maximin’s Abbey holding of Siemora (Simmern and Dhaun). The village was also mentioned as belonging to Saint Maximin’s in a 1044 document that used the slightly different spelling Folemaresbach. It is unknown how this name developed into the modern name Vollmersbach. Moreover, what is also unknown is whether these documents are genuine. They could be among the many so-called Saint Maximin’s Abbey forgeries.

Whatever the truth about the documents is, the fact that there is also a brook with the name Vollmersbach (Bach is German for “brook”) implies that the village must have lain either near or right on this brook. In ascertaining where the oldest part of the village lay, two local cadastral names are important: “In der Hubstatt” and “Am Hofgarten” (the latter literally means “at the estate garden”, while the first syllable of the former is a corruption of Hof – estate – with the full name meaning “in the estate place”). A further estate area seems to have sprung up in the 14th century, early in the time when Vollmersbach belonged to the lordship of Oberstein, in the upper part of the village. It is to this place that the cadastral name “Am Hofgarten”, used until 1822, refers.

Thereafter, the estate or the manor house would have stood on the plot nowadays known as the Dörn’sches Grundstück, which is where the ancestral seat of the now widespread family Dreher stood until a few years ago, as likewise did the tithe barn, which was Vollmersbach's oldest building.

It was from this site that reconstruction began after the widespread destruction wrought by the Thirty Years' War. The old upper village formed Vollmersbach's core until the early 19th century. Here were found an old public well, the first watermain, a winepress, and, built in 1856, the “springing well”.

Along with Oberstein, which had hitherto been under Prussian administration, Vollmersbach passed on 9 April 1817 to the newly formed Principality of Birkenfeld, an exclave of the Grand Duchy of Oldenburg, most of whose territory was in what is now northwest Germany, with a coastline on the North Sea. Vollmersbach, which had always belonged politically to Oberstein, passed upon the formation of the Stadtbürgermeisterei (“town mayoralty”) of Oberstein in 1902 to the Bürgermeisterei (“Mayoralty”) of Idar-Land. This mayoralty was abolished with effect from 9 October 1933 by the Nazis, and on the same day, Vollmersbach was grouped into the Bürgermeisterei of Herrstein.

The Second World War came home to Vollmersbach on the night of 9–10 August 1943 when an RAF Handley Page Halifax piloted by Jim Pestridge crashed in a meadow in the municipality. It had been shot down during an attack on Mannheim by German night fighter pilot Oberleutnant Johannes Engels over Idar-Oberstein. Three of the four crewmen died in the wreck, but Pestridge managed to save himself by bailing out. He came down near Nahbollenbach (now an outlying centre of Idar-Oberstein) and was later captured at Birkenfeld railway station.

=== Population development ===
Vollmersbach's population grew from the end of the Thirty Years' War to the onset of the Third Reich thus (all figures but the first are rough estimates):

Year	Population
1648	11
1679	40
1751	90
1815	152
1832	218
1845	244
1855	271
1933	442

== Politics ==
=== Municipal council ===
The council is made up of 12 council members, who were elected by majority vote at the municipal election held on 7 June 2009, and the honorary mayor as chairman.

=== Mayor ===
Vollmersbach's mayor is Dieter Petsch, and his deputies are Jürgen Christmann and Hartmut Gutendorf.

=== Coat of arms ===
The municipality's arms might be described thus: Per pale argent a lion rampant gules armed and crowned Or, and azure a fess wavy between a saltire humetty and Saint Andrew's Well in trian aspect, all of the first.

The charge on the dexter (armsbearer's right, viewer's left) side, the lion, is the device formerly borne by the Oberstein Estate, the feudal lordship that once held Vollmersbach. The wavy fess (that is, horizontal stripe) on the sinister (armsbearer's left, viewer's right) side stands for the village's namesake river. The saltire (that is, X-shaped cross) is Saint Andrew’s attribute, and the trough below the fess is Saint Andrew’s Well (Andreasbrunnen).

The arms have been borne since 27 November 1963.

== Culture and sightseeing ==
=== Buildings ===
The following are listed buildings or sites in Rhineland-Palatinate’s Directory of Cultural Monuments:

- Flurstraße 5 – prefabricated house; cube-shaped clapboard building with hipped roof, 1925

==== Saint Andrew’s Well ====
Saint Andrew’s Well (Andreasbrunnen in High German, or Ennerschbure in the local speech) lies towards the west end of the municipal area. In bygone times, healing effects were always ascribed to the well’s water. Those seeking health were still coming here, and giving thanks for their healing in the form of at least three white things: an egg, a silver coin and a white child’s shirt.

=== Gemstones ===
Vollmersbach lies on the themed tourist route called the Deutsche Edelsteinstraße (“German Gem Road”), and is also 1992-1994 German Gemstone Queen Kerstin Huth's home village.

=== Clubs ===
Vollmersbach has always been known for two sports in particular. As early as about 1900, tennis and field handball were being played. Today, TV Vollmersbach (TV here stands for Turnverein – “gymnastic club”) plays tennis with many youth teams and a strong men's team. Since 2000, TV Vollmersbach has been playing team handball in a combined effort with the gymnastic club in Idar in the Rhineland Handball League. In the 2010/2011 season, the men's team was playing in the State League.

== Economy and infrastructure ==
=== Transport ===
Running through Vollmersbach are bus routes 346 and 351 run by ORN (Omnibusverkehr Rhein-Nahe) within the RNN (Rhein-Nahe-Nahverkehrsverbund), which runs at least every two hours to Idar-Oberstein's railway station, which as a Regional-Express and Regionalbahn stop, is linked by way of the Nahe Valley Railway (Bingen–Saarbrücken) to the Saarland and the Frankfurt Rhine Main Region. The Rhein-Nahe-Express running the Mainz-Saarbrücken route serves the station hourly. Every other train goes through to the main railway station in Frankfurt with a stop at Frankfurt Airport. Formerly, fast trains on the Frankfurt-Paris route had a stop at Idar-Oberstein. The bus trip to the station takes 12 minutes.

Outbound buses go into the Hunsrück, to Rhaunen, Herrstein and Wickenrodt, although some go through to Frankfurt-Hahn Airport. This trip takes roughly 45 minutes.

There are three bus stops in Vollmersbach, Ort, Klepp and Türmchen, although the last one is served only once daily by a school bus.

Within the framework of “village renewal” in 2009 and 2010, the whole village thoroughfare was redeveloped.

=== Gemstone industry ===
Cropraising and livestock raising must have become secondary occupations quite early on, for in the days of the earliest known gemstone cutters, names from Vollmersbach crop up. The art of engraving in Vollmersbach was famous within professional circles. The local merchandise was and still is shipped to customers all round the world. A few firms in the village today process industrial stones for a great variety of different purposes.

=== Public institutions ===
With the opening of the new community centre in 1987, people in Vollmersbach had for the first time an opportunity to pursue cultural and sporting interests at facilities designed with them in mind. The floor plan inside is well subdivided. Besides a modern sporthall, there is also an inn.
