= Herrstein-Rhaunen =

- Verbandsgemeinde
- Location of Herrstein-Rhaunen within Birkenfeld district
- Interactive map of Herrstein-Rhaunen
- Location within Germany Location within Rhineland-Palatinate
- Coordinates: 49°47′N 7°20′E
- Country: Germany
- State: Rhineland-Palatinate
- District: Birkenfeld
- Seat: Herrstein
- Subdivisions: 50 municipalities

Area
  - Total: 334.76 km^{2} (129.25 sq mi)

Population (2025-12-31)
  - Total: 22,495
  - Density: 67.197/km^{2} (174.04/sq mi)
- Time zone: UTC+01:00 (CET)
  - Summer (DST): UTC+02:00 (CEST)
- Website: www.vg-hr.de

Herrstein-Rhaunen is a Verbandsgemeinde ("collective municipality") in the district of Birkenfeld, Rhineland-Palatinate, Germany. The seat of the Verbandsgemeinde is in Herrstein. It was formed on 1 January 2020 by the merger of the former Verbandsgemeinden Herrstein and Rhaunen.

The Verbandsgemeinde Herrstein-Rhaunen consists of the following Ortsgemeinden ("local municipalities"):

1. Allenbach
2. Asbach
3. Bergen
4. Berschweiler bei Kirn
5. Bollenbach
6. Breitenthal
7. Bruchweiler
8. Bundenbach
9. Dickesbach
10. Fischbach
11. Gerach
12. Gösenroth
13. Griebelschied
14. Hausen
15. Hellertshausen
16. Herborn
17. Herrstein
18. Hettenrodt
19. Hintertiefenbach
20. Horbruch
21. Hottenbach
22. Kempfeld
23. Kirschweiler
24. Krummenau
25. Langweiler
26. Mackenrodt
27. Mittelreidenbach
28. Mörschied
29. Niederhosenbach
30. Niederwörresbach
31. Oberhosenbach
32. Oberkirn
33. Oberreidenbach
34. Oberwörresbach
35. Rhaunen
36. Schauren
37. Schmidthachenbach
38. Schwerbach
39. Sensweiler
40. Sien
41. Sienhachenbach
42. Sonnschied
43. Stipshausen
44. Sulzbach
45. Veitsrodt
46. Vollmersbach
47. Weiden
48. Weitersbach
49. Wickenrodt
50. Wirschweiler
