= Kempfeld =

- Municipality
- Coat of arms

- Location of Kempfeld within Birkenfeld district
- Interactive map of Kempfeld
- Location within Germany Location within Rhineland-Palatinate
- Coordinates: 49°47′28″N 07°15′35″E
- Country: Germany
- State: Rhineland-Palatinate
- District: Birkenfeld
- Municipal assoc.: Herrstein-Rhaunen

Government
  - Mayor (2019–24): Horst Albohr

Area
  - Total: 9.66 km^{2} (3.73 sq mi)
- Elevation: 526 m (1,726 ft)

Population (2025-12-31)
  - Total: 759
  - Density: 78.6/km^{2} (203/sq mi)
- Time zone: UTC+01:00 (CET)
  - Summer (DST): UTC+02:00 (CEST)
- Postal codes: 55758
- Dialling codes: 06786
- Vehicle registration: BIR
- Website: www.kempfeld.de

Kempfeld is an Ortsgemeinde – a municipality belonging to a Verbandsgemeinde, a kind of collective municipality – in the Birkenfeld district in Rhineland-Palatinate, Germany. It belongs to the Verbandsgemeinde Herrstein-Rhaunen, whose seat is in Herrstein.

== Geography ==
=== Location ===
The municipality lies on the Deutsche Edelsteinstraße (“German Gem Road”) in the southern Hunsrück between the Idar Forest in the north and the town of Idar-Oberstein in the south.

=== Constituent communities ===
Also belonging to Kempfeld are the hamlet of Katzenloch and the outlying homesteads of Auf dem Steinberg, Herrenflur and Wildenburg.

== Village’s name ==
Kempfeld was originally settled by a man named Campo. On the other hand, other researchers derive the name from the Latin campus, meaning field (and since Feld means the same, the name would therefore mean “Field Field”). This hypothesis is, however, contradicted by the dialectal name “Käfelt” and the mediaeval name cempinvelt from 1319.

== History ==
In a copy of the Liber Aureus (St. Maximin's Abbey's “Golden Book”), which came into being about 1200, Kempfeld had its first documentary mention.

Matched by the extensive network of paths was relatively heavy settlement in individual homesteads, which belonged mostly to local people, but in almost every municipality in the Kempfeld area, traces of habitation from Roman times (roughly 50 BC to AD 375) can be found. The Romans built their houses from stone, put their dead in stone chests and built memorials to them, and monuments to their gods, out of stone. In 1901, one of these cist graves was unearthed 500 m south of the village on the way to Katzenloch. This, however, yielded no further knowledge.

About 950, the Emichones sat as the Graugrafen (“Gau Counts”) in the Nahegau. They were related to the Salian Imperial house. In the 11th century, they already held the Gau in hereditary ownership, and also, they were naming themselves after castles: in 1107 the Counts of Schmidtburg, in 1098 the Counts of Flonheim, in 1128 the Counts of Kyrburg and in 1103 Comites silvestres, later the Waldgraves (or Wildgrafen in German).

Towards the late 12th century, three lines of the Emichones had arisen as two new ones split away from the main one: the Counts of Veldenz in 1129 and the Raugraves in 1140.

In 1263, the Waldgraviate was partitioned, with the Schmidtburg and Kyrburg going to Emich, and Dhaun and Grumbach to Gottfried. The so-called Landgraviate, however, remained undivided and in common ownership. Only nineteen years later, in 1282, came another partition between members of the house's main line: Konrad kept Schmidtburg while Gottfried got Kyrburg and the paternal rights to Bruchweiler, Kempfeld, Breitenthal and Oberhosenbach. High jurisdiction and woodlands remained commonly held. In 1319, the communal high jurisdiction over Raide (Veitsrodt), Horbure (Herborn), Bruchwilre (Bruchweiler), Schuren (Schauren), Kempvelt (Kempfeld), Huisinbach (Niederhosenbach), Breidendail (Breitenthal) and three villages that have since vanished, Dudinsbach (Diedesbach), Vockinhusen (Fuckenhausen) and Dyfenbach, was documented.

In 1330, the last count of the Schmidtburg line died. He had been in a longstanding feud with his cousin Friedrich von der Kyrburg. So that Friedrich could not get the inheritance to which he was entitled by lawful, written documents, the late count had arranged for Archbishop of Trier Baldwin to be enfeoffed with the Schmidtburg (castle) and its appurtenances, and also Bundenbach. In 1328, Friedrich had built a castle of his own, the Wildenburg, but by 1330 he was forced to enfeoff Archbishop Baldwin with this.

Kempfeld formed together with Veitsrodt in the Middle Ages a lordship of St. Maximin's Abbey in Trier. A letter of enfeoffment from 1483 for the Waldgraves of Dhaun still exists.

Within Kempfeld's municipal limits lie two sites on which once stood now vanished villages. Schalwen, or Schalben, lay below the road leading to Wildenburg and Katzenloch. On the other side of this road once lay the execution place, where the gallows could be set up as needed. After the 1574 boundary-defining Grenzweistum (a Weistum – cognate with English wisdom – was a legal pronouncement issued by men learned in law in the Middle Ages and early modern times), not only Kempfeld's municipal area along with the Wildenburg belonged to the High Court of Wildenburg, but so did Asbach, Herborn, Veitsrodt, the woods of Wenzel and Vitsruth, the now vanished village of Fuckenhausen and part of Kirschweiler. The local hangman, who was also a knacker, lived outside the village of Schalben. The hangman played a role in the people's lives and thoughts. As a knacker he handled, among other things, hides, skins and leather. Both trades were regarded as dishonest, and their practitioners as unclean, hence the reason for his living outside the village rather than in it. He also had to set up his sales stall at markets apart from the rest.

The other vanished village within Kempfeld's municipal limits was Baalsbach, or Badelsbach. Bearing witness to this place is a cadastral name “Auf Baalsbach”.

A report from the time after the Thirty Years' War about Kempfeld mentions both Schalwen and Baalßpach, but by that time, they had both already been forsaken, and their lands conceded to Kempfeld. At that time, though, there were still remnants to be seen of both villages. Even as early as 1514, a Weistum had described Baalsbach as vergangen (“past” or “bygone”), meaning that it was no longer there.

The last Amtmann of the Wildenburg, Johann Karl Ruppenthal (1767–1798), managed to get himself into the villagers’ bad books. As Ruppenthal rode through the village late one evening with his riflemen, the night watchman apparently blew the wrong signal on his horn. As punishment, the watchman was made to practise the right signal the whole night long, which almost drove the Kempfelders to uncontainable fury. They complained about this inconsiderate disturbance of their usual nighttime quiet at once in Kirn, but nothing was done about Ruppenthal's behaviour.

Another time, the Amtmann happened upon the Kempfelders as they were arguing with a tithe official. Ruppenthal flew into such a rage over the peasants’ supposed stubbornness that without further ado he had his riflemen lock them all up in the church. This, however, only angered the imprisoned men's wives and, arming themselves with brooms and threshing flails, they then drove Ruppenthal out of the village. This scene is still remembered today by a fountain at the square on Allenberger Weg.

In 1529, a church was built in Kempfeld, which was renovated in the 18th century. On 25 August 1911, the church was utterly destroyed in a great fire in which the bells also melted. The plan for reconstructing the church was delivered by the Mayor of Cologne at that time, Senz, who had also headed reconstruction efforts for the church in Hottenbach in 1903.

The whole village was stricken by the fire. It broke out in the afternoon in the Stumm Brewery's stables. That summer's drought made the fire impossible to contain. Within half an hour, all houses and barns near the source of the fire were in flames. Besides the church, five houses, six barns, the brewery and one slaughterhouse were burnt down. The fire came almost exactly a century after another, similar great fire raged in the same place in August 1811.

On 1 August 1914, after the First World War had broken out, 11 Landsturm personnel, 10 Landwehr men, 10 reservists from Kempfeld had to go to war, and 15 recruits from the village found themselves in training. Even by early August, four men from Kempfeld had fallen; by Christmas it was seven.

On Sunday 17 October 1926, a memorial was dedicated at the village graveyard to the 21 who had fallen in the Great War.

During the Second World War, too, Kempfeld suffered heavily, and many local men fell. Moreover, several bombs fell on the village, in which 200 evacuees had taken refuge.

On 30 August 1975, yet another great fire struck Kempfeld, destroying, once again, the church, and also three houses. It broke out in a small house on Hauptstraße towards 10:45. Despite a large contingent from the fire brigade, the fire could not be stopped from spreading to the neighbouring house. A house once owned by a lordship and two, smaller servant's houses burnt right down. Most of the household belongings could be removed before the fire consumed the houses, but these were then kept “safe” in the church, as had been done during the 1911 fire. The householders then had to watch helplessly as their chattels, too, went up in smoke along with the church when the fire reached it.

== Politics ==
=== Municipal council ===
The council is made up of 12 council members, who were elected by majority vote at the municipal election held on 7 June 2009, and the honorary mayor as chairman.

=== Mayor ===
Kempfeld's mayor is Horst Albohr.

=== Coat of arms ===
The German blazon reads: In schräggeteiltem Schild vorn in Grün ein goldener gezinnter Turm auf einem silbernen Dreiberg, hinten in Gold ein blaubewehrter und -gezungter roter Löwe.

The municipality's arms might in English heraldic language be described thus: Per bend vert a tower embattled Or on a mount of three in base argent and Or a lion rampant gules armed and langued azure.

The tower on the dexter (armsbearer's right, viewer's left) side refers to the former keep on the Wildenburgkopf. The mount of three, a charge called a Dreiberg in German heraldry, symbolizes the Wildenburgkopf – a mountain – itself, which is under conservational protection. The lion on the sinister (armsbearer's left, viewer's right) side is a reference to the village's former allegiance to the Waldgraviate-Rhinegraviate.

== Culture and sightseeing ==
=== Buildings ===
==== Kempfeld (main centre) ====
The following are listed buildings or sites in Rhineland-Palatinate’s Directory of Cultural Monuments:

- Evangelical church, Hauptstraße 15 – slantwise-oriented Art Nouveau aisleless church with west tower, 1912, architect August Senz, Düsseldorf
- Hauptstraße, graveyard – various gravestones, among others J. V. Oberheim's grave slab, 1768; family Fuchs's sculpted tomb, M. E. Fuchs's grave stele, 1902
- Herrsteinerstraße 2 – stately Baroque house, partly timber-frame (slated), half-hipped roof, marked 1763
- Forester's house, south of the village – asymmetrical, many-winged building, Swiss chalet style and Expressionist motifs, early 20th century
- Wildenburg, south of the village (monumental zone) – founded in 1328 by Waldgrave Friedrich von Kyrburg, a Waldgravial-Rhinegravial Amtmann's seat; preserved foundations and remnants of a cistern of the upper castle, the former lower castle newly built beginning in 1859: gatetower, former forester's house (partly timber-frame, mansard roof), barn, low commercial building

==== Katzenloch ====
- Katzenloch 12 – hotel and inn; blocklike building, many-winged roofscape, early 20th century
- Katzenloch 20 – former hammermill; two overshot waterwheels used by the mill from 1758 to 1870/1872

Also found in the municipality are an open game reserve on the Wildenburger Kopf, and Germany's only gemstone garden on Schulstraße.

== Economy and infrastructure ==
=== Education ===
Kempfeld has one kindergarten, one primary school and one regional school on the way out of the village going towards the Wildenburg.

== Famous people ==
- Hans König (1916–1999), German politician (SPD), was from 1948 to 1957 mayor of the Amt of Kempfeld
- Helmut Träbert (1920–1974), German physician and scientist, lived and practised in Kempfeld
