= Sonnschied =

- Municipality
- Coat of arms

- Location of Sonnschied within Birkenfeld district
- Interactive map of Sonnschied
- Location within Germany Location within Rhineland-Palatinate
- Coordinates: 49°49′16″N 07°23′23″E
- Country: Germany
- State: Rhineland-Palatinate
- District: Birkenfeld
- Municipal assoc.: Herrstein-Rhaunen

Government
  - Mayor (2019–24): Bernhard Bender

Area
  - Total: 3.85 km^{2} (1.49 sq mi)
- Elevation: 400 m (1,300 ft)

Population (2025-12-31)
  - Total: 132
  - Density: 34.3/km^{2} (88.8/sq mi)
- Time zone: UTC+01:00 (CET)
  - Summer (DST): UTC+02:00 (CEST)
- Postal codes: 55758
- Dialling codes: 06785
- Vehicle registration: BIR
- Website: www.sonnschied.de

Sonnschied is an Ortsgemeinde – a municipality belonging to a Verbandsgemeinde, a kind of collective municipality – in the Birkenfeld district in Rhineland-Palatinate, Germany. It belongs to the Verbandsgemeinde Herrstein-Rhaunen, whose seat is in Herrstein.

== Geography ==
=== Location ===
The municipality lies in the southern Hunsrück at the edge of the Hahnenbach valley. From the village, there is an outstanding view of the Lützelsoon (a small, wooded, hill range).

=== Neighbouring municipalities ===
Sonnschied borders in the north on the municipality of Bundenbach, in the northeast on the municipality of Bruschied, in the east on the municipality of Hennweiler, in the southeast on the municipality of Hahnenbach, in the south on the municipality of Griebelschied and in the west on the municipality of Wickenrodt. Sonnschied also meets the municipality of Niederhosenbach at a single point in the southwest.

=== Constituent communities ===
Also belonging to Sonnschied is the outlying homestead of Birkenmühle.

== History ==
In 1336, Sonnschied had its first documentary mention. In the early 16th century, the village belonged to the Waldgraves and Rhinegraves and together with the neighbouring village of Wickenrodt formed a court region (Gericht). In 1515, Sonnschied was split from Wickenrodt by the second Waldgravial-Rhinegravial partition treaty. In the early 18th century, Sonnschied was held by the Counts of Sahn-Kyrburg, who were an offshoot of the Waldgraves and Rhinegraves.

In the 1727 contribution and taxation register, the number of names listed implies that there were only seven houses or households in the village then. These inhabitants, though, were the ones who built the Evangelical chapel in 1727-1729, which even today is still parochially bound to the parish of Wickenrodt.

In 1844 and 1845, the village underwent its first precise measurement. The surveyor noted that Sonnschied had at least three wells: one communal well and two private well facilities, each used by four or five families. As early as 1900 or thereabouts, households were supplied with running water, which flowed from an adit lying above the village.

In 1916 came electric light. Archival records also show that there was a small substation maintained in Sonnschied at that time by the local electric company, the Oberstein-Idarer Elektrizitätsgesellschaft.

Between 1995 and 1999, a thorough renovation of the whole village involving modernization of various infrastructural components was undertaken.

== Politics ==
=== Municipal council ===
The council is made up of 6 council members, who were elected by majority vote at the municipal election held on 7 June 2009, and the honorary mayor as chairman.

=== Mayor ===
Sonnschied’s mayor is Bernhard Bender.

== Culture and sightseeing ==
The following are listed buildings or sites in Rhineland-Palatinate’s Directory of Cultural Monuments:

- Evangelical church, Hauptstraße 9 – small aisleless church with ridge turret, 1728; décor
- Hauptstraße 8 – Quereinhaus (a combination residential and commercial house divided for these two purposes down the middle, perpendicularly to the street), partly timber-frame, marked 1868, essentially possibly older; characterizes village’s appearance
- Hauptstraße 12 – sandstone-framed brick building, marked 1909

== Economy and infrastructure ==
Running to the southeast of the municipality is Bundesstraße 41, which towards the south leads to the Autobahn A 62 (Kaiserslautern–Trier). Serving nearby Kirn is a railway station on the Nahe Valley Railway (Bingen–Saarbrücken).
