= Oberhosenbach =

- Municipality
- Coat of arms

- Location of Oberhosenbach within Birkenfeld district
- Interactive map of Oberhosenbach
- Location within Germany Location within Rhineland-Palatinate
- Coordinates: 49°48′52″N 07°19′53″E
- Country: Germany
- State: Rhineland-Palatinate
- District: Birkenfeld
- Municipal assoc.: Herrstein-Rhaunen

Government
  - Mayor (2019–24): Kirsten Beetz

Area
  - Total: 4.14 km^{2} (1.60 sq mi)
- Elevation: 430 m (1,410 ft)

Population (2025-12-31)
  - Total: 111
  - Density: 26.8/km^{2} (69.4/sq mi)
- Time zone: UTC+01:00 (CET)
  - Summer (DST): UTC+02:00 (CEST)
- Postal codes: 55758
- Dialling codes: 06785
- Vehicle registration: BIR

Oberhosenbach is an Ortsgemeinde – a municipality belonging to a Verbandsgemeinde, a kind of collective municipality – in the Birkenfeld district in Rhineland-Palatinate, Germany. It belongs to the Verbandsgemeinde Herrstein-Rhaunen, whose seat is in Herrstein.

== Geography ==
The municipality lies roughly 18 km north of Idar-Oberstein near the Deutsche Edelsteinstraße (“German Gem Road”) and the Hunsrück Schiefer- und Burgenstraße (“Hunsrück Slate and Castle Road”). Half the municipal area is wooded.

== History ==
In 1318, Oberhosenbach had its first documentary mention as Volmarshusenbach.

== Politics ==
=== Municipal council ===
The council is made up of 6 council members, who were elected by majority vote at the municipal election held on 7 June 2009, and the honorary mayor as chairwoman.

=== Mayor ===
Oberhosenbach's mayor is Kirsten Beetz, and her deputies are Reinhold Noll and Gabriele Wolter.

=== Coat of arms ===
The municipality's arms might be described thus: Per bend vert a cross Latin Or and Or a lion rampant gules armed and langued azure.

== Culture and sightseeing ==
The following are listed buildings or sites in Rhineland-Palatinate’s Directory of Cultural Monuments:

- Hauptstraße 9 – Quereinhaus (a combination residential and commercial house divided for these two purposes down the middle, perpendicularly to the street), Firstständer building, 1696
- Hauptstraße 34 – Quereinhaus, 1903; bakehouse typical of the time of building

== Economy and infrastructure ==
Running south of the municipality is Bundesstraße 41. Serving nearby Fischbach is a railway station on the Nahe Valley Railway (Bingen–Saarbrücken).
