= Wickenrodt =

- Municipality
- Coat of arms

- Location of Wickenrodt within Birkenfeld district
- Interactive map of Wickenrodt
- Location within Germany Location within Rhineland-Palatinate
- Coordinates: 49°48′58″N 07°21′33″E
- Country: Germany
- State: Rhineland-Palatinate
- District: Birkenfeld
- Municipal assoc.: Herrstein-Rhaunen

Government
  - Mayor (2019–24): Michael Adam

Area
  - Total: 5.27 km^{2} (2.03 sq mi)
- Elevation: 397 m (1,302 ft)

Population (2025-12-31)
  - Total: 160
  - Density: 30/km^{2} (79/sq mi)
- Time zone: UTC+01:00 (CET)
  - Summer (DST): UTC+02:00 (CEST)
- Postal codes: 55758
- Dialling codes: 06785
- Vehicle registration: BIR
- Website: www.wickenrodt.de

Wickenrodt is an Ortsgemeinde – a municipality belonging to a Verbandsgemeinde, a kind of collective municipality – in the Birkenfeld district in Rhineland-Palatinate, Germany. It belongs to the Verbandsgemeinde Herrstein-Rhaunen, whose seat is in Herrstein.

== Geography ==
=== Location ===
The municipality lies in the Hunsrück on a plateau overlooking the Hahnenbach valley between Idar-Oberstein and Rhaunen.

=== Neighbouring municipalities ===
Wickenrodt borders in the north on the municipality of Bollenbach, in the northeast on the municipality of Bundenbach, in the east on the municipality of Sonnschied, in the south on the municipality of Niederhosenbach, in the southwest on the municipalities of Breitenthal and Oberhosenbach and in the northwest on the municipality of Sulzbach. Wickenrodt also meets the municipality of Griebelschied at a single point in the southeast.

== Politics ==
=== Municipal council ===
The council is made up of 6 council members, who were elected by majority vote at the municipal election held on 7 June 2009, and the honorary mayor as chairman.

=== Mayor ===
Wickenrodt's mayor is Michael Adam.

=== Coat of arms ===
The municipality's arms might be described thus: Per bend vert a stylized W and in base an adze in bend argent, and Or a lion rampant gules armed and langued azure.

== Culture and sightseeing ==
=== Buildings ===
The following are listed buildings or sites in Rhineland-Palatinate’s Directory of Cultural Monuments:

- Evangelical parish church, Unterdorf – aisleless church; nave essentially Romanesque, alterations in the 18th and 19th centuries; Romanesque quire tower with Late Gothic pointed spire; two bells: one about 1340 by Magister Sifride, Cologne, the newer one marked 1466
- Unterdorf 8 – Evangelical rectory; Classicist building with hipped roof, 1840s

=== Regular events ===
Each year, the Wickenrodt Beautification Club (Verschönerungsverein Wickenrodt) stages a folk and children's festival (last weekend in July), and the Wickenrodt Riding Club (Reitverein RV Wickenrodt) holds a riding tournament (first weekend in September).

Every other year (in even-numbered years), Saint Nicholas’s Market (Nikolausmarkt) takes place around the municipal centre on the first Saturday in December.

== Economy and infrastructure ==
=== Transport ===
Running to the southeast of the municipality is Bundesstraße 41, which towards the south leads to the Autobahn A 62 (Kaiserslautern–Trier). Serving nearby Kirn is a railway station on the Nahe Valley Railway (Bingen–Saarbrücken).
