= Kirschweiler =

- Municipality
- Coat of arms

- Location of Kirschweiler within Birkenfeld district
- Interactive map of Kirschweiler
- Location within Germany Location within Rhineland-Palatinate
- Coordinates: 49°45′22″N 07°14′32″E
- Country: Germany
- State: Rhineland-Palatinate
- District: Birkenfeld
- Municipal assoc.: Herrstein-Rhaunen

Government
  - Mayor (2019–24): Karl-Otto Dreher

Area
  - Total: 4.88 km^{2} (1.88 sq mi)
- Elevation: 445 m (1,460 ft)

Population (2025-12-31)
  - Total: 1,024
  - Density: 210/km^{2} (543/sq mi)
- Time zone: UTC+01:00 (CET)
  - Summer (DST): UTC+02:00 (CEST)
- Postal codes: 55743
- Dialling codes: 06781
- Vehicle registration: BIR
- Website: www.kirschweiler.de

Kirschweiler is an Ortsgemeinde – a municipality belonging to a Verbandsgemeinde, a kind of collective municipality – in the Birkenfeld district in Rhineland-Palatinate, Germany. It belongs to the Verbandsgemeinde Herrstein-Rhaunen, whose seat is in Herrstein.

== Geography ==
=== Location ===
The municipality lies a few kilometres northwest of Idar-Oberstein in the Hunsrück. The municipal area is 56% wooded.

=== Neighbouring municipalities ===
Kirschweiler's neighbours besides Idar-Oberstein are Hettenrodt and Kempfeld with its outlying centre of Katzenloch.

=== Constituent communities ===
Also belonging to Kirschweiler are the outlying homesteads of Auf der Lüh und Kirschweiler Mühle.

== History ==
In 1272, Kirschweiler had its first documentary mention.

== Politics ==
=== Municipal council ===
The council is made up of 16 council members, who were elected by majority vote at the municipal election held on 7 June 2009, and the honorary mayor as chairman.

=== Mayor ===
Kirschweiler's mayor is Karl-Otto Dreher.

=== Coat of arms ===
The municipality's arms might in English heraldic language be described thus: Per bend azure a diamond with one row of brilliants and Or a lion rampant gules armed and langued of the first.

== Culture and sightseeing ==
=== Buildings ===
The following are listed buildings or sites in Rhineland-Palatinate’s Directory of Cultural Monuments:

- Evangelical church, Schulstraße – aisleless church with ridge turret, armorial stone, 1739/1740; two bronze bells, 1924
- Hauptstraße, graveyard – three older gravestones (1855, about 1910, 1920)
- Hauptstraße 22 – villalike Late Historicist residential and commercial house
- Hauptstraße 27 – house with knee wall, about 1910; gem-cutting workshop
- Schulstraße 8 – former school; Baroque Revival building with hipped roof, portal risalto, ridge turret, 1910-1924
- Across from Tampelstraße 8 – gem-cutting shop, about 1910; equipment partly preserved

Kirschweiler offers, among other things, a few gem-cutting shops that can be visited, a vast golf course (Golf Club Edelstein Hunsrück e.V.) and two gemstone fountains in the village centre.

=== Regular events ===
Each year, Kirschweiler holds the Burekirb (a fair).

=== Clubs ===
Among Kirschweiler’s clubs are TuS Kirschweiler (with football, among other things), MGV Kirschweiler (men’s singing club) and SV Kirschweiler (shooting).

Zur Vereinsstruktur in Kirschweiler gehören der TuS Kirschweiler (u.a. Fußball), der MGV Kirschweiler (Gesangsverein), der SV Kirschweiler (Schützenverein), u.v.m..

== Economy and infrastructure ==
The wealth of water in the Idarbach, which flows through the valley here was the basis for the village’s development into the “Village of the Gemstone Grinders”. Even today, Kirschweiler's economic life is characterized by gemstone grinders’ and goldsmiths’ businesses. Defining landmarks in the municipality are the two gemstone fountains in the village centre and the crystal fountain at Hans-Becker-Halle.

On Kirschweiler's outskirts is a seniors’ home sponsored by the Elisabeth-Stiftung (“Elisabeth Foundation”, named after Princess Elisabeth of Saxe-Altenburg) with 63 places and a further 6 places for assisted living.
