= Berschweiler bei Kirn =

- Municipality
- Coat of arms

- Location of Berschweiler bei Kirn within Birkenfeld district
- Interactive map of Berschweiler bei Kirn
- Location within Germany Location within Rhineland-Palatinate
- Coordinates: 49°46′14″N 07°23′28″E
- Country: Germany
- State: Rhineland-Palatinate
- District: Birkenfeld
- Municipal assoc.: Herrstein-Rhaunen

Government
  - Mayor (2019–24): Hubert Paal

Area
  - Total: 7.55 km^{2} (2.92 sq mi)
- Elevation: 415 m (1,362 ft)

Population (2025-12-31)
  - Total: 265
  - Density: 35.1/km^{2} (90.9/sq mi)
- Time zone: UTC+01:00 (CET)
  - Summer (DST): UTC+02:00 (CEST)
- Postal codes: 55608
- Dialling codes: 06752
- Vehicle registration: BIR

Berschweiler bei Kirn (German pronunciation: [ˈbɛʁʃvaɪlɐ baɪ ˈkɪʁn], lit. 'Berschweiler near Kirn') is an Ortsgemeinde – a municipality belonging to a Verbandsgemeinde, a kind of collective municipality – in the Birkenfeld district in Rhineland-Palatinate, Germany. It belongs to the Verbandsgemeinde Herrstein-Rhaunen, whose seat is in Herrstein. Berschweiler bei Kirn is one of two municipalities in the district with the name Berschweiler. The two are distinguished from each other by their geographical “tags”; the other one is called Berschweiler bei Baumholder.

== Geography ==
=== Location ===
The municipality lies west of the Nahe between Kirn and Herrstein. Berschweiler bei Kirn lies roughly 8 km north of Idar-Oberstein and 5 km west of Kirn. Almost half the municipal area is wooded.

=== Land use ===
As of 31 December 2010, Berschweiler's 7.53 km^{2} were by use apportioned thus:

- Agriculture 44.2%
- Woodland 48.4%
- Open water 0.2%
- Settlement and transport 6.9%
- Other 0.2%

== Politics ==
=== Municipal council ===
The council is made up of 6 council members, who were elected by majority vote at the municipal election held on 7 June 2009, and the honorary mayor as chairman.

=== Mayor ===
Berschweiler's mayor is Hubert Paal.

=== Coat of arms ===
The municipality's arms might be described thus: Per bend azure a bear's head sinister erased Or langued gules and Or a lion rampant of the third armed and langued of the first.

The charge on the sinister (armsbearer's left, viewer's right) side is the lion borne as an heraldic device by the Waldgraves and Rhinegraves, who held the village in the Middle Ages. The charge on the dexter (armsbearer's right, viewer's left) side, a bear's head, is canting. “Bear” is Bär – both words are pronounced rather similarly – in German, which sounds like the first three sounds in “Berschweiler”.

The arms have been borne since 16 May 1962.

== Culture and sightseeing ==
=== Buildings ===
The following are listed buildings or sites in Rhineland-Palatinate’s Directory of Cultural Monuments:

- Evangelical church, Hauptstraße 3 – Gothic Revival yellow sandstone block building, 1866-1868, architect Scheepers, Simmern; décor
- Hauptstraße 21 – estate with buildings on three sides of a yard; house, partly timber-frame (plastered), marked 1830, commercial wings newer

=== Other sites ===
Berschweiler is on both the Hunsrück Schiefer- und Burgenstraße (“Hunsrück Slate and Castle Road”) and the Sirona-Weg, a road whose focus is on the region's Celtic-Roman heritage.

Between Berschweiler and Fischbach is the historic Fischbacher Kupferbergwerk, one of Germany's biggest and most important copper mines. To the south stands a memorial stone to the now vanished village of Staufenberg.

== Economy and infrastructure ==
=== Transport ===
To the southeast runs Bundesstraße 41. In Kirn is the nearest railway station. It lies on the Nahe Valley Railway (Bingen–Saarbrücken).
