= Niederwörresbach =

- Municipality
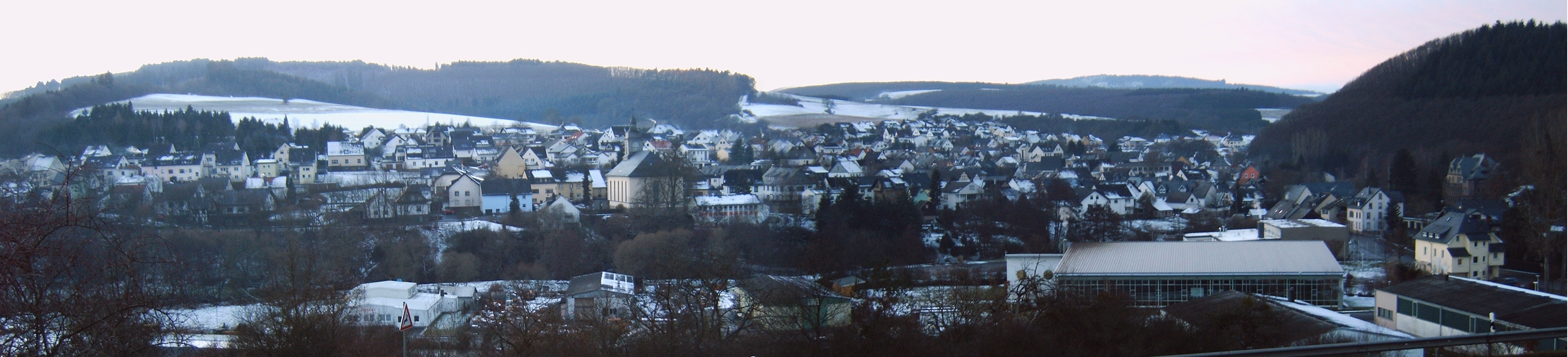

- Coat of arms

- Location of Niederwörresbach within Birkenfeld district
- Interactive map of Niederwörresbach
- Location within Germany Location within Rhineland-Palatinate
- Coordinates: 49°46′10″N 07°20′08″E
- Country: Germany
- State: Rhineland-Palatinate
- District: Birkenfeld
- Municipal assoc.: Herrstein-Rhaunen

Government
  - Mayor (2019–24): Ralf Juchem

Area
  - Total: 9.35 km^{2} (3.61 sq mi)
- Elevation: 290 m (950 ft)

Population (2025-12-31)
  - Total: 816
  - Density: 87.3/km^{2} (226/sq mi)
- Time zone: UTC+01:00 (CET)
  - Summer (DST): UTC+02:00 (CEST)
- Postal codes: 55758
- Dialling codes: 06785
- Vehicle registration: BIR
- Website: www.niederwoerresbach.de

Niederwörresbach is an Ortsgemeinde – a municipality belonging to a Verbandsgemeinde, a kind of collective municipality – in the Birkenfeld district in Rhineland-Palatinate, Germany. It belongs to the Verbandsgemeinde Herrstein-Rhaunen, whose seat is in Herrstein.

Niederwörresbach was shaped by the agate grinders' trade and the quarrying business. The local sport club's artistic gymnastics squad has earned international recognition.

== Geography ==
=== Location ===
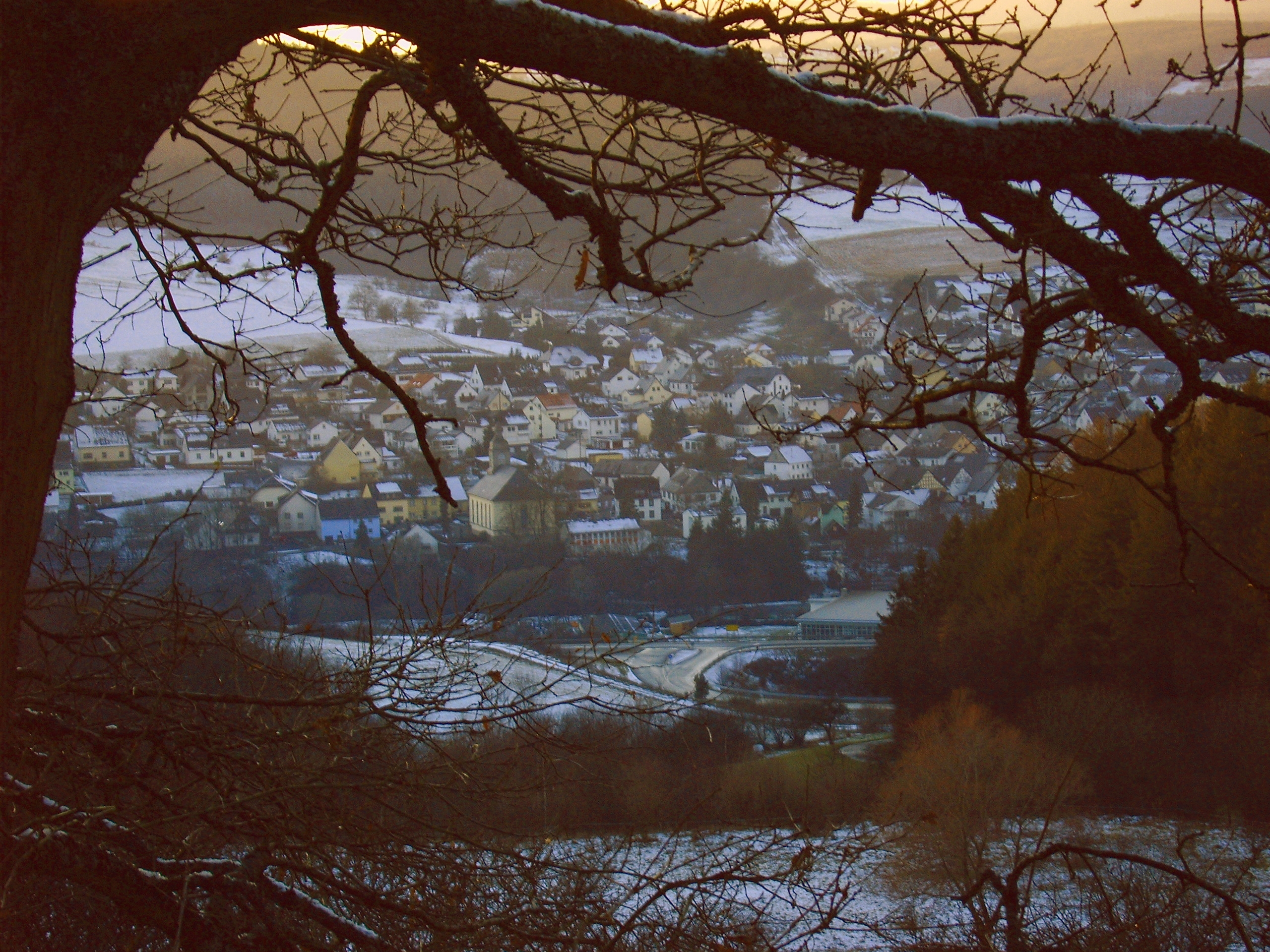
View from the Kehrwald

The village of the "clicker grinders" (Klickerschleifer – see explanation under The tradition of "clickers") lies between the southern edge of the Hunsrück and the mountain range of volcanic origin on the upper Nahe. It is part of the Fischbach valley, and on the municipal outskirts, the namesake river, the Wörresbach (also called the Hinterbach) empties into the Fischbach.

=== Neighbouring municipalities ===
Niederwörresbach borders in the north on Herrstein. Somewhat farther west is the slate ridge known as the Wirschheck, which leads on into the neighbouring municipality of Oberwörresbach. On Landesstraße (State Road) 160, Bundesstraße 41 can be reached, as can Fischbach some 7 km (4 mi) to the south, and indeed Idar-Oberstein's outlying centre of Weierbach. Also following this stretch of road is the Deutsche Edelsteinstraße ("German Gem Road"), which in Niederwörresbach's west follows Landesstraße 175 towards Herborn and Vollmersbach.

=== Constituent communities ===
Also belonging to Niederwörresbach are the outlying centres of Birfink and Hainbuch, and also the outlying homestead of "Auf Faustert".

=== Geology ===
Niederwörresbach is built on conglomerates from the Upper Rotliegend. This is permeated with igneous rocks such as porphyry and melaphyre. Going eastwards, the material changes over into the Devonian slate that characterizes the Rhenish Massif. Also worth mentioning here are the limonite stones on the "Wart" and a sandstone quarry on the "Klink". To this day, the firm F. L. Juchem & Söhne maintains, among other construction-related operations, a quarry along the road to Fischbach.

=== Climate ===
Niederwörresbach, which is part of the greater Nahe valley, has a relatively mild climate that, in principle at least, would even allow winegrowing, although the vineyard that once lay between Niederwörresbach and Oberwörresbach is now no longer under cultivation.

Yearly precipitation in Niederwörresbach amounts to 718 mm, which falls into the middle third of the precipitation chart for all Germany. At 44% of the German Weather Service's weather stations lower figures are recorded. The driest month is April. The most rainfall comes in November. In that month, precipitation is 1.4 times what it is in April. Precipitation varies only slightly, and is quite evenly spread throughout the year. Only at 1% of the weather stations are lower seasonal swings recorded.

== History ==
In 1047, when Niederwörresbach belonged to the Nahegau, it had its first documentary mention as a holding of the Counts of Sponheim. It was then that Count Eberhard von Sponheim endowed two farmsteads at Werngisbach. These were owned by the Sponheims until 1427, although from time to time they were pledged or redefined. Thereafter, the joint rulers were the Electorate of Trier, Baden and Palatinate-Simmern, until 1559. Baden then became the sole ruler, although for a time it was also jointly ruled along with the Princes of Zweibrücken, until in 1792, the French annexed the Rhine's left bank to their country. During this time, the village belonged to the Department of Sarre and the Canton and Mairie ("Mayoralty") of Herrstein. When German troops marched into France in 1814 and put an end to Napoleon's rule, Duke Peter Friedrich Ludwig of Oldenburg acquired the two exclaves of Lübeck and the Birkenfelder Land. The latter, in which Niederwörresbach lay, persisted right through Imperial times until the First World War, and although it then ceased to be the Principality of Birkenfeld within the Grand Duchy of Oldenburg, it nonetheless persisted as a "Free State" in the Weimar Republic. This came to an end on 1 April 1937 when the Nazis merged the exclave with Prussia within the framework of the Greater Hamburg Act in exchange for Wilhelmshaven.

=== Church ===
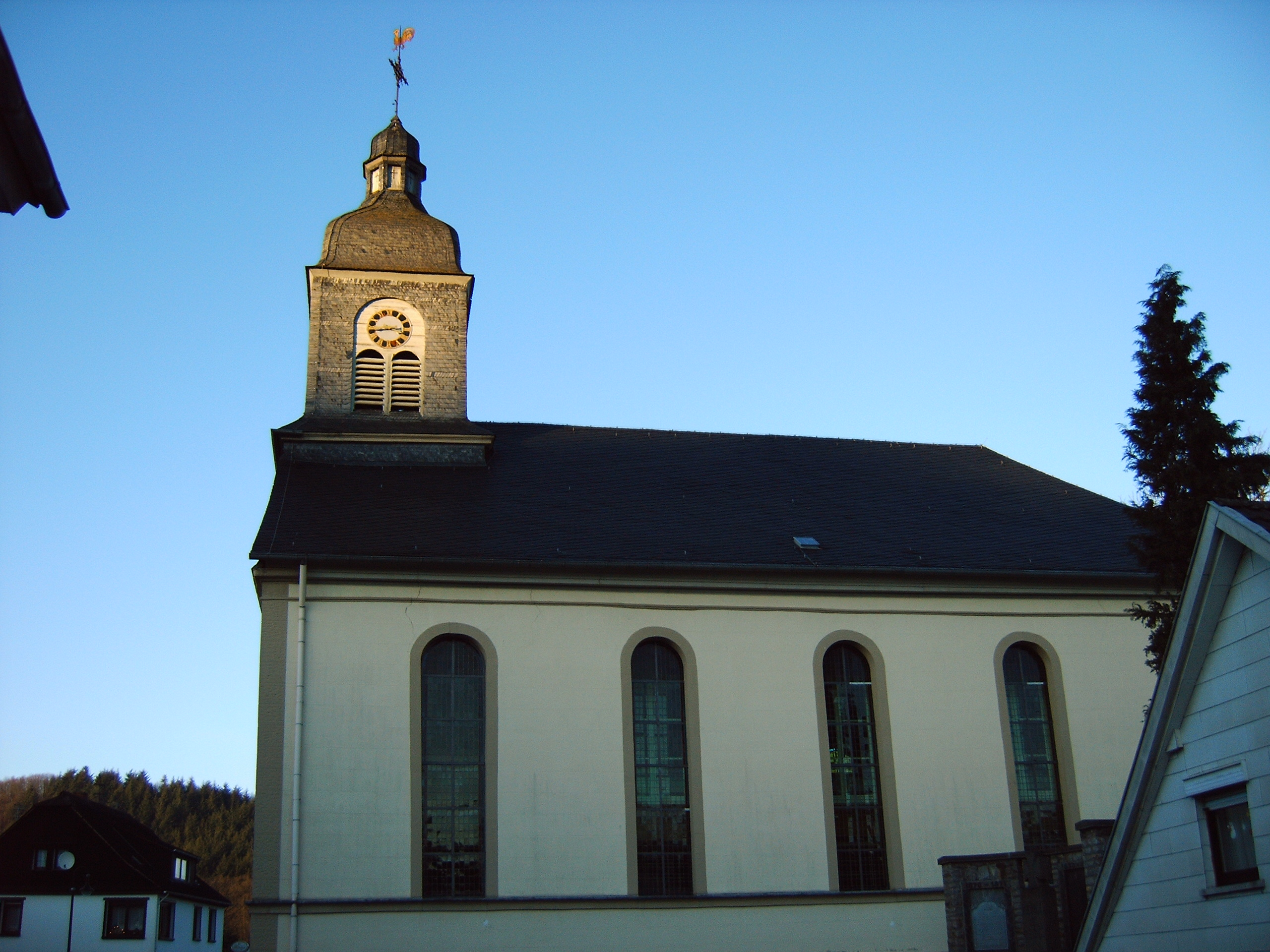
Church at Niederwörresbach

As early as 1560, the village had a parish seat with a branch in Fischbach. Later, Niederwörresbach became, like the whole surrounding area, Evangelical-Lutheran. The church that stands today was consecrated on 26 January 1833 by the Reverend Karl Phillip Daniel Koch. However, it turned out that masonry work on the tower had been botched by the builders, and in 1865, the tower had to be torn down. In its stead, a somewhat funny-looking cupola was built. This was, however, replaced with a new tower, which can still be seen today. The church is equipped with a Stumm organ.

=== The child and youth home ===
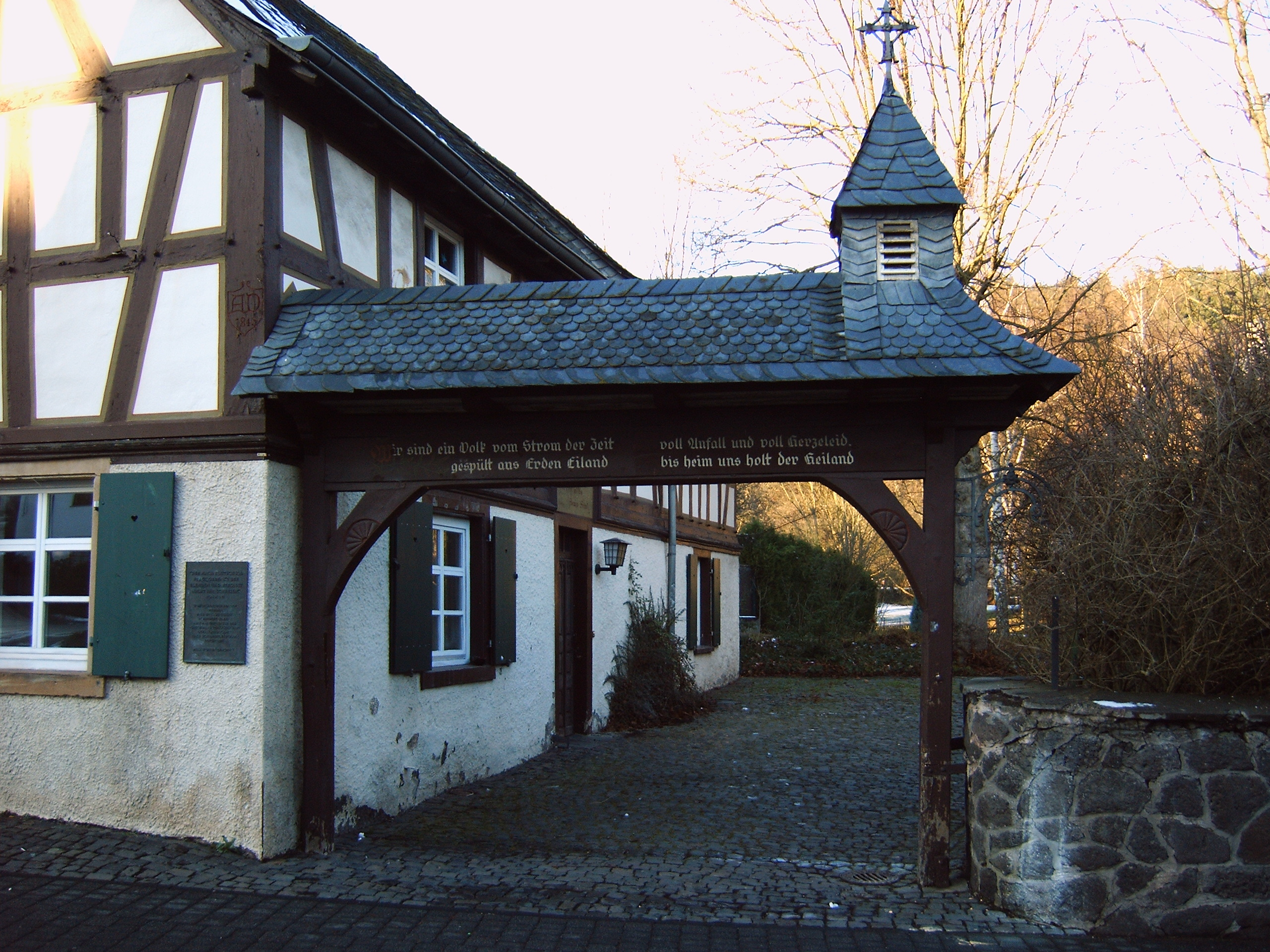
Portal

The 1830s and 1840s in the Birkenfelder Land were characterized by livestock plagues and bad harvests, leading to rising food prices and hunger. The Principality of Birkenfeld had to enact a law in 1842 dealing with public care of the poor to supply the poorest with their most basic needs. Soup kitchens were set up, wood was given away for free and potatoes were sold below the usual price.

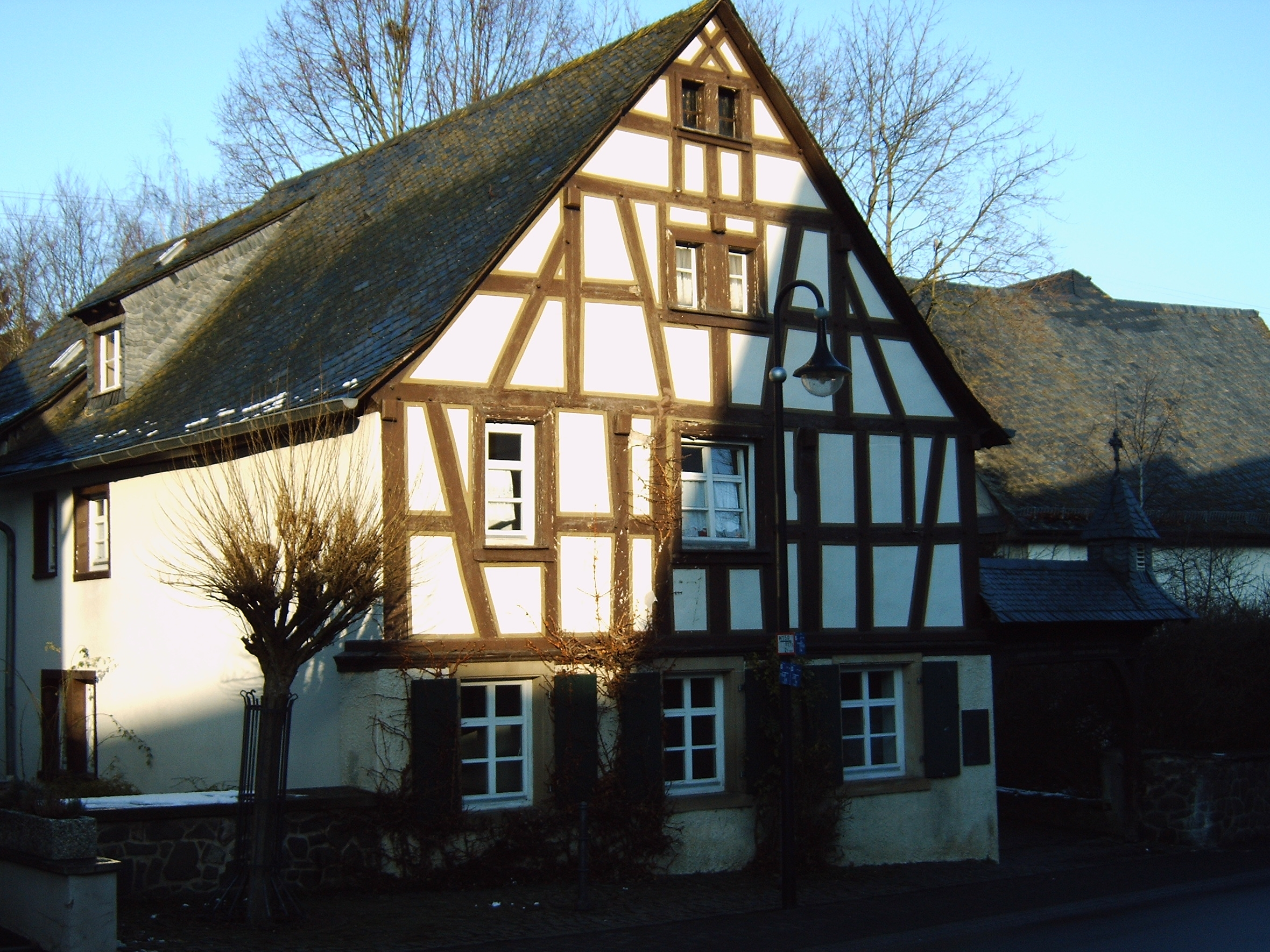
The child and youth home's original house

On 16 October 1846, the Reverend Friedrich Adolf Koch, a clergyman at Herrstein, originally from Niederwörresbach, established an educational home at his parents' house, a small farmhouse on the way towards Herrstein. He himself organized the financing for the home's necessary basic facilities by raffling donations in kind. Under the motto "Der Herr ist des Armen Schutz" (from Psalm 9:9, although this German translation literally means "The Lord is the poor man's shelter"), the first group of residents at the home were 18 girls. Maintenance costs were partly covered by the girls' handicrafts, which were raffled off, and collections, but there was always a debt of several hundred Thaler.

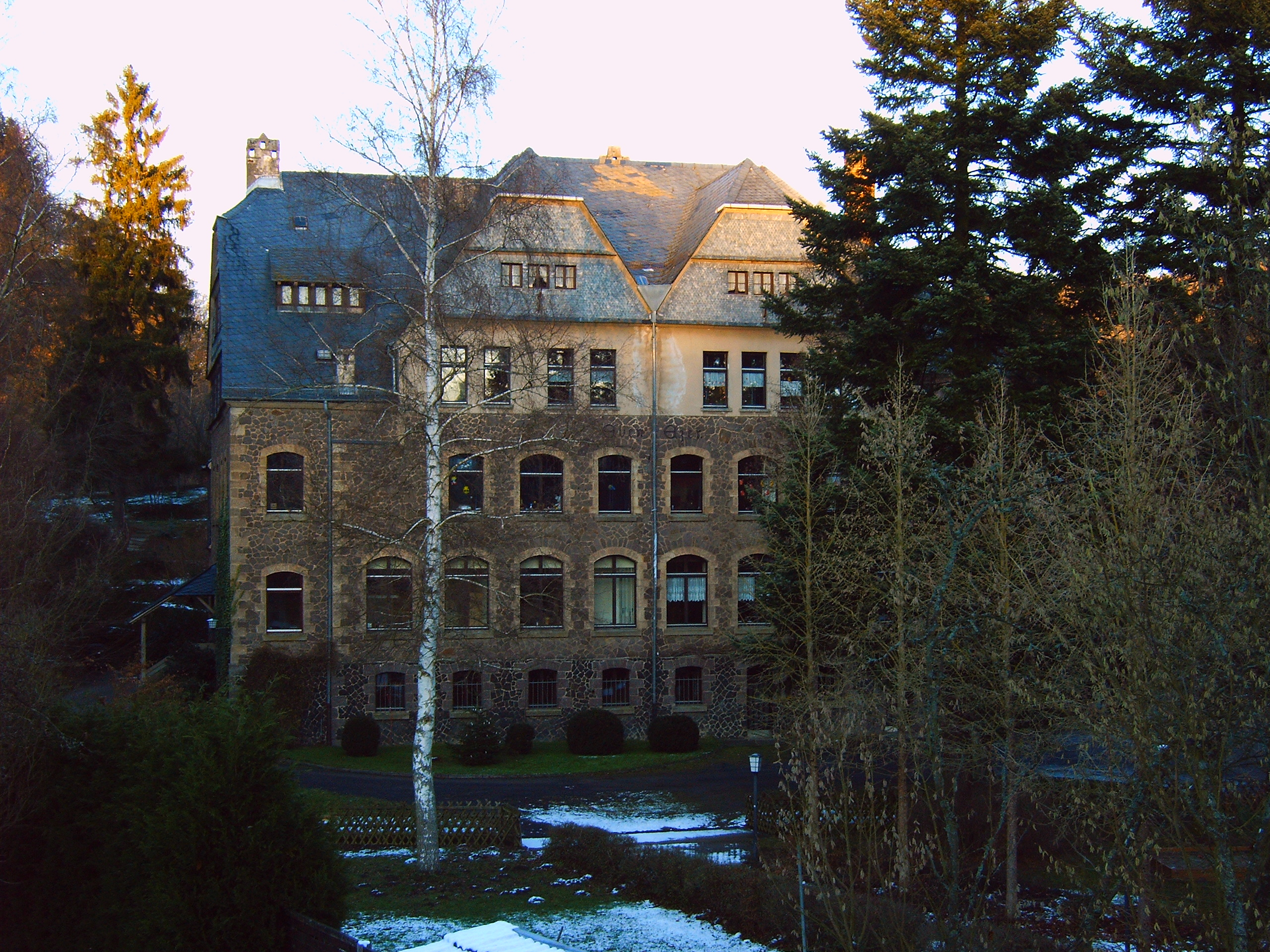
The child and youth home's main house

After the Reverend Koch's death in 1867, the only way to stop the home's closure in 1894 was by having the deaconess's Upper Rhine motherhouse take it over. The great, new main building was completed in 1905 and 1906, whereupon the original house was converted into a commercial building and communal dwellings. Moreover, in the 1980s a modern building with more dwellings and office space was built on the institute's grounds. Today the Deaconry of Kreuznach cares for youths at the home; former facilities for babies and the elderly have been given up to other institutions.

The village's appearance nowadays is predominantly characterized by the village square created in the 1980s and the new street, Ortsgemeindestraße, built in 1997 and 1998. This remodelling was made possible by the realignment of Landesstraße (State Road) 160, which now bypasses the village.

== Politics ==
=== Municipal council ===
The council is made up of 12 council members, who were elected by majority vote at the municipal election held on 7 June 2009, and the honorary mayor as chairman.

=== Mayor ===
Niederwörresbach's mayor is Ralf Juchem.

=== Coat of arms ===
The German blazon reads: Schild schräglinks geteilt, linke Seite in Silber und eine nach oben geöffnete Kette mit roten Klickersteinen, rechte Seite rot-silbern geschacht, belegt mit einem schwarzen Dreiberg.

The municipality's arms might in English heraldic language be described thus: Per bend sinister argent a chain of clicker stones open to dexter chief gules, and chequy gules and argent issuant from base a mount of three sable.

The chain of stones on the dexter (armsbearer's right, viewer's left) side refers to the local tradition of the "clicker grinders" (Klickerschleifer – see explanation under The tradition of "clickers"), while the "chequy" field on the sinister (armsbearer's left, viewer's right) side is a reference to the village's former allegiance to the County of Sponheim, and the mount of three – a charge called a Dreiberg in German heraldry – stands for the Amt within the County of Sponheim in which Niederwörresbach lay, namely Herrstein (whose name literally means "Lordstone"). Niederwörresbach even today lies in a Verbandsgemeinde of that same name.

== Culture and sightseeing ==
=== Buildings ===
The following are listed buildings or sites in Rhineland-Palatinate's Directory of Cultural Monuments:

- Evangelical church, Hauptstraße 6 – Classicist aisleless church, 1830–1833, architect Kondukteur Odernheimer; ridge turret 1907; Stumm organ 1850
- Near Hauptstraße 28 – former bakehouse, open roof frame, possibly from the latter half of the 19th century
- Hauptstraße 55, 57 – children's home of the Rhenish Deaconry; no. 55 gatekeeper's house, partly timber-frame, possibly from the latter half of the 18th century, conversion marked 1845, gateway with bell turret 1905; no. 57 children's home, quarrystone building, 1904/1905, architect August Senz, Düsseldorf
- Hohlstraße 37 – day labourer's house, one-floor house with stable underneath, possibly from about 1850/1860
- Mühlenweg 4 – so-called Litzenbergersche Mühle (mill); sandstone barn, 1877; three-floor brick mill building, 1910; stately house, 1914

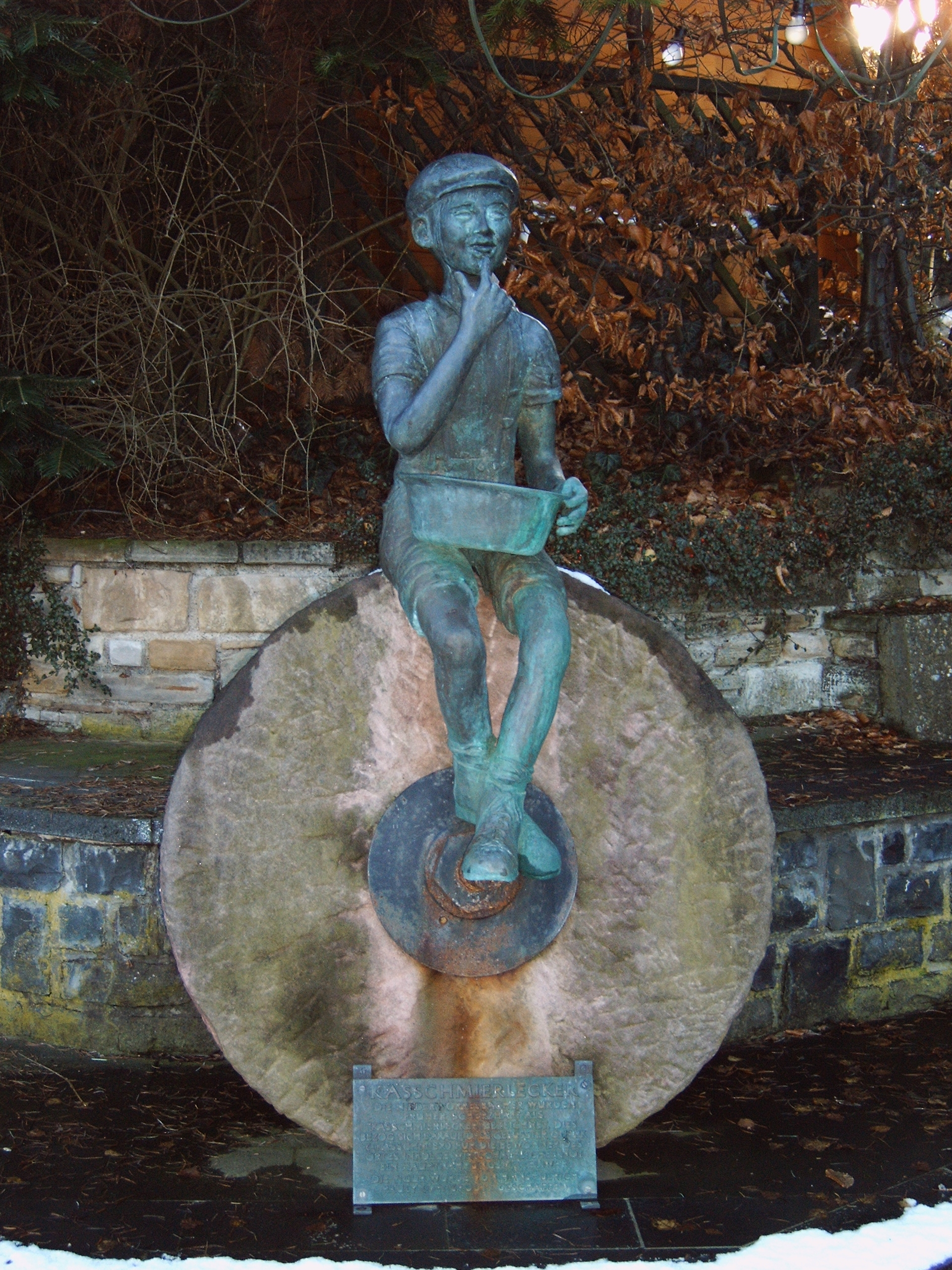
Der Kässchmierlecker

=== The tradition of "clickers" ===
Niederwörresbach has a long tradition in the craft of "clickers" (called Klicker in German). These are ball-shaped, polished agate stones. Agate grinding was an arduous job. The raw stones had to be brought to the village from Idar on foot so that they could be processed the next morning in the grinder's workshop. The so-called Schleiferkrankheit – "grinder's illness" – caused by agate dust, lying before the grindstone, poor ventilation and schnapps, which was drunk to suppress the affliction, saw to it that Klickerschliffer – "clicker grinders" – did not get older than 40 years. Bearing witness even today to their craft is a charge in the municipal coat of arms depicting a chain of these clickers.

=== Kässchmier ===
In bygone, harsher times, Kässchmier (roughly, "cheese smear") was cheap and generally considered tasty. It was a kind of quark mixed with herbs and sugar, and eaten as a spread or with jacket potatoes. Even today, people from Niederwörresbach are still jokingly called Werzbacher Kässchmierlecker by those from neighbouring places. A statue of the personification of the Kässchmierlecker has immortalized this image of Niederwörresbachers. It stands on the village square, which was remodelled in the 1980s.

=== Clubs ===
==== Sport club ====
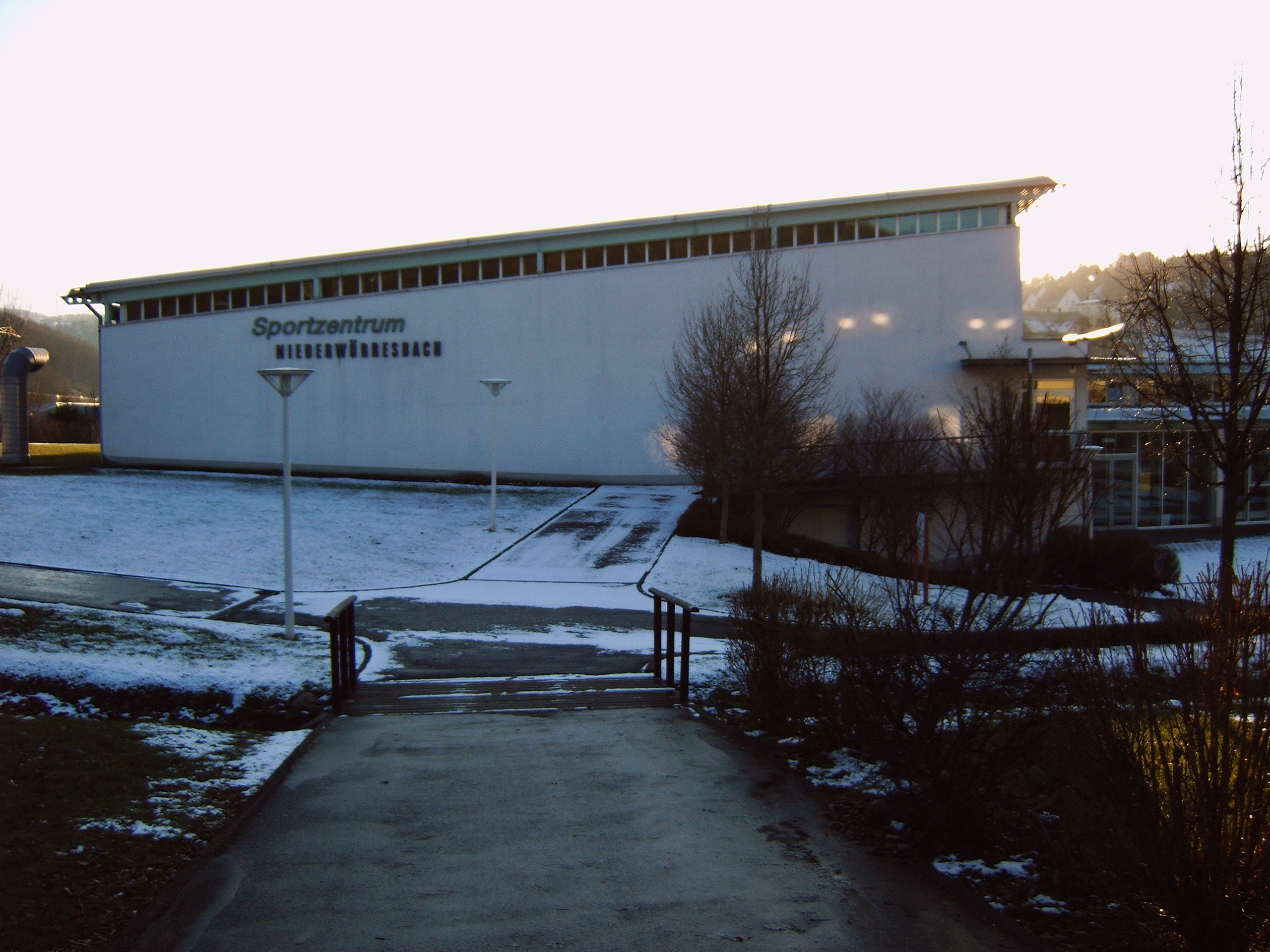
Activity centre for artistic gymnastics

The sport club, founded in 1888, has already managed to make a mark at national and international levels. The artistic gymnastics squad won many German championship titles in the 1970s and 1980s under coach Marianne Reimann. The highlight of the successes was the regional 1983 Sportswoman of the Year title earned by Niederwörresbach gymnast Heike Schwarm, along with her squad, which was recognized as Team of the Year. At the 1984 Summer Olympics in Los Angeles, SV Niederwörresbach – the sport club – furnished West Germany with one third of its squad in the persons of Heike Schwarm and Angela Golz. As part of a ceremonial act in Marianne Reimann's and her women gymnasts' honour at the Artistic Gymnastics Centre in Frankfurt on 20 January 1989, representatives of the Rhineland-Palatinate state government suggested building a "State Activity Centre for Artistic Gymnastics" in Niederwörresbach, whose great sport hall was finished in the early 1990s. The work was a joint effort with the Verbandsgemeinde. The successes continue: in 1997, Wladimir Klimenko became German Youth Champion in artistic gymnastics.

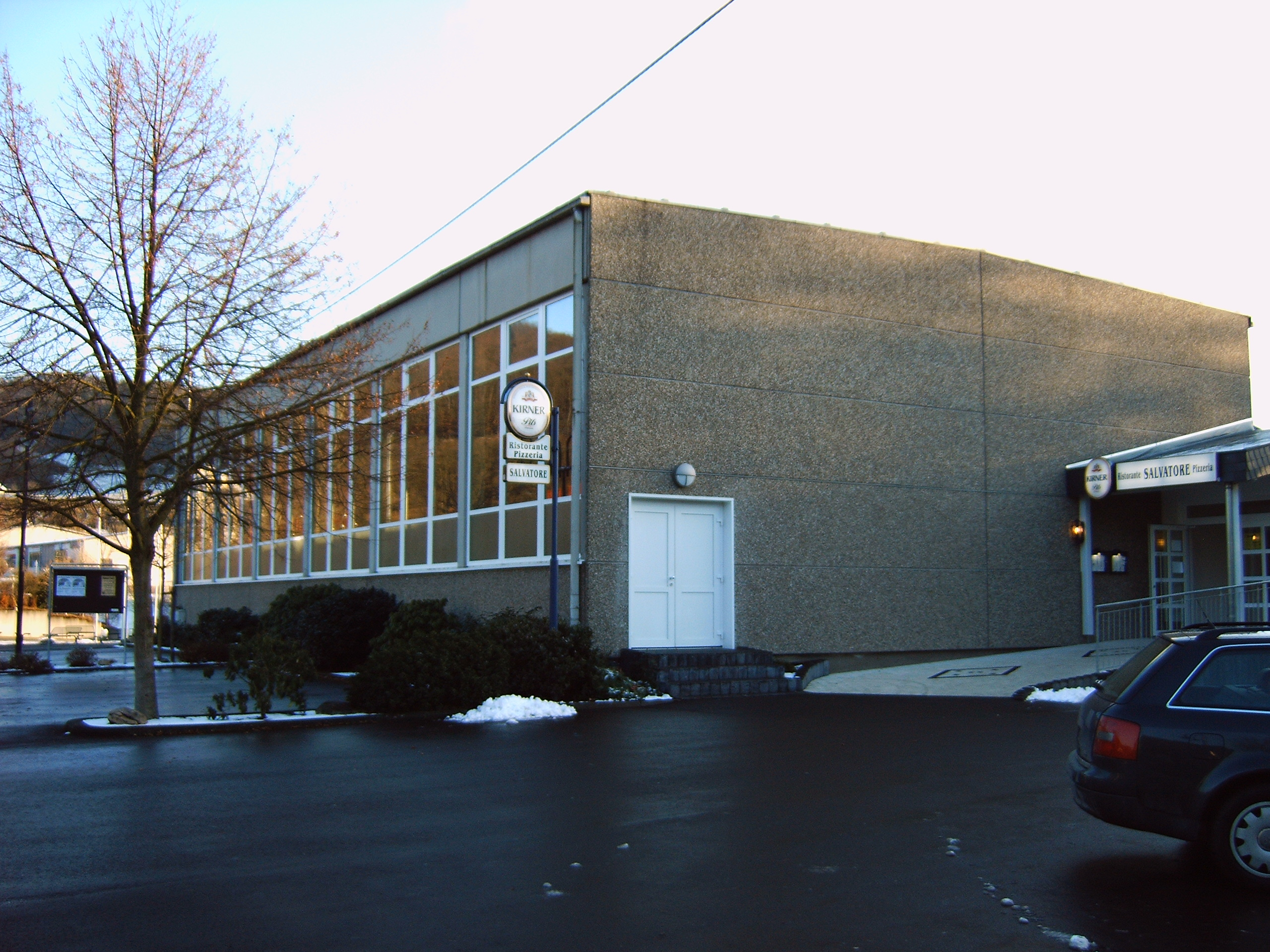
Multipurpose hall

Among the club's footballers, the "A-Youth" team is worthy of mention. This squad managed to reach the Bezirksliga level and eventually became 1977 Vice-Champions. A year later, Niederwörresbach's Michael Dusek moved to Bundesliga team 1. FC Kaiserslautern, with whom he stayed until the 1987/1988 season. Until 2006 he trained and coordinated the youth of "1. FCK." Currently, the first team plays in the Bezirksliga Nahe.

==== Music club ====
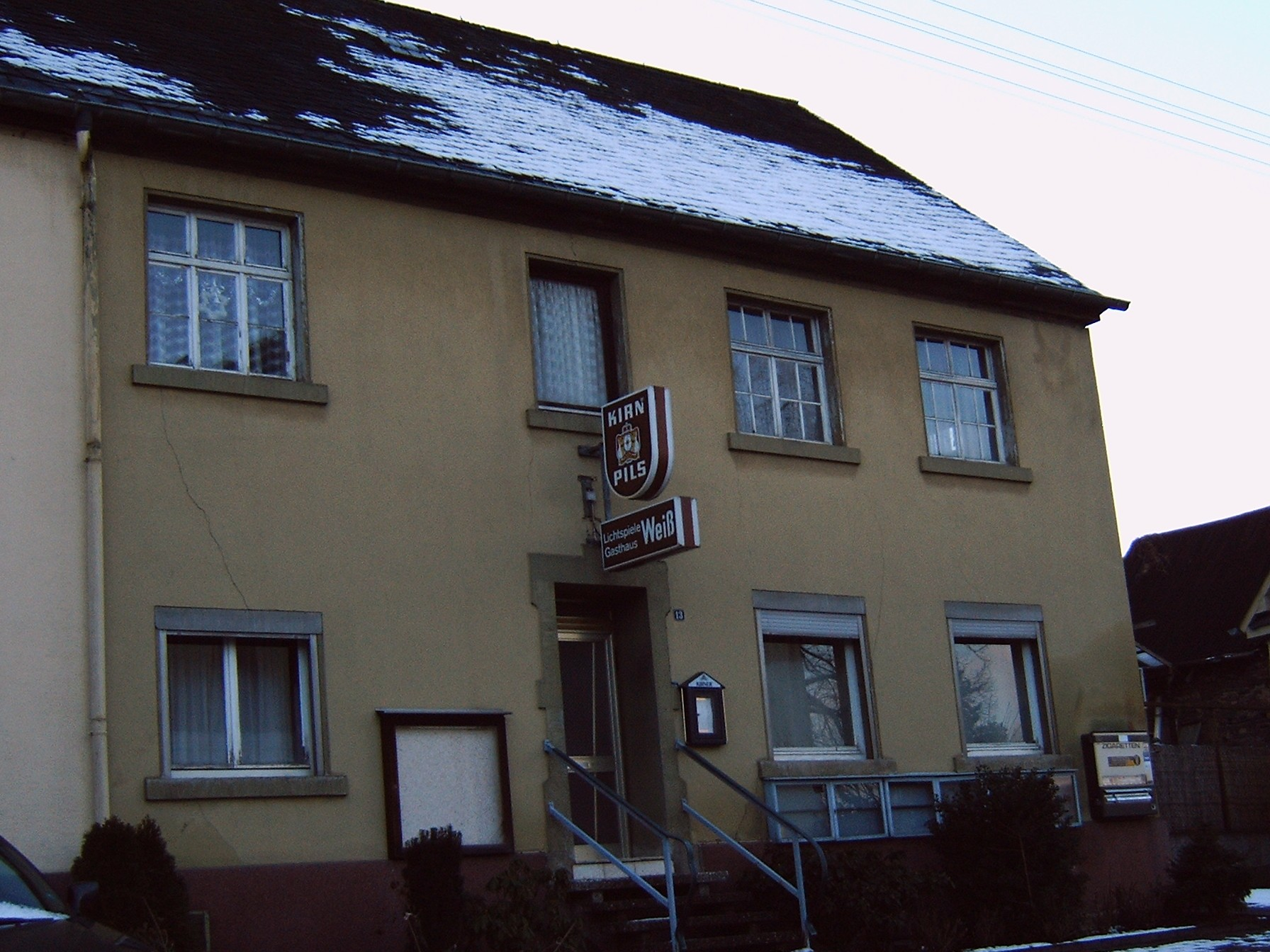
Gasthaus Weiß (inn)

The music club was founded on 9 September 1891 at the Gasthaus Weiß (inn) on the initiative of the first musical conductor, Emil Weiß. From 1911 until the end of the First World War, there was another music club in the village that called itself "Germania". Over its more than century-long history, the music club has set itself the task of fostering wind-instrument music and promoting culture in the municipality. In particular, its work with youth is worthy of mention.

==== Other clubs ====
Niederwörresbach's oldest club is the men's singing club, which came into being as a result of a proposal by the teacher Christian Schmidt in 1860. He also directed it until his death in 1890. In 1928, a mixed choir was established, which is linked to the club.

Niederwörresbach also has a volunteer fire brigade, founded in 1933, a local chapter of the German Red Cross, the marksmen's club, founded in 1975, and an angling club (since 1990). The Wanderfreunde e. V. Niederwörresbach (hiking club) split away from the sport club in 1992; it had formerly been a department of the sport club, founded in 1974.

== Famous people ==
=== Sons and daughters of the town ===
- Walter Brusius, German painter
- Michael Dusek, footballer and football coach

=== Famous people associated with the municipality ===
- Wiktor Jakowlewitsch Klimenko, artistic gymnast, Olympic medallist
- Larissa Petrik, artistic gymnast, Olympic medallist, coach, choreographer and trained actress

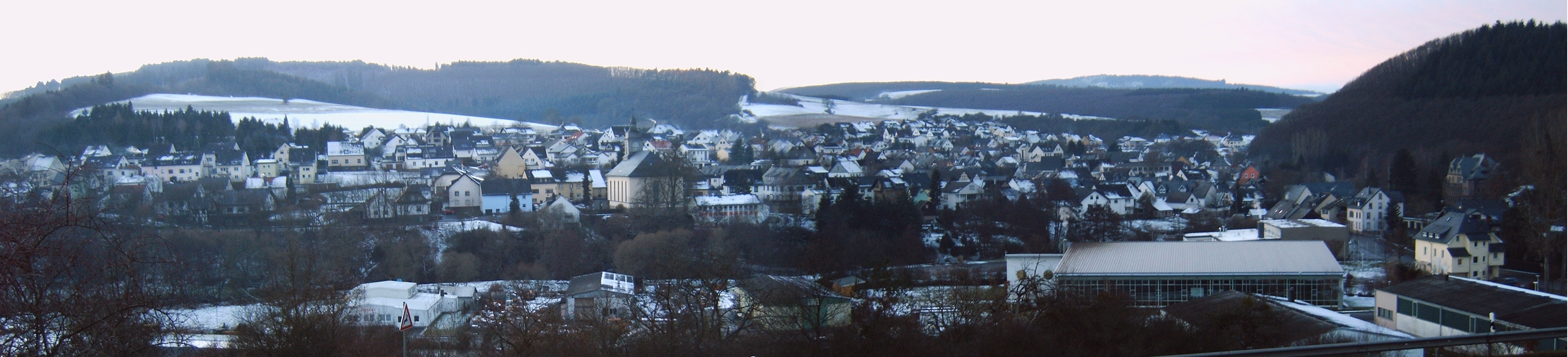
Blick über Niederwörresbach im Dezember 2005

== Sources ==
- Rudolf Becker, Beiträge zur Geschichte des Dorfes Niederwörresbach (Landkreis Birkenfeld) mit Illustrationen von Friedrich Heidrich, Niederwörresbach, Mitteilungen des Vereins für Heimatkunde im Landkreis Birkenfeld, Sonderheft 7, 1962, herausgegeben vom Verein für Heimatkunde im Landkreis Birkenfeld (Auszüge online)
- 950 Jahre Niederwörresbach, Festschrift zum 950-jährigen Jubiläum, herausgegeben von der Ortsgemeinde zur offiziellen Einweihung der Ortsgemeinderstraße und der Brücke über den Fischbach am 25., 26. und 27. Juni 1999 (Jubiläumsfeier wegen der umfassenden Umbauarbeiten um zwei Jahre verschoben)
- 100 Jahre SV Niederwörresbach 1888, Festwoche vom 24. Juni bis 2. Juli 1988, herausgegeben vom Verein.
