= Griebelschied =

- Municipality
- Coat of arms

- Location of Griebelschied within Birkenfeld district
- Interactive map of Griebelschied
- Location within Germany Location within Rhineland-Palatinate
- Coordinates: 49°48′04″N 07°24′01″E
- Country: Germany
- State: Rhineland-Palatinate
- District: Birkenfeld
- Municipal assoc.: Herrstein-Rhaunen

Government
  - Mayor (2019–24): Markus Hey

Area
  - Total: 4.19 km^{2} (1.62 sq mi)
- Elevation: 397 m (1,302 ft)

Population (2025-12-31)
  - Total: 167
  - Density: 39.9/km^{2} (103/sq mi)
- Time zone: UTC+01:00 (CET)
  - Summer (DST): UTC+02:00 (CEST)
- Postal codes: 55608
- Dialling codes: 06752
- Vehicle registration: BIR
- Website: www.griebelschied.de

Griebelschied is an Ortsgemeinde – a municipality belonging to a Verbandsgemeinde, a kind of collective municipality – in the Birkenfeld district in Rhineland-Palatinate, Germany. It belongs to the Verbandsgemeinde Herrstein-Rhaunen, whose seat is in Herrstein.

== Geography ==
=== Location ===
The municipality lies west of the Nahe between Kirn and Herrstein. Forty-three percent of the municipal area is wooded.

== History ==
In 1279, Griebelschied had its first documentary mention. In 1800, Schinderhannes (Johannes Bückler), an infamous outlaw, celebrated his “Robber’s Ball of Griebelschied”.

== Politics ==
=== Municipal council ===
The council is made up of 6 council members, who were elected by majority vote at the municipal election held on 7 June 2009, and the honorary mayor as chairman.

=== Mayor ===
Griebelschied's mayor is Markus Hey.

=== Coat of arms ===
The municipality's arms might be described thus: Per bend Or a lion rampant gules armed and langued azure, and vert an oakleaf bendwise slipped and a sprig of acorns bendwise sinister, the two per saltire in base and the whole of the first.

== Culture and sightseeing ==
The following are listed buildings or sites in Rhineland-Palatinate’s Directory of Cultural Monuments:

- Evangelical church, Hauptstraße – essentially a late mediaeval aisleless church with ridge turret; décor from the 18th century

== Economy and infrastructure ==
To the southeast runs Bundesstraße 41. Available in nearby Kirn is a railway station on the Nahe Valley Railway (Bingen–Saarbrücken).
