= Fischbach, Birkenfeld =

Fischbach
- Municipality
- Coat of arms

- Location of Fischbach within Birkenfeld district
- Interactive map of Fischbach
- Location within Germany Location within Rhineland-Palatinate
- Coordinates: 49°44′30″N 07°24′05″E
- Country: Germany
- State: Rhineland-Palatinate
- District: Birkenfeld
- Municipal assoc.: Herrstein-Rhaunen

Government
  - Mayor (2019–24): Michael Hippeli (SPD)

Area
  - Total: 4.01 km^{2} (1.55 sq mi)
- Elevation: 225 m (738 ft)

Population (2025-12-31)
  - Total: 912
  - Density: 227/km^{2} (589/sq mi)
- Time zone: UTC+01:00 (CET)
  - Summer (DST): UTC+02:00 (CEST)
- Postal codes: 55743
- Dialling codes: 06784
- Vehicle registration: BIR
- Website: www.fischbach-nahe.de

Fischbach (German pronunciation: [ˈfɪʃˌbax]) is an Ortsgemeinde – a municipality belonging to a Verbandsgemeinde, a kind of collective municipality – in the Birkenfeld district in Rhineland-Palatinate, Germany. It belongs to the Verbandsgemeinde Herrstein-Rhaunen, whose seat is in Herrstein.

== Geography ==
=== Location ===
The municipality lies in the southern Hunsrück on the river Nahe, near Idar-Oberstein and on the Deutsche Edelsteinstraße (“German Gem Road”). The Fischbach, coming from the Idar Forest, flows through the village.

== History ==
In 1438, Fischbach had its first documentary mention when the Counts of Sponheim, who until this time had been the local lords, died out. Thereafter, ownership was jointly held by the Margraves of Baden and the Counts of Veldenz. The Veldenzes' share was taken over in 1444 by Stephen, Count Palatine of Simmern-Zweibrücken and passed to his younger son Louis I, Count Palatine of Zweibrücken. Within the framework of a territorial swap in 1776, Fischbach became wholly Badish. From 1792 to 1814, the village was part of the French Department of Sarre. After the Congress of Vienna, it ended up with the Principality of Birkenfeld, and thereby with the Duchy of Oldenburg.

== Politics ==
=== Municipal council ===
The council is made up of 16 council members, who were elected by proportional representation at the municipal election held on 7 June 2009, and the honorary mayor as chairman.

The municipal election held on 7 June 2009 yielded the following results:

Year	SPD	CDU	Total
2009	11	5	16 seats
2004	11	5	16 seats

=== Mayor ===
Fischbach’s mayor is Michael Hippeli.

=== Coat of arms ===
The municipality’s arms might be described thus: Per fess chequy gules and argent and argent a hammer and pick per saltire sable.

The “chequy” part of the escutcheon refers to the old Counts of Sponheim who held sway here centuries ago, while the hammer and pick charge below recalls the copper mining that was the village’s livelihood for hundreds of years, shaping the people and the culture.

== Culture and sightseeing ==
=== Buildings ===
The following are listed buildings or sites in Rhineland-Palatinate’s Directory of Cultural Monuments:

- Evangelical parish church, Hauptstraße 93 – Gothic Revival red sandstone building, west tower, 1853-1855, architect Meyer, Birkenfeld; décor; in the vestibule a tomb slab, after 1720
- Hauptstraße 47 – so-called Fillmannsmühle (“Fillmann’s Mill”); three-floor quarrystone building with brick, 1924; technical equipment; waterwheel 1910
- Lindenplatz 1 – former miner’s house, house with stable on ground floor, timber-frame storey on quarrystone basement, possibly from the 16th or 17th century

There is a former copper mine, open as a tourist attraction with underground visits and crushing stamps powered by a water wheel.

== Economy and infrastructure ==
=== Transport ===
Fischbach has a stop on the Nahe Valley Railway (Bingen–Saarbrücken).

== Famous people ==
=== Sons and daughters of the town ===
- Paul Eisenschneider (b. 5 May 1901, d. 19 April 1944 at Mauthausen-Gusen concentration camp) – Communist social activist
- Elvira Eisenschneider (b. 22 April 1924, d. 6 April 1944 at Sachsenhausen concentration camp) – Paul’s daughter and fellow activist. Both were murdered by the Nazis.
