= Hochscheid =

- Municipality
- Coat of arms

- Location of Hochscheid within Bernkastel-Wittlich district
- Interactive map of Hochscheid
- Location within Germany Location within Rhineland-Palatinate
- Coordinates: 49°52′37″N 7°13′13″E
- Country: Germany
- State: Rhineland-Palatinate
- District: Bernkastel-Wittlich
- Municipal assoc.: Bernkastel-Kues

Government
  - Mayor (2019–24): Erhard Wolf

Area
  - Total: 15.39 km^{2} (5.94 sq mi)
- Elevation: 510 m (1,670 ft)

Population (2025-12-31)
  - Total: 253
  - Density: 16.4/km^{2} (42.6/sq mi)
- Time zone: UTC+01:00 (CET)
  - Summer (DST): UTC+02:00 (CEST)
- Postal codes: 54472
- Dialling codes: 06536
- Vehicle registration: WIL

Hochscheid is an Ortsgemeinde – a municipality belonging to a Verbandsgemeinde, a kind of collective municipality – in the Bernkastel-Wittlich district in Rhineland-Palatinate, Germany.

== Geography ==
=== Location ===
This rural municipality lies in the middle of low-mountain country in the Hunsrück, at the foot of the Idarkopf. Hochscheid belongs to the Verbandsgemeinde of Bernkastel-Kues, whose seat is in the like-named town.

=== Neighbouring municipalities ===
Neighbouring municipalities within a five-kilometre radius are Horbruch (1.19 km away as the crow flies), Wahlenau (3.02 km), Hirschfeld (3.02 km), Kleinich (3.03 km) and Krummenau (3.58 km). The nearest middle centre is Bernkastel-Kues.

== History ==
=== Antiquity ===
The most important sanctuary to the Gallic divinity Sirona stands in Hochscheid, where a Latin inscription “DEO APOLLINI ET SANCTE SIRONE” (Eng. "To the god Apollo and holy Sirona") can also be found, in which the Roman Apollo likely has been identified with the Celtic god Grannus through the Interpretatio Romana. Since Apollo and Diana were held to be siblings, this kinship is here transferred to Sirona and Apollo Grannus.

=== Medieval/Early Modern ===
Hochscheid belonged to the “Hinder” County of Sponheim. The first known chapel was already standing here by 1529. It was probably consecrated to Saint Giles. By 1743 this chapel had been destroyed, possibly in the Thirty Years' War. In 1752 the chapel was built anew, but by 1790, only the tower was still standing. Later, a “winter school” (Winterschule – a kind of agricultural school that grew up in response to the Industrial Revolution) was built onto the tower. Hanging in the chapel was a bell from 1629 with the inscription “Johann Burchart Trarbach Pfarher zu Clenich. Johann Schüßler Kirchenmeister. Anno MDCXXIX” (“Johann Burchart Trarbach clergyman at Cleinich. Johann Schüßler church father. In the year 1629”).

== Politics ==
=== Municipal council ===
The council is made up of 6 council members, who were elected by majority vote at the municipal election held on 7 June 2009, and the honorary mayor as chairman.

=== Coat of arms ===
The municipality's arms might be described thus: Vert in base water argent with ripples of the field, dexter a lyre of the second, leaning against which a laurel twig bendwise slipped in base Or.

The arms are derived from a Roman spring sanctum from the 2nd century unearthed high in the woods. It shows the spring god Apollo’s attributes, the lyre and the laurel, as well as springwater.

== Economy and infrastructure ==
Public transport in Hochscheid is integrated into the Verkehrsverbund Region Trier (VRT), whose fares therefore apply.
