= Horbruch =

- Municipality
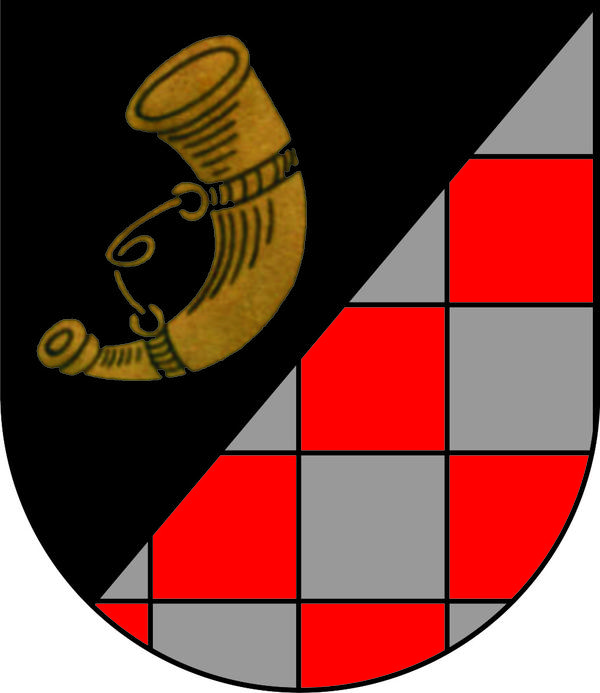
- Coat of arms

- Location of Horbruch within Birkenfeld district
- Interactive map of Horbruch
- Location within Germany Location within Rhineland-Palatinate
- Coordinates: 49°53′28″N 7°14′29″E
- Country: Germany
- State: Rhineland-Palatinate
- District: Birkenfeld
- Municipal assoc.: Herrstein-Rhaunen

Government
  - Mayor (2019–24): Klaus-Peter Hepp

Area
  - Total: 5.18 km^{2} (2.00 sq mi)
- Elevation: 455 m (1,493 ft)

Population (2025-12-31)
  - Total: 347
  - Density: 67.0/km^{2} (173/sq mi)
- Time zone: UTC+01:00 (CET)
  - Summer (DST): UTC+02:00 (CEST)
- Postal codes: 55483
- Dialling codes: 06543
- Vehicle registration: BIR
- Website: www.horbruch.de

Horbruch is an Ortsgemeinde – a municipality belonging to a Verbandsgemeinde, a kind of collective municipality – in the Birkenfeld district in Rhineland-Palatinate, Germany. It belongs to the Verbandsgemeinde Herrstein-Rhaunen, whose seat is in Herrstein.

== Geography ==
=== Location ===
The municipality lies in the Hunsrück northwest of the 746 m-high Idarkopf. The municipal area is 44.3% wooded, and its elevation is 460 m above sea level.

=== Neighbouring municipalities ===
Horbruch borders in the north on the municipality of Hirschfeld (Rhein-Hunsrück-Kreis), in the east on the municipality of Krummenau and in the west on the municipality of Hochscheid (Bernkastel-Wittlich district).

=== Constituent communities ===
Also belonging to Horbruch are the outlying homesteads of Bergmühle, Emmerichsmühle, Forsthaus Horbruch, Hockenmühle and Neumühle.

== History ==
Archaeological digs have been undertaken at a number of barrows in the cadastral area known as the Feldmark, up from the Marienmühle (mill), dating from protohistoric times. Unearthed here were grave goods in the form of remnants of cutting and thrusting weapons as well as a few almost intact pieces of jewellery in typical Celtic ornamental style. Moreover, over on the north slope of the Idar Forest, not three kilometres from the village, in the Koppelbach's headwaters, a temple, likewise from Celtic times, was dug up. This was dedicated to Sirona and was later expanded by the Romans in the 2nd century AD. Unearthed here were a votive altar and almost life-size statues of the healing goddess Sirona and the god Apollo Grannus. Once running by Horbruch's southern outskirts was the most important overland link between the Roman towns of Augusta Treverorum (Trier) and Moguntiacum (Mainz). Another road, Bundesstraße 327, also called the Hunsrückhöhenstraße (“Hunsrück Heights Road”), is a scenic road across the Hunsrück built originally as a military road on Hermann Göring’s orders; it runs parallel to the old Roman road.

== Politics ==
=== Municipal council ===
The council is made up of 8 council members, who were elected by majority vote at the municipal election held on 7 June 2009, and the honorary mayor as chairman.

=== Mayor ===
Horbruch’s mayor is Klaus-Peter Hepp.

=== Coat of arms ===
The German blazon reads: In schräglinks geteiltem Schild vorne in Schwarz ein goldenes Horn, hinten rot-silbernes Schach.

The municipality’s arms might in English heraldic language be described thus: Per bend sinister sable a bugle-horn bendwise sinister Or and chequy gules and argent.

The charge on the dexter (armsbearer’s right, viewer’s left) side, the horn, is drawn from Horbruch’s 18th-century court seal, whose original stamp is in private ownership in the municipality. It might also be a canting charge for the village’s name (“horn” is also Horn in German, as can be noted in the German blazon), but this is unclear. The “chequy” pattern on the sinister (armsbearer's left, viewer's right) side is a reference to the village's former allegiance to the “Hinder” County of Sponheim.

== Culture and sightseeing ==
=== Buildings ===
The following are listed buildings or sites in Rhineland-Palatinate’s Directory of Cultural Monuments:

- Kleinicher Weg 8 – fully slated house, late 19th century
- Oberdorf 3 – Quereinhaus (a combination residential and commercial house divided for these two purposes down the middle, perpendicularly to the street), partly timber-frame slated, marked 1867, expanded with commercial wings; whole complex
- Oberdorf 10 – timber-frame Quereinhaus (partly plastered), hipped mansard roof, about 1800; timber-frame commercial wing less old
- Unterdorf 1 – representative house, late 19th century
- Unterdorf 6 – community house, asymmetrical plastered building, 1928
- Unterdorf 8 – hook-shaped estate, about 1888; timber-frame building on solid pedestal, partly plastered or slated
- Bergmühle (mill), southeast of the village on the Altbach – stately Baroque building with mansard roof, marked 1804 (relocation), essentially possibly from the 16th century; millpond
- Marienmühle (mill), south of the village on the Altbach – timber-frame building, slated, on solid pedestal ground floor, technical equipment largely preserved, 19th century

== Economy and infrastructure ==
=== Public institutions ===
Horbruch has a kindergarten and a village community centre.

=== Transport ===
Serving Idar-Oberstein is a railway station on the Nahe Valley Railway (Bingen–Saarbrücken). To the north lie Bundesstraße 50 and Frankfurt-Hahn Airport.
