= Sirona =

Sirona may refer to

- Sirona (goddess), Celtic deity
- Sirona Dental Systems
- Sirona Care & Health, British community interest company
- 116 Sirona, main-belt asteroid
- Sirona Ryan, fictional character in the 2023 video game Hogwarts Legacy
- USS Sirona (1945-1966), American Navy ship
