= Krummenau =

- Municipality
- Coat of arms

- Location of Krummenau within Birkenfeld district
- Interactive map of Krummenau
- Location within Germany Location within Rhineland-Palatinate
- Coordinates: 49°53′30″N 7°16′30″E
- Country: Germany
- State: Rhineland-Palatinate
- District: Birkenfeld
- Municipal assoc.: Herrstein-Rhaunen

Government
  - Mayor (2019–24): Gerd Böhnke

Area
  - Total: 4.32 km^{2} (1.67 sq mi)
- Elevation: 400 m (1,300 ft)

Population (2025-12-31)
  - Total: 149
  - Density: 34.5/km^{2} (89.3/sq mi)
- Time zone: UTC+01:00 (CET)
  - Summer (DST): UTC+02:00 (CEST)
- Postal codes: 55483
- Dialling codes: 06543
- Vehicle registration: BIR

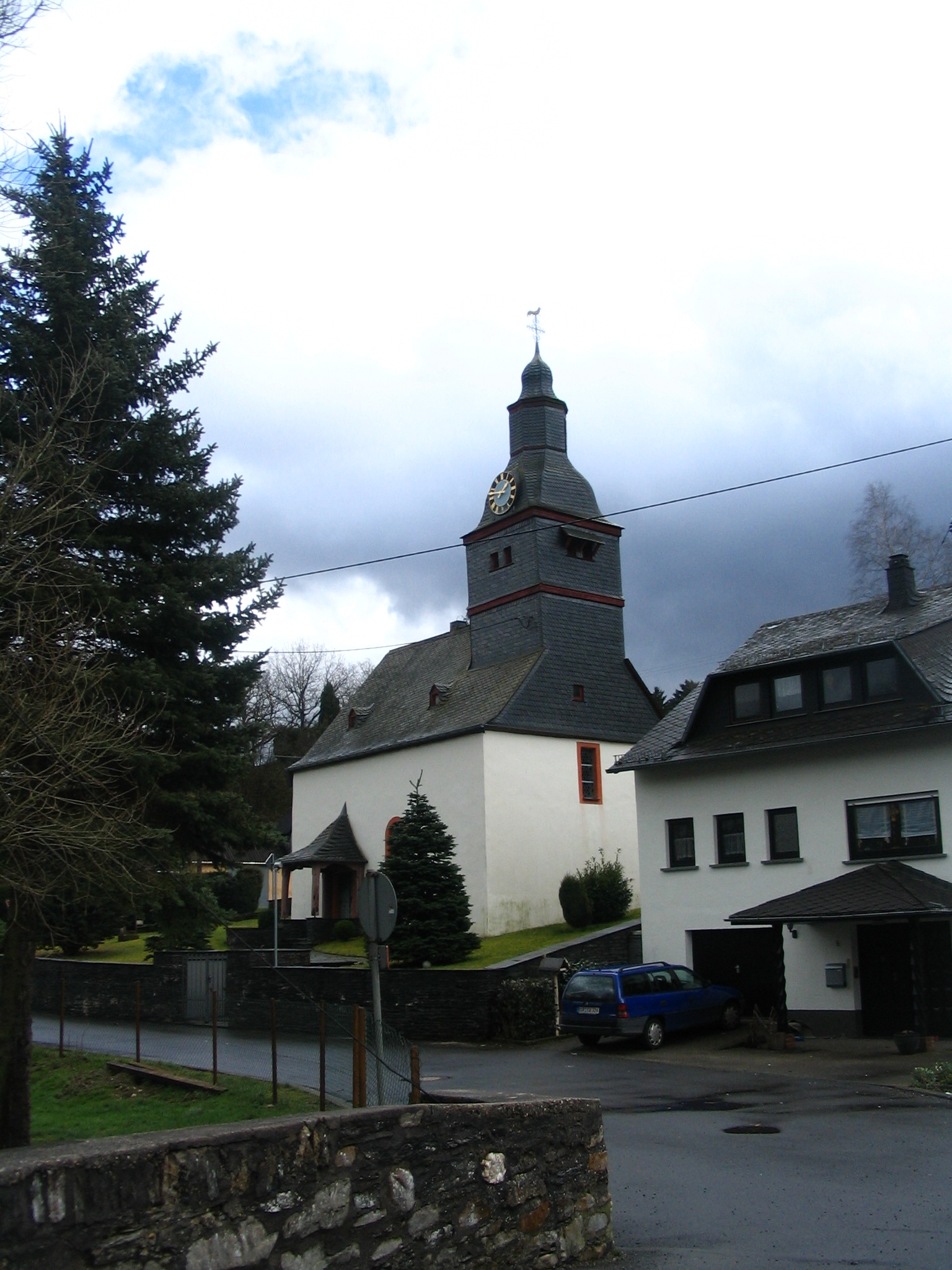
Krummenau's church

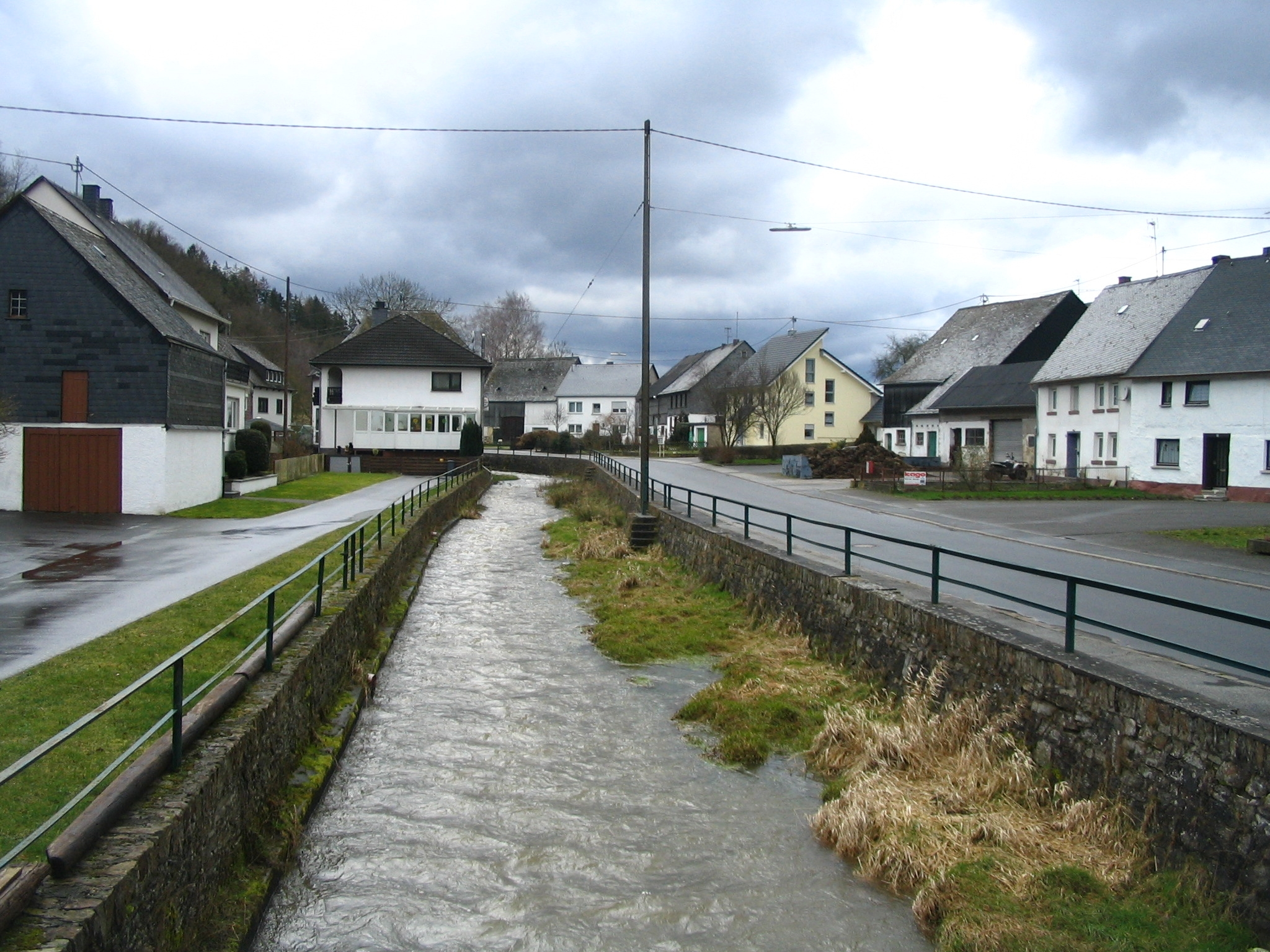
The Idarbach flows through the village.

Krummenau is an Ortsgemeinde – a municipality belonging to a Verbandsgemeinde, a kind of collective municipality – in the Birkenfeld district in Rhineland-Palatinate, Germany. It belongs to the Verbandsgemeinde Herrstein-Rhaunen, whose seat is in Herrstein.

== Geography ==
=== Location ===
The municipality lies in the Hunsrück north of the 746 m-high Idarkopf in the Idar Forest. The municipal area is 61.6% wooded. The Idarbach flows through the village.

=== Neighbouring municipalities ===
Krummenau borders in the north on the municipality of Niederweiler, in the east on the municipality of Laufersweiler and in the west on the municipality of Horbruch.

=== Constituent communities ===
Also belonging to Krummenau is the outlying homestead of Weylandsmühle.

== History ==
=== First documentary mention ===
On 20 November 1086, Krummenau had its first documentary mention in a donation document From Archbishop Wezilo. A manuscript from the late 18th century – kept at the archive of the Museum of Wasserburg-Anholt of the Prince of Salm-Salm in Isselburg-Anholt in Westphalia – is the only record of this. The original was a donation document whereby Wezilo granted Saint Christopher's Church at Ravengiersburg an estate in the village of Lindenschied and also three mansos in Runa und Crummenauwe in pago Nachgowe (“oxgangs in Rhaunen and Krummenau in the County of the Nahegau”). Such pious gestures to the church were not unusual in mediaeval Germany, but they did come with conditions. This particular donation, for instance, required the recipient to say a Mass each Friday for the donor's salvation and also to sing a Requiem for him when he died. There is some question as to whether the manuscript writer, J. G. F. Schott, falsified the document just so that he could earn money by selling it, but whatever happened in the 18th century, it is highly likely that Krummenau is older than 900 years anyway.

=== Roman times to the Middle Ages ===
The Romans could never feel altogether safe in the Hunsrück in what they called Germania Superior. Beginning in the mid 4th century AD, Germanic peoples were thronging into the region. Before the Franks cut a swath of destruction along their path and took the land along the Moselle and on the Hunsrück into their ownership about 475, Roman colonist families left the area and withdrew along with Roman troops. Only the higher areas of the Hunsrück were left more or less untouched. A new settlement process began with farmsteads, clearings, village foundings and the division of the land into Gaue.

Throughout the Middle Ages, the old Roman road and a “grey cross” at the crossing of this road with the path from Krummenau to Hirschfeld formed important reckoning points for the borders of the sovereign area to which Krummenau belonged. “Aus dem kroen Kruytz in die Steynstraß immer dann die Steynstraß hin” reads one of many border descriptions from 1509 (“From the grey cross onto the Stone Road and then always down the Stone Road”). Furthermore, a 1508 Weistum likewise mentions the “grey cross” as part of a border description (a Weistum – cognate with English wisdom – was a legal pronouncement issued by men learned in law in the Middle Ages and early modern times). Even as late as 1711, a map marked a cross on the old Roman road at that spot, even though protocols from as early as 1461 had noted that it had long ceased to be there. There was, however, a “grey stone”.

Krummenau belonged to the High Court Region of Rhaunen, within which the Waldgraves of Schmidtburg, later those of Dhaun, sat as the lords of the high court, which as a high court had the power to hand down death sentences.

On 29 September 1399, Johann and Friedrich, Waldgraves at Dhaun, enfeoffed Count Palatine Ruprecht (who the very next year became Rupert, King of Germany) with the court and people at Krummenau, for which they received a charter of protection for this and other villages. In 1461 and 1469, the Waldgraves of Dhaun and Kyrburg were mentioned as lords of the high court. In 1493, 1508 and 1558 it was the Waldgraves of Dhaun. The court passed in 1633 to the Dhauns, who had now become the Rhinegraves of Dhaun. Beginning in 1789, sovereign rights passed to the Princes of Salm-Salm. In each case, the villagers were under serfdom.

=== French Revolutionary and Napoleonic times ===
Immediately affected by the French Revolutionary Wars in the late 18th century was the Hunsrück. Great havoc was wrought as French, Prussian and Austrian troops marched on through, taking their toll by demanding supplies and by encamping.

The winter of 1794–1795 must have been hard for the local people as well as for the French soldiers, many of whom were ill. The French did not stay long in any one place, not even in the winter, preferring to move elsewhere in search of supplies once they had depleted those nearby. The local schoolteacher in Krummenau, Korb, recorded plundering in the village by French soldiers.

The French swept the old feudal order away and the nobility was stripped of its powers and its holdings. Serfdom was abolished. A new administrative order was set up on the Rhine’s left bank after the French Revolutionary model. Krummenau now belonged to the Department of Sarre, the arrondissement of Birkenfeld, the canton of Rhaunen and the Mairie (“Mayoralty”) of Rhaunen. In 1801, with the Treaty of Lunéville, the Rhineland officially became French territory and all French laws came into force. The Code civil des Français was introduced in 1804.

=== Prussian times ===
French rule was brought to an end in 1814 with the victory over Napoleon. At the Congress of Vienna the following year, the Rhineland was awarded to Prussia. Krummenau found itself in the Bürgermeisterei (“Mayoralty”) of Rhaunen in the Bernkastel district, which in turn was in the Regierungsbezirk of Trier.

In Prussian times, the village's population began to swell, until it reached a point that was not sustainable. This forced some of the poorer people to take the risk of emigrating. From 1846 to 1851, nobody emigrated, at least not with official approval. Thereafter, however, history mentions 13 emigrants from that time.

=== Imperial Germany ===
In the last third of the 19th century, a few people from Krummenau moved to the industrial areas that had arisen by then, and the population began to shrink.

In this time, Krummenau was rather literally off the beaten track. No road led through the village. The Rhaunen-Weitersbach-Horbruch sealed road ran by the village through the “Crummer-Wald” (forest), not through the village. Nevertheless, the villagers were expected to pay for the upkeep of the stretch near the village. There were dirt paths leading to nearby villages such as Wahlenau, Niederweiler and Laufersweiler, but they were only passable by freight cart. There was also only one bridge across the Idarbach/Altbach in the village centre, built of stone and dating most likely from 1806. Another bridge was eventually built in 1912. The schoolhouse was dedicated in 1913.

The Bernkastel district was lucky enough to see work on its electrical supply begun at just the right time; it was far enough along before the outbreak of the First World War for there to be no need to suspend work. By 1915, it was working. The neighbouring Simmern district, on the other hand, saw all preparations for such a project stop for the duration.

The Mobilization Order on 1 August 1914 shook Krummenau badly, for nobody had seriously expected a war. The quiet village was thereafter affected more and more by the war. The problem of supplying food for the war effort had already been foreseen at the outbreak of the war, but it was not until 1915 that a system was introduced for this purpose. From one year to the next, Krummenau had to contribute ever greater amounts of grain and potatoes, as well as vegetables, straw, hay, oil-bearing crops, butter and eggs. It did not help matters that so many men were called into the forces to fight for the Kaiser; the bulk of the work thus fell to women, children and the elderly. Schools gave schoolchildren time off classes to help with the work (indeed, in 1915 school was out for 7½ months after the schoolteacher was conscripted). The workload was eased somewhat by help from Russian and later also French and British prisoners of war, who were housed at the old schoolhouse, and guarded by a man from Horbruch. One of the Russians escaped. There were 10 prisoners of war in Krummenau in 1918.

That same year, the Kaiser was overthrown, the monarchy was abolished and the Great War came to an end with Germany's defeat. Four times Krummenau had to put up with German soldiers lodging in the village on their way home from the front. The village was choked with people, horses and carriages. The soldiers made themselves at home anywhere: on farms, in barns, in stables, in meadows. Only the odd Frenchman and American showed up in the village looking for food.

Krummenau lost four men in the war; they were either killed or missing in action.

=== Weimar Germany ===
A new republican constitution brought Germany democracy, and the first election for the National Assembly on 19 January 1919 drew great interest in Krummenau. Sixty-nine votes were counted in the village: 44 for the Democrats, 11 for the Socialists and 14 for the Centrists.

The French occupied the Rhineland, and thereby the Hunsrück too, until 1930. They took a particularly heavy toll on the Hunsrück by felling an extraordinarily great number of trees. This was part of the war reparations imposed on Germany.

In 1932 and 1933, there was a great roadbuilding project in Krummenau together with water supply and sewerage projects. The district road was built through the village at last, changing the village centre forever. The old bakehouse had to be torn down to make way for the road.

By 1929, the political situation in Germany had become ominous. The National Socialists under their leader Adolf Hitler were gaining in popularity, and this would soon usher in a new era.

=== Nazi Germany ===
The National Socialist movement reached the Hunsrück rather later than it did other parts of Germany, namely about 1930. It appealed mainly to younger people. By 1932, a great deal of the Hunsrück's inhabitants had chosen the Nazis as their party. With Hitler's seizure of power in 1933, terror was legalized and racism became a political principle.

In Krummenau, unlike in many Hunsrück villages, the mayor, Adolf Zirfaß, was allowed to remain in office, while his peers elsewhere were removed by decree and replaced with mayors who were more receptive to the Nazis’ way of doing things. He held the office until 1945. The nearest Party Ortsgruppe, to which Krummenau belonged, was in Horbruch. There was no open opposition to the Nazi régime in Krummenau. A few villagers were brave enough to continue business with Jews, as they had always done, even after the Nazis forbade it.

It was also during the Third Reich – in 1935 – that Flurbereinigung was begun. This was, however, interrupted when the Second World War broke out.

Once again, prisoners of war were detailed to work in Krummenau. They were French, and were housed at the old rectory in Horbruch and were guarded by a man from that village. They were to be kept away from the locals, and were forbidden even to eat at the same table.

Shortly after war broke out, the schoolroom was seized by the military authorities. Schooling was for a while held at a private house. School had been reduced to three days each week by 1941 because the teacher had to fill in for another in Weitersbach. School was reduced even further once the teacher himself was called upon for military service. It was irregular until 1946; for a while, children attended school in Horbruch.

Beginning in 1944, the Hunsrück was subject to air raids. In March 1945, the Idar Forest was carpet-bombed by the Allies, with about 200 to 300 bombs falling within Krummenau's limits, mainly in the woods, damaging 10 to 12 hectares of forest. It is to this day a puzzle as to why this was done, for there were no military facilities in this part of the Idar Forest at this time. There may have been a link with the munitions offloading railway depot at Hochscheid, whose very existence may have led to the supposition that there was a munitions storage facility in the Idar Forest. There were five forestry workers in the danger zone at the time of the bombing, but nobody was wounded.

As Germany's looming defeat in the war became ever more obvious, enthusiasm for the Nazi régime sank ever deeper. The Volkssturm was organized in March 1945 as a last-ditch effort, and two tank traps were built in Krummenau, but on the night of 16 March, German troops retreated through the village on their way to Rhaunen and the river Nahe. Soon thereafter, on the morning of 17 March, the Americans marched in from Trarbach and Wahlenau, but did not stay, moving onwards. There was luckily no fighting in the village, as there was in Schlierschied. For Krummenau, the war was over. Six men from Krummenau had fallen or gone missing.

=== Allied occupation ===
Krummenau was occupied by United States forces. Adolf Zirfaß asked to be released from his mayoral duties in early April 1945, but was not replaced until August, when Otto Bonn was made commissary mayor. By this time, French forces had relieved the Americans of their occupational duties about a month earlier.

In 1946, Krummenau became part of the then newly founded state of Rhineland-Palatinate. It was grouped into the Amt of Rhaunen, the district of Bernkastel and the Regierungsbezirk of Trier. Democracy was reintroduced after 12 years of Nazi dictatorship, but participation at the first elections for the Bundestag was very low.

It took a long while before all the German prisoners of war came home. One local man, Heinrich Bartenbach, did not get home until October 1949.

Also arriving in Krummenau, as elsewhere in Germany, were refugees. The population had risen from 118 in 1948 to 129 in 1950. Town and city dwellers also came into the countryside seeking food.

=== Recent times ===
Beginning in the mid-1950s, the villagers’ economic situation improved generally, and the village's economic structure underwent a shift. Older buildings were modernized inside and out. Widespread rental accommodation leased by the Americans stationed here also brought such modern conveniences as sanitary facilities, electric cooking appliances and so forth. One loss for Krummenau was the old, stately Kroll house, a timber-frame house that had been the only one in the village with a mansard roof. It was torn down in 1977.

In 1958, there were 8 cars in Krummenau. Given the dearth of public transport in Krummenau, cars were viewed as a necessity, and through the years, their numbers rose. By 1984, there were 48. The rise in popularity of motoring spurred improvements to the local roads. Work on tarring roadways to neighbouring villages, however, was not finished until the late 1960s.

In the wake of the Second World War, the Allied occupiers established many military facilities in the Hunsrück, and Krummenau was affected by this process, too. The French built a munitions depot covering 127 ha of the Idar Forest, ten to twelve hectares of which lay within Krummenau's limits (the rest was in neighbouring Weitersbach). The depot was taken over in 1963/1964 by the Bundeswehr. The depot contributed to the local economy as an employer, and a few local civilians were employed there as watchmen. The depot has since been converted into a storage facility for military replacement parts.

Military manoeuvres, which were common throughout rural areas in the Bonn Republic, were also undertaken in the woods near Krummenau, and in 1963, there was a nasty accident. Some children from Krummenau who were playing in the woods found some ordnance in the forest that had been left behind by soldiers and lit some of the powder that they had gathered together from it. Nine-year-old Berthold Weiskopf sustained burns to both his hands and his face.

The valley road to Bernkastel was finally opened in 1972, after first being proposed in 1920. Its construction required some realignment of roadways through Krummenau. One stretch of road was straightened so that it no longer had two right angles in it, right near each other, and another stretch now goes through an underpass right in the village. The river also had to be channelled through a steel pipe (owing to a contingency that the planners had failed to foresee), and the old Bauernmühle (“Farmer’s Mill”) downstream from Krummenau had to be torn down to make way for the new road. The road's construction also involved blasting in several places. The road has been a double-edged sword for Krummenau. On the one hand, traffic through the village has increased, but on the other hand, it has also increased tourism, for the road is quite scenic and affords good views of the valley.

Despite opposition expressed at a citizens’ meeting in 1968 to having Krummenau transferred from the Bernkastel district to the Birkenfeld district, the state administrative reformers got their way and the whole Amt but for Lindenschied and Woppenroth was transferred to the Birkenfeld district in the Regierungsbezirk of Koblenz in 1970. The Amt administration in Rhaunen became a Verbandsgemeinde administration.

A new building development was opened in Krummenau in 1983 called “In der Spießwiese”.

=== Monastery ===
It is far from certain whether there was ever a monastery at Krummenau, but according to oral tradition, there was one called Saint Lawrence’s here once, which stood until the Reformation was introduced in 1555. It is furthermore said that it was a popular pilgrimage site. The people of Laufersweiler, according to this oral tradition, have now stolen this monastery and it is now in Laufersweiler. The village church, built in 1747, supposedly stands across the street from where the monastery once was. The mighty oaken beams of the church’s galleries, it is said, as well as the beams from the old Kroll house, torn down in 1977, were taken from the old monastery.

=== Population development ===
The following table shows Krummenau’s population figures for selected dates since 1515:

Year	Population
1515	35
1556	50
about 1599	32
1606	51
1620	30
1641	45
1733	12 subjects
1815/1823	110
1835/1846	136
1871	140
1895	107
1910	115
1939	124
1948	118
1950	129
1961	124
1970	126
1980	112
1986	121

== Politics ==
=== Municipal council ===
The council is made up of 6 council members, who were elected by majority vote at the municipal election held on 7 June 2009, and the honorary mayor as chairman.

=== Mayor ===
Krummenau's mayor is Gerd Böhnke.

=== Coat of arms ===
The German blazon reads: Schild durch einen blauen Balken geteilt, oben in Gold ein rotes Fabeltier mit einem Wolfskopf und weit geöffneten Schwingen belegt mit einem Wolfshaken. Unten in Silber ein schwarzer Rost.

The municipality's arms might in English heraldic language be described thus: A fess azure between Or a monster with a wolf's head and eagle's body sans legs displayed gules, its breast charged with a cramp palewise sable, and argent a gridiron palewise of the fourth.

The monstrous charge above the line of partition – also found in the Verbandsgemeinde arms – is a reference to the village's former allegiance to the Waldgraves and Rhinegraves and to its former inclusion in that noble house's high court region, for it is the charge that appeared in the court seal. The charge below the line of partition, the gridiron, is Saint Lawrence’s attribute, thus representing the church’s patron saint. The church was originally consecrated to him in 1086, although the current church is from 1747. The fess stands for the brook that flows through the village.

== Culture and sightseeing ==
=== Buildings ===
The following are listed buildings or sites in Rhineland-Palatinate’s Directory of Cultural Monuments:

- Evangelical church, Kirchstraße – small aisleless church with ridge turret, marked 1747; décor; in the graveyard two tombs from the late 19th century
- Hauptstraße – three one-arch bridges over the Altbach, 1806 and 1838/1839
- Hauptstraße 7 – three-naved, cross-vaulted stable, about 1850/1860

Spanning the Idarbach is a slate arch bridge onto one of whose spandrels the old churchtower clock, with its figures in gold leaf, has been mounted.

=== Natural monuments ===
The roughly 400-year-old Kaisereiche (“Emperor’s Oak”) is protected as a natural monument. It stands some 500 m southeast of the village.

== Economy and infrastructure ==
Krummenau has a village community centre. Serving nearby Idar-Oberstein is a railway station on the Nahe Valley Railway (Bingen–Saarbrücken).
