= USS Sirona =

Cargo ship of the United States Navy

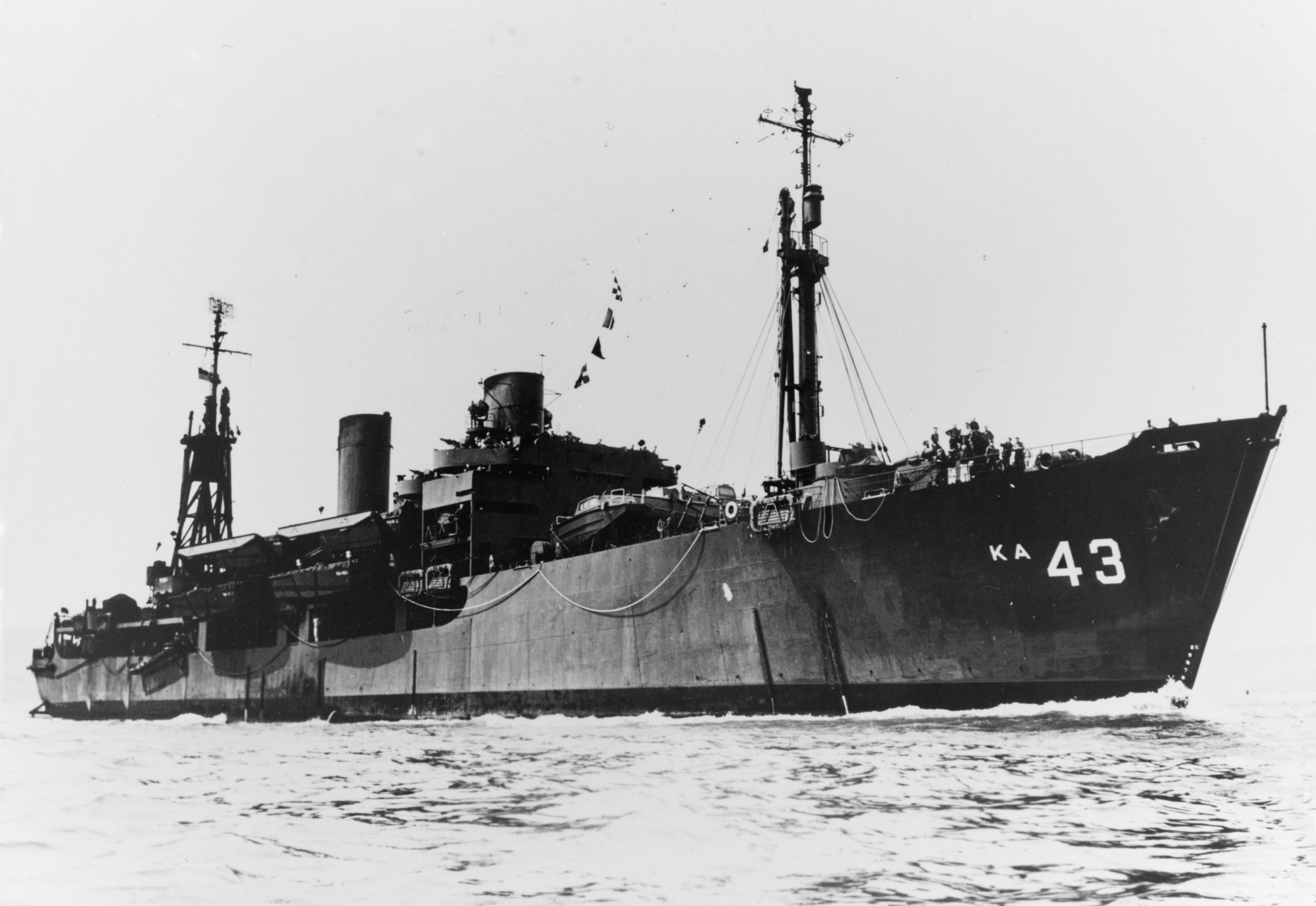

History

United States
- Name: USS Sirona
- Namesake: The asteroid Sirona
- Builder: Walsh-Kaiser Company, Providence, Rhode Island
- Laid down: 15 February 1945
- Launched: 17 April 1945
- Commissioned: 10 May 1945
- Decommissioned: 12 June 1946
- Stricken: 3 July 1946
- Fate: Sold for scrapping, 17 May 1966

General characteristics
- Class & type: Artemis-class attack cargo ship
- Type: S4–SE2–BE1
- Displacement: 4,087 long tons (4,153 t) light; 7,080 long tons (7,194 t) full
- Length: 426 ft (130 m)
- Beam: 58 ft (18 m)
- Draft: 16 ft (4.9 m)
- Speed: 16.9 knots (31.3 km/h; 19.4 mph)
- Complement: 303 officers and enlisted
- Armament: 1 × 5"/38 caliber gun mount; 4 × twin 40 mm gun mounts; 10 × 20 mm gun mounts

USS Sirona (AKA-43) was an Artemis-class attack cargo ship in service with the United States Navy from 1945 to 1946. She was scrapped in 1966.

== History ==
Sirona (AKA-43) was named after the asteroid 116 Sirona, which in turn is named after the Celtic goddess Sirona. The ship was laid down on 15 February 1945 under United States Maritime Commission contract (MC hull 1904) by the Walsh-Kaiser Co., Inc., Providence, R.I.; launched on 17 April 1945; sponsored by Mrs. Lawrence B. Harris; and commissioned on 10 May 1945.

Sirona arrived at Hampton Roads on 24 May 1945 and underwent abbreviated shakedown training there from 28 May to 1 June. After a brief repair period, she departed Norfolk on 7 June for France, arriving at Marseille on the 21st. There she loaded troops and supplies and sailed for the Pacific, transiting the Panama Canal on 11 July. On the 28th, she rendered medical assistance to the crew of tanker Esso Rochester; and, after calls at Eniwetok and Ulithi, she arrived at Manila on 13 August.

On 25 August, Sirona left Manila as part of a large transport force bound for Tokyo, Japan. She remained in Tokyo Bay from 2–5 September and arrived at Okinawa on the 7th. Upkeep there was interrupted when she got underway to avoid a typhoon between the 16th and 18th. On the 19th, the ship embarked 200 Marines and 514 tons of cargo; and, on the 27th, she sailed with a large transport group, which arrived at Taku, China, on 30 September. She offloaded her troops and cargo there on 4 and 5 October and then sailed for Manila on the 6th.

Upon arrival at Manila, Sirona's crew built temporary troop berthing facilities in her cargo holds, adding 295 berths to the 264 in her normal troop quarters. The ship departed Manila on 22 October; and, upon arrival at Kowloon on the 24th, she embarked 1,035 troops of the 13th Chinese Army, with 34 tons of rice, small-arms ammunition, and light equipment. She sailed with six other transports on the 25th for Dalian, Manchuria; but, on the 28th, was diverted to Qinhuangdao where she disembarked her troops and cargo on 30 and 31 October. Returning to Kowloon on 7 November, she embarked about 800 men of the Chinese Honorable 1st Division, which she delivered at Qingdao on the 14th.

The ship remained there until being assigned on the 26th to return servicemen to the United States under operation "Magic Carpet". Between 29 November and 1 December, she embarked 504 troops at Shanghai and disembarked them at Seattle on 16 December. Sirona was detached from the "Magic Carpet" force on 30 December, and remained in Seattle pending a decision on her postwar employment.

On 9 April 1946, she sailed from Seattle and arrived at Boston, Massachusetts, on 17 May. There, she was decommissioned on 12 June and transferred the same day to the Maritime Commission for service as the training ship Yankee States at the Massachusetts Maritime Academy. Struck from the Navy list on 3 July 1946, the ship was laid up in the Maritime Commission Reserve Fleet in the James River on 29 July 1947; and was sold to the Boston Metals Corp., Baltimore, Maryland., on 17 May 1966 for scrapping.
