= 116 Sirona =

Main-belt asteroid

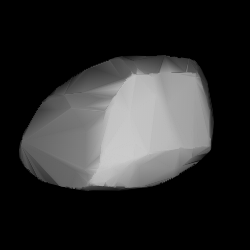
- 3D convex shape model of 116 Sirona

Discovery
- Discovered by: Christian Heinrich Friedrich Peters
- Discovery date: 8 September 1871

Designations
- Pronunciation: /ˈsɪroʊnə/
- Named after: Đīrona
- Alternative designations: A871 RA; 1954 UC_{3}; 1998 EK_{13}; 1998 ES_{21}
- Minor planet category: Main belt

Orbital characteristics
- Epoch 31 July 2016 (JD 2457600.5)
- Uncertainty parameter 0
- Observation arc: 143.31 yr (52345 d)
- Aphelion: 3.1616 AU (472.97 Gm)
- Perihelion: 2.37322 AU (355.029 Gm)
- Semi-major axis: 2.76741 AU (413.999 Gm)
- Eccentricity: 0.14244
- Orbital period (sidereal): 4.60 yr (1681.5 d)
- Average orbital speed: 17.81 km/s
- Mean anomaly: 7.59231°
- Mean motion: 0° 12^{m} 50.724^{s} / day
- Inclination: 3.5635°
- Longitude of ascending node: 63.724°
- Argument of perihelion: 94.932°
- Earth MOID: 1.38451 AU (207.120 Gm)
- Jupiter MOID: 1.83156 AU (273.997 Gm)
- T_{Jupiter}: 3.321

Physical characteristics
- Dimensions: 71.70±5.8 km
- Mass: (5.4±1.6)×10^{17} kg (Note: Calculated from its standard gravitational parameter GM = 0.036±0.011 km^{3}/s^{2}.)
- Mean density: 2.78 g/cm^{3}
- Equatorial surface gravity: 0.0200 m/s^{2}
- Equatorial escape velocity: 0.0379 km/s
- Synodic rotation period: 12.028 h (0.5012 d)
- Geometric albedo: 0.2560±0.047
- Temperature: ~167 K
- Spectral type: S
- Absolute magnitude (H): 7.82

116 Sirona is a somewhat large and bright-colored main-belt asteroid that was discovered by the German-American astronomer C. H. F. Peters on September 8, 1871, and named after Sirona, the Celtic goddess of healing.

This body is orbiting the Sun with a period of 4.60 years and an eccentricity (ovalness) of 0.14. The orbital plane is inclined by 3.56° to the plane of the ecliptic. The cross-section diameter of this object is ~72 km. Photometric observations of this asteroid gave a light curve with a period of 12.028 hours and a brightness variation of 0.42 in magnitude. It has the spectrum of an S-type asteroid, suggesting a siliceous composition.
