= Walschbronn =

- Commune
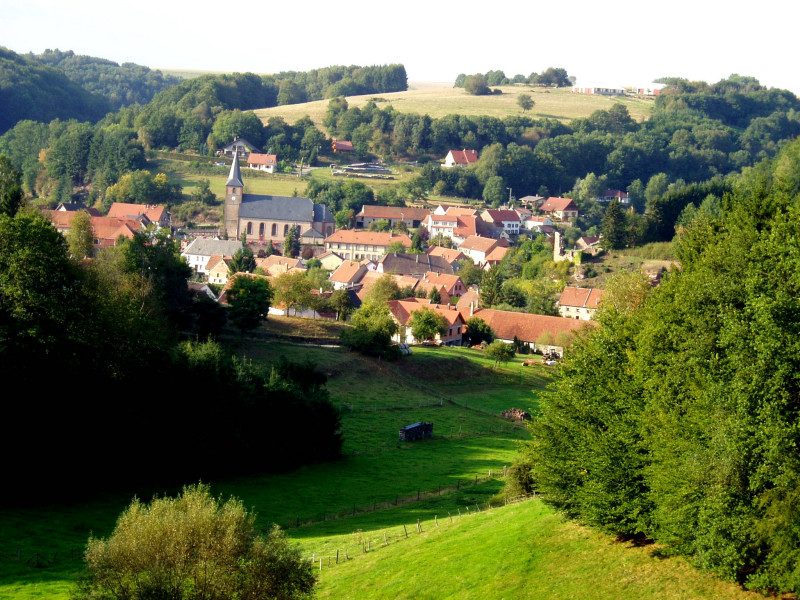
- A general view of Walschbronn

- Coat of arms
- Location of Walschbronn
- Location within France Location within Grand Est
- Coordinates: 49°08′57″N 7°28′55″E
- Country: France
- Region: Grand Est
- Department: Moselle
- Arrondissement: Sarreguemines
- Canton: Bitche
- Intercommunality: Pays de Bitche

Government
  - Mayor (2020–2026): Christian Schwalbach
- Area^{1}: 10.11 km^{2} (3.90 sq mi)
- Elevation: 320 m (1,050 ft)
- Highest elevation: 387 m (1,270 ft)
- Lowest elevation: 247 m (810 ft)
- Population (2023): 384
  - Density: 38.0/km^{2} (98.4/sq mi)
- Time zone: UTC+01:00 (CET)
  - Summer (DST): UTC+02:00 (CEST)
- INSEE/Postal code: 57741 /57720
- Website: www.walschbronn.fr
- ^{1} French Land Register data, which excludes lakes, ponds, glaciers > 1 km^{2} (0.386 sq mi or 247 acres) and river estuaries.

Walschbronn (German pronunciation: [valʃbʁɔn]) is a commune in the Moselle department of the Grand Est administrative region in north-eastern France.

The village belongs to the Pays de Bitche and to the Northern Vosges Regional Nature Park.

== Population ==
Historical population
Year	Pop.	±% p.a.
1968	552	—
1975	539	−0.34%
1982	532	−0.19%
1990	478	−1.33%
1999	525	+1.05%
2007	548	+0.54%
2012	495	−2.01%
2017	497	+0.08%
2023	384	−4.21%
Source: INSEE

== See also ==
- Communes of the Moselle department
