= Grannus =

Gaulish god of healing and springs

Grannus (also Grannos) was an ancient Celtic healing god associated with springs and curative waters. He was worshipped in Gaul, the two Germanies, Raetia and the Danube provinces, with scattered dedications from Britain, Hispania, Rome and beyond the Rhine frontier. In the Roman period he was most often identified with Apollo through the interpretatio romana and appears in inscriptions as Apollo Grannus. His usual companion was the goddess Sirona. He is named in about thirty Latin dedications, in a Greek honorific inscription from Ephesus, and by the historian Cassius Dio, who records that the emperor Caracalla sought his aid.

== Name ==
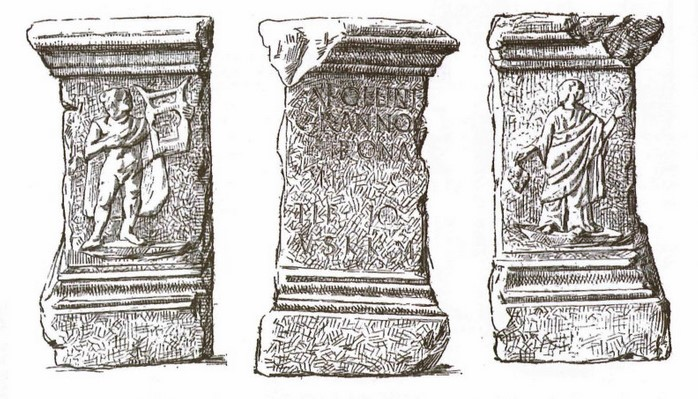
Altar to Apollon Grannus and Sirona, Baumburg (Germany)

The theonym is recorded in about thirty Latin dedicatory inscriptions, in a Greek honorific text from Ephesus, and once in classical literature, by Cassius Dio. At a few sites a further local byname is attached to him: Amarcolitanus ('far-seeing') at Branges, Mogounus ('the mighty one') at Horbourg-Wihr and Phoebus at Trier.

The theonym Grannus is a latinised form of Gaulish Grannos. Its etymology remains debated.

One line of interpretation connects the name with Proto-Celtic *grand- (or *grend-), meaning 'beard'. (Note: cf. Middle Irish grend, Middle Welsh grann ('chin, beard, cheek'), Middle Breton grann ('eyebrow'). Old French grenon ('small beard'), Old Spanish greñon ('beard') and Occitan gren ('moustache') are derived from an earlier *grennos, which is supposed to be Gaulish, but the vocalism is difficult to reconcile with the theonym.) On this reading Grannus would mean roughly 'the bearded one'. Xavier Delamarre treats this as the best-supported explanation, although Jürgen Zeidler points out that the god is never actually portrayed with a beard in Gallo-Roman art.

Another proposition connects the name to a reconstructed form *gra-snó- (< *gwhr-snó-), which could be related to Proto-Celtic *gwrīns- (or *gwrens-), meaning 'heat'. (Note: cf. Middle Irish grīs ('heat, glow, embers'), Middle Welsh gwres ('heat [of the sun, fire], passion, lust').) Zeidler contends that this would make the name a probable reference to the sun's heat and healing properties, and would be supported with the byname Phoebus attached to Apollo Grannus, and the place name Phoebiana, the site of one of the sanctuaries. Jan de Vries preferred this reading, relating Grannus to warm springs and rejecting the 'beard' etymology on the ground that beardedness was not distinctive of Celtic gods. (Note: A further derivation, from *ǵher- ('shine, gleam'), proposed by Garrett Olmsted, has found little support.) The theonym has been compared with the Old Irish grían ('sun'), possibly from Proto-Celtic *g^{w}rensnā, although this has also been criticised.

Personal names of the same stem (Grania, Grannius, Grannicus) are recorded across the western provinces. Place-names include Aquae Granni ('the waters of Grannus'), which lies behind the modern name of Aachen, and *Granno-ialon ('clearing of Grannus'), the origin of Grignols in modern Dordogne.

== Cult ==
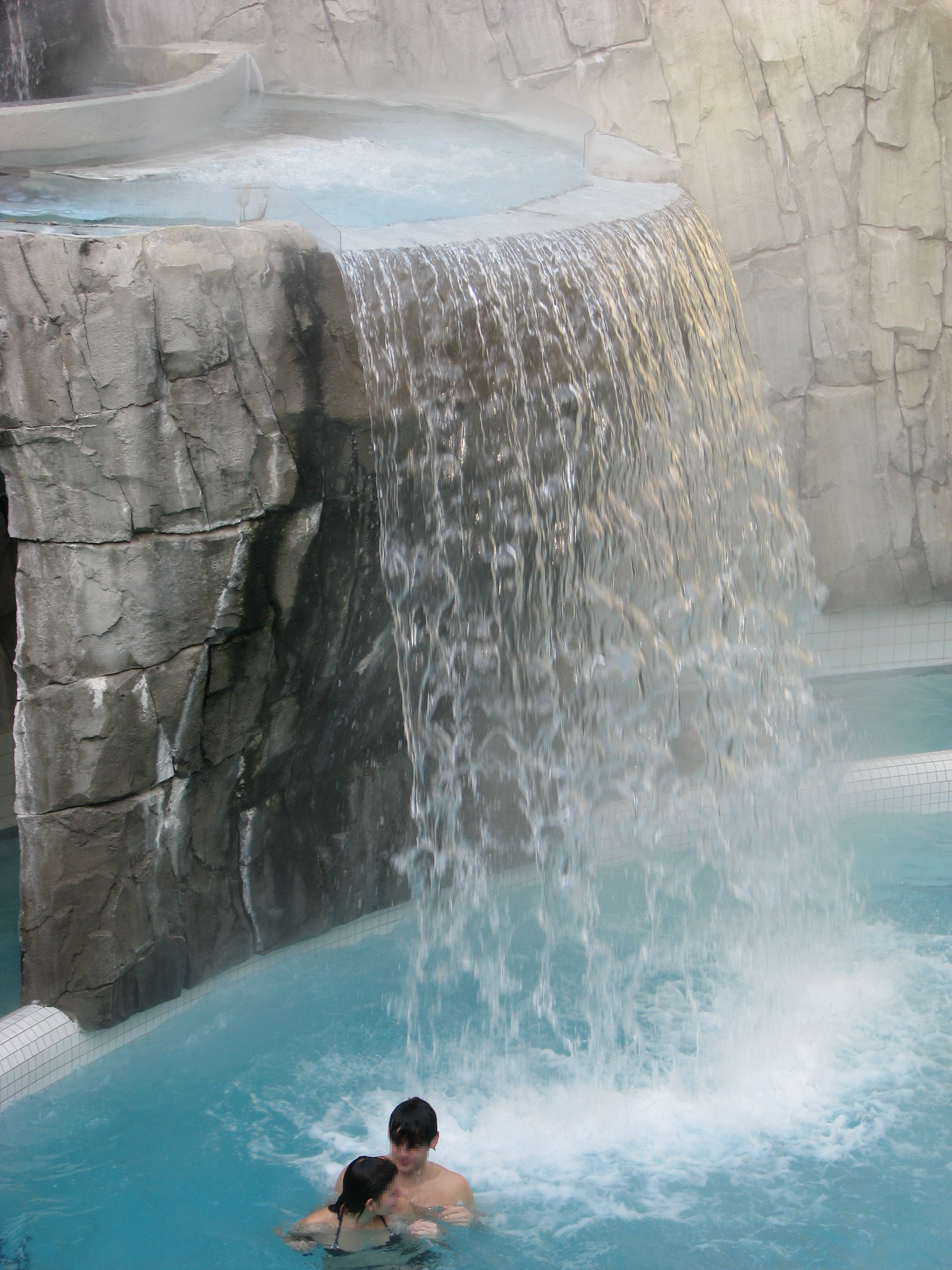
Hot springs such as those at Aquae Granni (today's Aachen) are thought to have been dedicated to Grannus.

The clearest statement of Grannus's character comes from Cassius Dio, who lists Apollo Grannus with Asclepius and Serapis among the healing gods to whom Caracalla appealed, without relief, during his illness. The notice shows that by the early 3rd century Grannus was known across much of the empire as a healing god equated with Apollo, and that sanctuaries were dedicated to him. His wide reputation at that time is confirmed by a Greek honorific inscription from Ephesus, datable to 217 or 218 AD, which records that a leading citizen travelled to Apollo Grannus in the course of an official embassy in Caracalla's entourage. Which sanctuary the emperor and the envoy sought is disputed. An older identification with Aquae (Baden-Baden), renamed by Caracalla and known for its thermal springs, has been abandoned, since nothing there points to a cult of Grannus. Recent scholarship divides between Grand and Faimingen. Andreas Hofeneder argues for Faimingen: the envoy's itinerary places the sanctuary between Upper Germany and Sirmium, in Raetia rather than at Grand further west, the emperor's illness falls during his Alamannic campaign on the Raetian frontier, and three milestones naming Phoebiana as the road-head, dated to 212, record road-building at Faimingen under Caracalla. Certainty, he allows, is not attainable.

He [Caracalla] received no help from Apollo Grannus, nor yet from Aesculapius or Serapis, in spite of his many supplications and his unwearying persistence. For even while abroad he sent to them prayers, sacrifices and votive offerings, and many couriers ran hither and thither every day carrying something of this kind; and he also went to them himself, hoping to prevail by appearing in person, and did all that devotees are wont to do; but he obtained nothing that contributed to health.

— Cassius Dio, Roman History, 77:15:5–6, translated by Earnest Cary

Grannus was worshipped chiefly at springs and wells. His two best-attested cult centres are Grand in the Vosges and Faimingen (ancient Phoebiana) in Raetia, both large sanctuaries known from excavation as well as from inscriptions. At Grand the Roman-period theonym is not directly attested. The local name later spelt Grand goes back to Gran, and the form Grannum is known only from a Merovingian coin, so the equation with Grannus, though likely, rests on the medieval evidence. The same caution applies to Aachen, whose medieval name Aquae Granni implies a sanctuary of the god but is first recorded only in the 8th century.

Elsewhere Grannus is joined with the Nymphs at Ennetach, with Hygia at Faimingen, and, at Astorga in Spain, with a group of eastern deities including Serapis and Isis. Many of the dedicants were officials and soldiers. Imperial procurators set up altars at Inveresk in Britain, at Sarmizegetusa in Dacia and at Astorga, imperial legates at Bonn and Lauingen, and legionary officers at Lauingen. The wide and scattered distribution of the cult reflects the god's popularity in the imperial period, promoted by Caracalla's devotion and carried by the mobility of officials and troops, and should not be projected back into pre-Roman times.

Two inscriptions attach Grannus to the public life of the Lemovices. At Limoges the vergobret Postumus, the chief magistrate of the community, provided at his own expense the aqua Martia for the decamnoctiacis Granni, the 'Ten Nights of Grannus', a festival that implies a cult requiring running water over ten days and nights. The text, in a Gaulish-Latin formula of the Julio-Claudian period, shows Grannus as a major deity of the community. At nearby Chassenon (Cassinomagus), in a dedication of the 2nd century AD, the god appears as Mars Grannus Victor, paired with the otherwise unknown local goddess Cobrandia. This is the only text in which Grannus is linked with Mars.

== Interpretation ==
What kind of god Grannus was is read in two ways. Jan de Vries grouped him with the healing gods of springs, such as Borvo, and understood the cult as centred on curative and thermal waters. Jürgen Zeidler argued instead for a solar deity. He observed that most of the sanctuaries, Grand, Faimingen and Hochscheid among them, stand at ordinary wells or watercourses, not at thermal springs. A god defined by hot water would not fit such sites, so Zeidler located the healing power in light and heat rather than in the waters themselves. On this view Grannus belongs with a group of Celtic healing deities whose names denote brightness, among them his consort Sirona ('star'), Sulis ('sun') at Bath, and Luxovius at Luxeuil, in a pattern that links light with curative power. John T. Koch notes that a derivation of the name from Irish grian ('sun') would account both for the equation with Apollo and for the pairing with Sirona. Hofeneder is more cautious. He notes that the byname Phoebus is attested for the god only once, that the place-name Phoebiana may derive from a personal name rather than from the deity, and that the etymologies of Sirona and Sulis on which the argument leans are themselves disputed, so that the evidence is too ambiguous to establish a solar character.

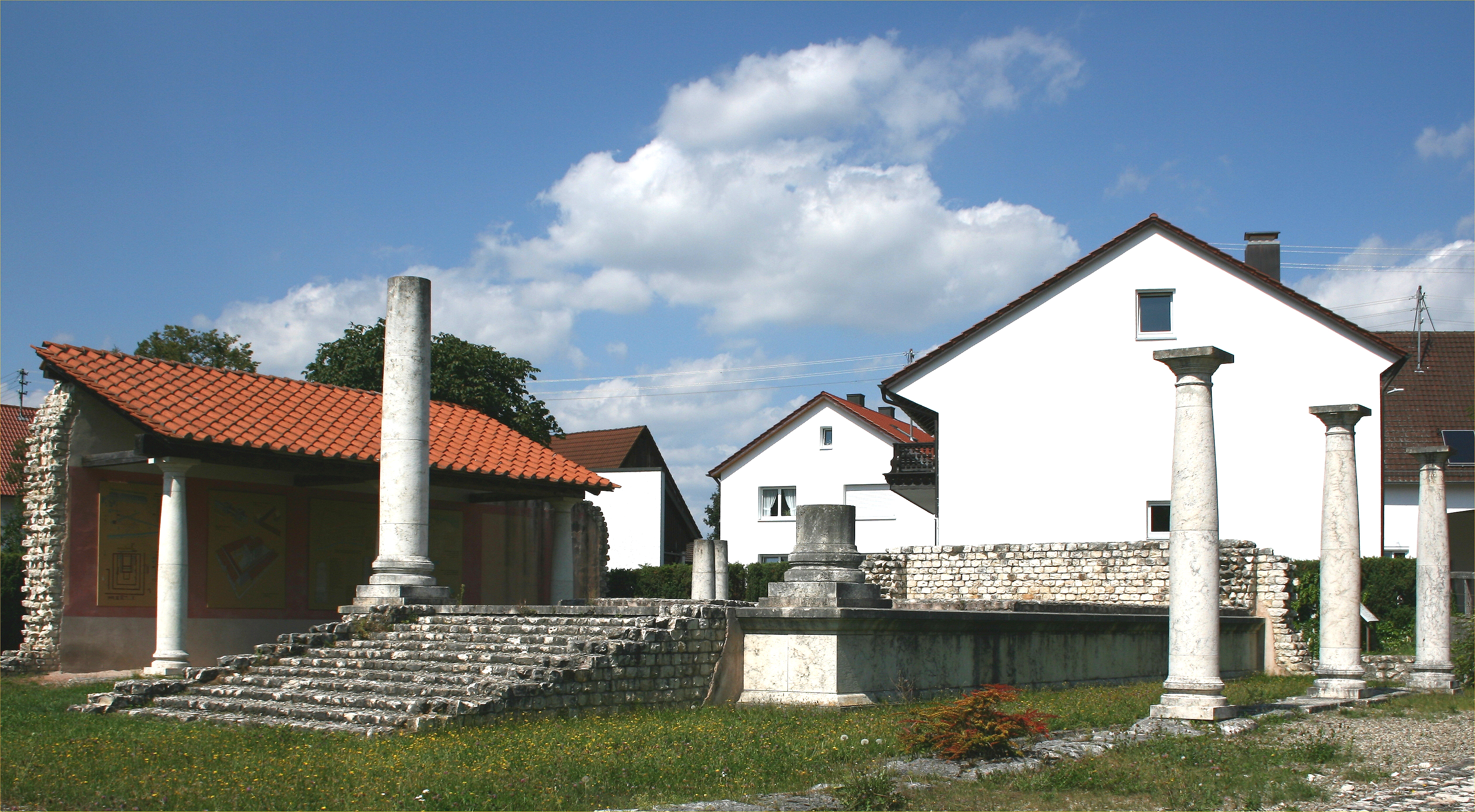
Partially reconstructed temple of Apollo Grannus at Faimingen (Phoebiana) near Lauingen

Grannus is one of a set of native names, with Belenus and Borvo, brought under Apollo in Gaul by the interpretatio romana. Caesar describes the Gauls' Apollo as a god who drives away diseases, and it is this healing Apollo with which Grannus was most often identified. Whether such names were originally independent Gaulish gods later identified with Apollo, or native epithets of a single Apollo, is disputed. De Vries thought that independent native deities probably lay behind them. The identification was not fixed in any case. Koch observes that one Celtic god could take several Roman identities, and although Grannus is almost always Apollo, he is joined to Jupiter at Aquincum and to Mars at Chassenon.

The dedication from Chassenon has been read as evidence that Grannus had a protective as well as a healing side. Restoring the epithet as Victor, David Hourcade and Louis Maurin link the identification with Mars to the tutelary role of the Gaulish Mars, a protector of the community by force of arms more than a war-god in the narrow sense. On their reading Grannus was invoked at Chassenon as a guardian of the Lemovices, while elsewhere his curative side drew the identification with Apollo. On their account the double name Mars Grannus, like Apollo Grannus, denotes a composite Gallo-Roman figure and not a simple fusion of two gods.

How far the cult was ancient is uncertain. Bernhard Maier cautions that the god's wide but scattered distribution belongs to the imperial period and does not warrant reconstructing a pre-Roman cult of comparable reach. The native festival of the 'Ten Nights of Grannus' at Limoges, and the god's standing among the chief public deities of the Lemovices, nevertheless show that a genuinely Gaulish cult existed at least locally before Grannus gained wider currency as Apollo Grannus.

== Epigraphy ==
Grannus is named in about thirty Latin dedications of the Roman period, concentrated in eastern Gaul, the two Germanies and Raetia, with outliers in Noricum, Pannonia, Dacia, Britain, Hispania, Rome and, beyond the empire, as far as Sweden.

In the great majority of the inscriptions the god carries the interpretatio romana as Apollo Grannus. He is named without Apollo in the verse inscription from Bonn and, in a Gaulish formula, at Limoges. He is joined to Mars at Chassenon and to Jupiter, with Apollo, at Aquincum.

In roughly a fifth of them, he is paired with the goddess Sirona. Several further inscriptions naming Apollo with Sirona, but without the byname Grannus, are generally referred to the same god.

Text	Find-spot	Divine name(s)	Translation	Reference	Comments
Postumus Du[m]norigis f(ilius) verg(obretus) aquam Martiam decamnoctiacis Granni d(e) s(ua) p(ecunia) d(edit)	Limoges (Haute-Vienne)	Grannus	Postumus, son of Dumnorix, vergobret, gave the aqua Martia for the Ten Nights of Grannus at his own expense.	AE 1989, 521	Grannus without Apollo, in a Gaulish-Latin formula. Set up by the vergobret, the chief magistrate of the Lemovices. decamnoctiacis Granni is read as 'the Ten Nights (festival) of Grannus'. Julio-Claudian.
[Numinib(us) Augusto]r(um) Marti Granno Vi[ctori et dea]e Cobrandiae [...]rinus Scauri filius [...] et D]ubnodaga fili [...] de sua pecun(ia) ded(erunt)	Chassenon (Charente)	Mars Grannus (Victor), Cobrandia	To the divine powers of the Augusti, to Mars Grannus Victor and to the goddess Cobrandia, [...]rinus son of Scaurus and Dubnodaga, his sons, gave (this) at their own expense.	AE 2013, 1058	The only text linking Grannus with Mars. The epithet Victor and much of the text are restored. Paired with the otherwise unknown local goddess Cobrandia ('she of the border'). 2nd century AD.
Deo Apollini Granno Amarcolitan(o) Veranus Verci fil(ius) Tilander v(otum) s(olvit) l(ibens) m(erito)	Branges (Saône-et-Loire) (Note: CIL/EDCS give Branges (Haedui, Lugdunensis). Hofeneder 2013, n. 69 argues the true find-spot is nearby Monthelon.)	Apollo Grannus Amarcolitanus	To the god Apollo Grannus Amarcolitanus, Veranus, son of Vercus, Tilander, fulfilled his vow willingly and deservedly.	CIL XIII, 2600	With the Gaulish byname Amarcolitanus ('far-seeing'). In the territory of the Aedui.
In h(onorem) d(omus) d(ivinae) [d]eo Apollini G]ra[nn]o Phoeb(o) L(ucius) I[n]genuvius Primanu[s] ex voto p(osuit)	Trier (Augusta Treverorum)	Apollo Grannus Phoebus	In honour of the divine house, to the god Apollo Grannus Phoebus, Lucius Ingenuvius Primanus set (this) up in fulfilment of a vow.	CIL XIII, 3635	With the byname Phoebus.
In h(onorem) d(omus) d(ivinae) Apollin[i Granno] et Siro[nae]	Bitburg (Belgica)	Apollo Grannus, Sirona	In honour of the divine house, to Apollo Grannus and Sirona.	CIL XIII, 4129	
Apollin(i) Granno Mogouno aram Q(uintus) Licini(us) Trio d(e) s(uo) d(edit)	Horbourg-Wihr (Haut-Rhin)	Apollo Grannus Mogounus	To Apollo Grannus Mogounus, Quintus Licinius Trio gave this altar at his own expense.	CIL XIII, 5315	With the byname Mogounus.
In h(onorem) d(omus) d(ivinae) Apollini Granno L(ucius) Iul(ius) Victorinus dec(urio) c(ivitatis) A() G() pater pro filio L(ucio) Iul(io) Lepido v(otum) s(olvit) l(ibens) l(aetus) m(erito)	Gochsen (Germania Superior)	Apollo Grannus	In honour of the divine house, to Apollo Grannus, Lucius Iulius Victorinus, decurion of the civitas, the father, fulfilled his vow willingly, gladly and deservedly on behalf of his son Lucius Iulius Lepidus.	CIL XIII, 6462	
In h(onorem) d(omus) [d(ivinae)] Apollini Grann[o] [...] Attius	Erp (Germania Inferior)	Apollo Grannus	In honour of the divine house, to Apollo Grannus, [...] Attius.	CIL XIII, 7975	
[...] [S]ospiti Concordiae [G]ranno Camenis Martis et Pacis Lari quin[e]t deorum stirpe genito Caesari C(aius) Fulvius Maximus leg(atus) Aug(usti) pr(o) pr(aetore)	Bonn (Bonna)	Grannus (among others)	To Sospes, Concordia, Grannus, the Camenae, the Lar of Mars and Peace, and to the Caesar sprung from the stock of the gods, Gaius Fulvius Maximus, imperial propraetorian legate, (dedicated this).	CIL XIII, 8007	A verse dedication by the legate Gaius Fulvius Maximus. Grannus is named without Apollo, among several other deities.
Apollini Grann(o) Cl(audia) Paterna ex imperio	Nijmegen (Noviomagus Batavorum)	Apollo Grannus	To Apollo Grannus, Claudia Paterna, by his command.	CIL XIII, 8712	
Apollini Grann[o] Aulius Florius Gr[a]tus(?) c(ivis) Trever v(ovit) l(ibens) [m(erito)]	Speyer (Noviomagus Nemetum)	Apollo Grannus	To Apollo Grannus, Aulius Florius Gratus(?), a Treveran citizen, vowed (this) willingly and deservedly.	AE 1936, 76	Dedicated by a Treveran.
Apollini Granno Martius Senopatius Novellus dedicavit XV K(alendas) Sep(tembres) Pisone et Iuliano co(n)s(ulibus)	Alzey (Germania Superior)	Apollo Grannus	To Apollo Grannus, Martius Senopatius Novellus dedicated (this) on the fifteenth day before the Kalends of September, in the consulship of Piso and Iulianus.	AE 1933, 138	Dated to 18 August 175.
Serapidi Sancto Isidi Myrionym(a)e Cor(a)e Invictae Apollini Granno Marti Sagato Iul(ius) Melanio proc(urator) Augg(ustorum) v(otum) s(olvit)	Astorga (Asturica Augusta)	Serapis, Isis, Kore, Apollo Grannus, Mars Sagatus	To Serapis Sanctus, Isis of the myriad names, Kore Invicta, Apollo Grannus, Mars Sagatus, Iulius Melanio, procurator of the two Augusti, fulfilled his vow.	AE 1968, 230	Set up by an imperial procurator. Grannus is named among a group of oriental deities.
[Deo Apollini Gr]anno Consi[n]ius [...tri]bunus [...] somno iussus	Grand (Vosges)	Apollo Grannus	To the god Apollo Grannus, Consinius [...], tribune [...], commanded in a dream (set this up).	AE 1937, 55	somno iussus, 'commanded in a dream', pointing to incubation. From the sanctuary at Grand.
Apollini Granno Sironae [...] v(otum) s(olverunt) l(ibentes) l(aeti) m(erito)	Baumburg (Bedaium, Noricum)	Apollo Grannus, Sirona	To Apollo Grannus and Sirona, [...] fulfilled their vow willingly, gladly and deservedly.	CIL III, 5588	
[Nav]alem [Gra]no Apollini Lol(lius) Trophi[m]us et Loll[ia Pro]b[at]a ex voto f[ecer]unt	Teurnia (Sankt Peter im Holz, Noricum)	Granus Apollo	Lollius Trophimus and Lollia Probata made a navale ('ship-shed') for Granus Apollo in fulfilment of a vow.	AE 1978, 595	A building inscription for the construction of a navale ('ship-shed'). The name stands in the reversed order Granus Apollo. Inscribed on two faces. 2nd century.
Apollini Granno et Nymphis C(aius) Vidius Iulius pro se et suis v(otum) s(olvit) l(ibens) l(aetus) m(erito)	Ennetach (Raetia)	Apollo Grannus, Nymphs	To Apollo Grannus and the Nymphs, Gaius Vidius Iulius, for himself and his household, fulfilled his vow willingly, gladly and deservedly.	CIL III, 5861	With the Nymphs.
In h(onorem) d(omus) d(ivinae) Apolli(ni) Granno Baienius Victor et Baienius Victor et Baienius Victorinus fili(i) eius ex vis{s}u signum cum base	Faimingen (Phoebiana, Raetia)	Apollo Grannus	In honour of the divine house, to Apollo Grannus, Baienius Victor and Baienius Victor and Baienius Victorinus, his sons, (set up) a statue with its base in accordance with a vision.	CIL III, 5870	From the sanctuary at Faimingen.
Apollini Granno signum cum base	Faimingen (Phoebiana, Raetia)	Apollo Grannus	To Apollo Grannus, a statue with its base.	CIL III, 5871	
Apollini Granno et Sanctae Hygiae [...] Mat(ri) deum ipsorum pro salute Luci[...]	Faimingen (Phoebiana, Raetia)	Apollo Grannus, Hygia, Mater deum	To Apollo Grannus and holy Hygia [...] the Mother of their gods, for the health of Lucius [...].	CIL III, 5873	With Hygia.
Apollini Granno M(arcus) Ulpius Secundus (centurio) leg(ionis) III Ital(icae) cum signo argenteo v(otum) s(olvit) l(ibens) l(aetus) m(erito)	Lauingen (Raetia)	Apollo Grannus	To Apollo Grannus, Marcus Ulpius Secundus, centurion of the Third Italic Legion, with a silver statue, fulfilled his vow willingly, gladly and deservedly.	CIL III, 5876	Dedicated by a centurion of Legio III Italica.
[I(n) h(onorem) d(omus) d(ivinae?)] [sigillum d]ei Apollinis Granni [Imp(eratore) Caes(are) M(arco) Au]rel(io) Antonino [...] [Statil(ius) Di]onysius leg(atus) Aug(usti) pr(o) pr(aetore) [...] Kal(endas) Iunias	Lauingen (Raetia)	Apollo Grannus	[In honour of the divine house,] a statuette of the god Apollo Grannus, in the reign of the Emperor Caesar Marcus Aurelius Antoninus [...], (through) Statilius Dionysius, imperial propraetorian legate [...] before the Kalends of June.	CIL III, 5874	Set up under a legate of Raetia. Dated to the reign of Elagabalus (218–222).
Apollini Granno Sabinius Provincialis ex voto l(ibens) l(aetus) m(erito)	Höchstädt an der Donau (Raetia)	Apollo Grannus	To Apollo Grannus, Sabinius Provincialis in fulfilment of a vow, willingly, gladly and deservedly.	CIL III, 5881	
Apollini Granno Dianae [S]anct(a)e Siron(a)e [p]ro sal(ute) sua suorumq(ue) omn(ium) Iulia Matrona	Augsburg (Augusta Vindelicorum)	Apollo Grannus, Diana, Sirona	To Apollo Grannus, Diana and holy Sirona, for her own health and that of all her household, Iulia Matrona.	AE 1992, 1304	
[Deo Sancto Apollini Granno et de]ae Sanctae Si[ronae] [...] Tr(ebius?) Victori[nus(?)] [omnibus honoribus in civita]te sua functu[s] t(estamento) [f(ieri) i(ussit)]	Lauingen (Raetia)	Apollo Grannus, Sirona	To the holy god Apollo Grannus and the holy goddess Sirona [...] Trebius Victorinus(?), having held all the offices in his civitas, ordered (this) to be made by his will.	CIL III, 11903	
[Apollini(?)] Gran[nio cum co]lumn[is et portici]bus sui[s ... restitutum]	Brigetio (Pannonia Superior)	Apollo Grannus	To Apollo Grannus [...] with its columns and porticoes [...] restored.	CIL III, 10972	Records work on a building with columns and porticoes.
Iovi Gran(no) Apollini P(ublius) Ael(ius) Priscinus optio leg(ionis) II Ad(iutricis) [Imp(eratore) Commodo VI] et Septimia(no) co(n)s(ulibus)	Aquincum (Pannonia Inferior)	Jupiter Grannus, Apollo	To Jupiter Grannus (and) Apollo, Publius Aelius Priscinus, optio of the Second Adiutrix Legion, (set this up) in the consulship of the Emperor Commodus (for the sixth time) and Septimianus.	AE 2009, 1108	Grannus linked with Jupiter and Apollo. Dated to 190. The name of Commodus was later erased.
Apollini Granno et Sironae C(aius) Sempronius Urbanus proc(urator) Aug(usti)	Sarmizegetusa (Dacia)	Apollo Grannus, Sirona	To Apollo Grannus and Sirona, Gaius Sempronius Urbanus, procurator of the Augustus.	AE 1983, 828	Set up by an imperial procurator.
Apollini Granno Q(uintus) Lusius Sabinianus proc(urator) Aug(usti) v(otum) s(olvit) l(ibens) m(erito)	Inveresk (Britain)	Apollo Grannus	To Apollo Grannus, Quintus Lusius Sabinianus, procurator of the Augustus, fulfilled his vow willingly and deservedly.	RIB 2132	Set up by an imperial procurator.
Apollini Granno et Sanctae Sironae sacrum	Rome	Apollo Grannus, Sirona	Sacred to Apollo Grannus and holy Sirona.	CIL VI, 36	
Apollini Granno donum Ammillius Constans praef(ectus) templi ipsius v(otum) s(olvit) l(ibens) l(aetus) m(erito)	Fycklinge, Västmanland (Sweden)	Apollo Grannus	To Apollo Grannus, as a gift, Ammillius Constans, prefect of his temple, fulfilled his vow willingly, gladly and deservedly.	CIL XIII, 10036,60	Inscribed on a bronze vessel found in a burial mound beyond the empire, probably taken from a sanctuary of the god. The dedicant styles himself 'prefect of his temple'.
Apollini Granno M(arcus) Baebius Urvinianus (centurio) leg(ionis) VIII Aug(ustae) d(onum) d(edit)	Unknown provenance	Apollo Grannus	To Apollo Grannus, Marcus Baebius Urvinianus, centurion of the Eighth Augustan Legion, gave (this) as a gift.	Bender 2022	On a silver trulla (a handled pan), its handle now lost. Set up by a centurion of Legio VIII Augusta. Provenance unknown. First half of the 3rd century.
