= Wahlenau =

- Municipality
- Coat of arms

- Location of Wahlenau within Rhein-Hunsrück-Kreis district
- Interactive map of Wahlenau
- Location within Germany Location within Rhineland-Palatinate
- Coordinates: 49°54′22″N 7°15′1″E
- Country: Germany
- State: Rhineland-Palatinate
- District: Rhein-Hunsrück-Kreis
- Municipal assoc.: Kirchberg

Government
  - Mayor (2019–24): Barbara Müller

Area
  - Total: 4.46 km^{2} (1.72 sq mi)
- Elevation: 460 m (1,510 ft)

Population (2025-12-31)
  - Total: 228
  - Density: 51.1/km^{2} (132/sq mi)
- Time zone: UTC+01:00 (CET)
  - Summer (DST): UTC+02:00 (CEST)
- Postal codes: 55491
- Dialling codes: 06543
- Vehicle registration: SIM
- Website: www.wahlenau.de

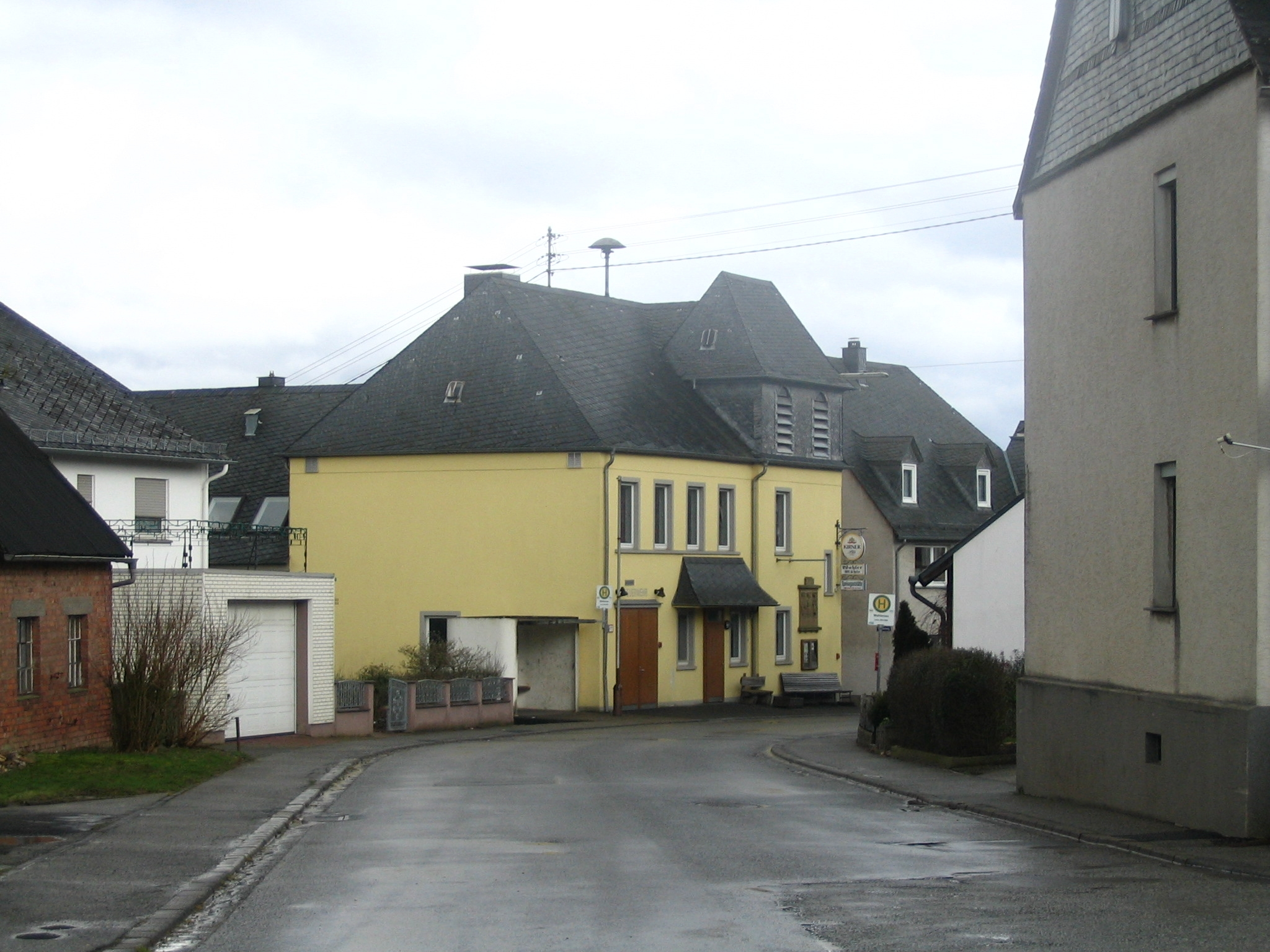
Municipal centre in the village centre

Wahlenau is an Ortsgemeinde – a municipality belonging to a Verbandsgemeinde, a kind of collective municipality – in the Rhein-Hunsrück-Kreis (district) in Rhineland-Palatinate, Germany. It belongs to the Verbandsgemeinde of Kirchberg, whose seat is in the like-named town.

== Geography ==
=== Location ===
Wahlenau is a municipality in the Hunsrück, roughly 13 km west-southwest of Kirchberg and 3 km south of Frankfurt-Hahn Airport. The municipal area measures 4.46 km^{2}, of which 1.78 km^{2} is wooded.

== History ==
Witnessing early habitation in what is now Wahlenau is a group of Iron Age barrows in District 5 in the municipal forest. Archaeological finds from these are to be found at the Rheinisches Landesmuseum Bonn. Roman potsherds are also found on the Via Ausonia (or Ausoniusstraße in German), which forms the southern municipal limit. According to a document from King Albrecht dated 27 October 1301, Count Johann II of Sponheim-Kreuznach held the Sohren Imperial fief, to which Wahlenau also belonged. Beginning in 1794, Wahlenau lay under French rule. In 1815, it was assigned to the Kingdom of Prussia at the Congress of Vienna. Since 1946, it has been part of the then newly founded state of Rhineland-Palatinate. In 1961, the Evangelical church was built.

== Politics ==
=== Municipal council ===
The council is made up of 6 council members, who were elected by majority vote at the municipal election held on 7 June 2009, and the honorary mayor as chairman

=== Mayor ===
Wahlenau's mayor is Barbara Müller.

=== Coat of arms ===
The German blazon reads: Gespalten durch eingeschweifte, erniedrigte blau-golden geschachte Spitze, vorn in grün zwei verschlungene silberne Ringe, pfahlweis, hinten in gold ein rot bewehrter schwarzer Adler.

The municipality's arms might in English heraldic language be described thus: Tierced in mantle dexter vert two annulets embraced in pale argent, sinister Or an eagle displayed sable armed and langued gules and in base chequy of twelve azure and of the third.

The "embraced" (that is, linked) rings on the dexter (armsbearer's right, viewer's left) side refer to the prehistoric arm rings that were recovered in the Zappenheck forest district. The charge on the sinister (armsbearer's left, viewer's right) side is the Imperial Eagle, held to refer to the time when Wahlenau was an Imperial estate, part of the Pflege (literally "care", but in this context taken to mean "administrative area") of Sohren, which in 1301 King Albrecht gave to the Counts of Sponheim, who themselves are represented in the arms by the “chequy” base. These two tinctures, blue and gold, stood for the "Further" County (there was also a neighbouring "Hinder" County of Sponheim, whose arms were chequy, too, but red and silver instead), to which Wahlenau belonged.

The arms have been borne since 2000.
