= Sirona (goddess) =

Ancient Celtic healing goddess

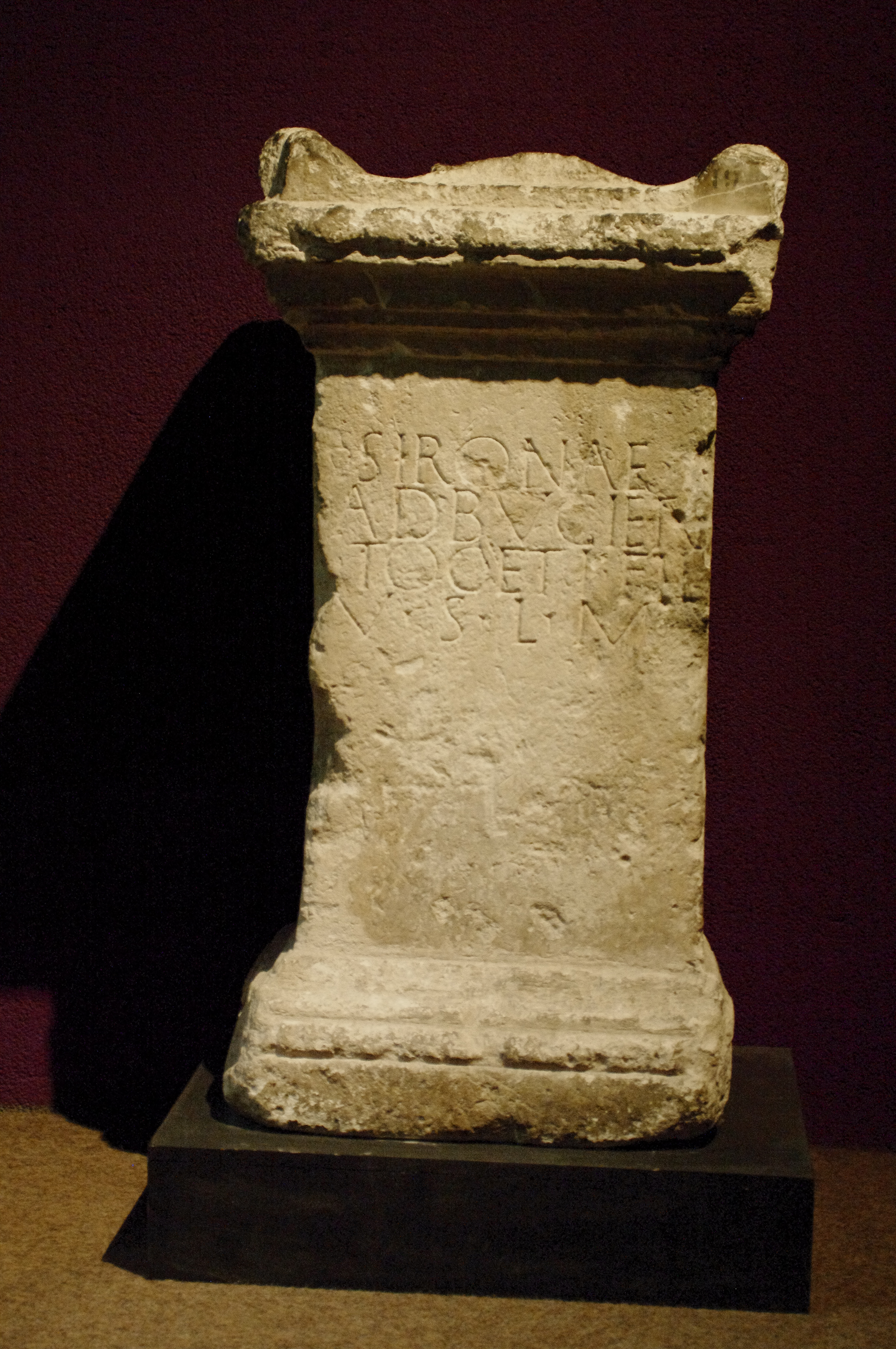
Inscription to Sirona, found in Bordeaux (France)

Sirona (also Đirona or Dirona) was an ancient Celtic goddess of healing, associated with curative and thermal springs, worshipped in eastern Gaul, the Germanies and the Danube provinces. She is attested chiefly as the consort of Apollo under his healing surname Grannus, appearing with him in a large group of Latin dedications and reliefs, though a number of dedications name her alone. Her most distinctive attributes are the snake and a bowl of eggs, taken as emblems of healing and renewal. No classical author names her, the evidence being epigraphic and iconographic.

== Name ==
The goddess is named only in Latin inscriptions, most often as Sirona. The initial is also written as D, giving Dirona. On an altar at the sanctuary of Hochscheid the S is cut with a horizontal stroke through it, a device used for a Gaulish sound that Latin could not represent. This alternation between S and D is generally taken to indicate an initial derived from st or ts, elsewhere represented by the tau gallicum Đ, giving the underlying form *Stirona.

The name is formed with the theonymic suffix -ona, which recurs in the names of other Gaulish goddesses such as Epona, Matrona and Damona. Most scholars derive its first element from the Proto-Indo-European word for 'star', *h₂ster, which gives Proto-Celtic *sterā-, so that the name means something like 'star (goddess)'. Ranko Matasović notes that Sirona, if it belongs to this root, may preserve the lengthened grade *stīr-ōnā.

A different derivation connects the name with a Celtic word for 'ox' or 'heifer'. On this reading Sirona is directly comparable to Damona, whose name is taken as 'divine ox', and to the Galatian dynastic name Deiotaros 'divine bull'.

== Cult ==
Sirona was the consort of the Celtic Apollo, most often invoked under the surname Grannus, a god of healing and of thermal springs. According to Cassius Dio, the emperor Caracalla sought a cure from Apollo Grannus, as well as from Asclepius and Serapis, which shows the standing of the healing god in the early 3rd century AD. In several dedications her partner is named simply Apollo, without the surname Grannus, and in one he is Apollo Sol.

Her cult was concentrated in the Germanies and eastern Gaul, above all in the valley of the upper Moselle, among the Treveri, and in the Mainz area. Dedications also come from the territories of the Aedui and the Leuci, and from further afield: the Danube provinces of Raetia, Noricum and Pannonia, the province of Dacia, and the city of Rome. An early dedication from Bordeaux, set up by a man with a Celtic name, stands somewhat apart from this main distribution. The god Grannus himself had a still wider cult, reaching Grand in the Vosges, Aachen (Aquae Granni), Rome, and as far as Scotland and Sweden.

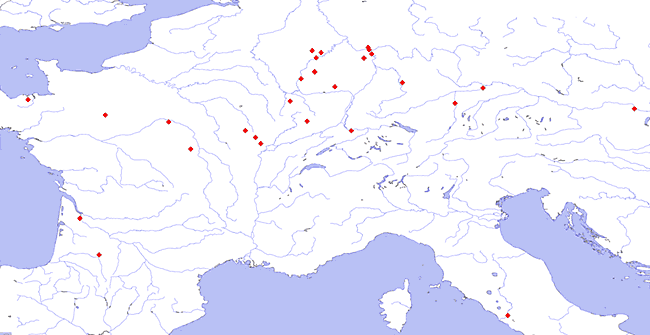
Map showing the distribution of Sirona inscriptions and representations

The people who dedicated to Sirona include imperial procurators, town councillors, a legionary veteran, wardens of temples and, frequently, women. (Note: Those named in the inscriptions include the procurators Gaius Sempronius Urbanus and Quintus Axius Aelianus at Sarmizegetusa, a decurion of the colony at Aquincum, the veteran Gaius Longinius Speratus at Großbottwar, a curator templi at Wiesbaden, and the women Iulia Frontina at Oppenheim and Iulia Matrona at Augsburg.) A number of dedications name Sirona on her own, without Apollo, which is taken to show that she had an independent standing and was not merely a female counterpart to the god. She occurs alone at Bordeaux, Trier, Mühlburg, Wiesbaden and Mainz, among other places. At Corseul in Brittany she is named Tsirona and is invoked together with the numen of the emperor, a pairing that points to her high standing.

Her most important sanctuary was at Hochscheid, in the Hunsrück between Trier and Mainz, in the land of the Treveri, who took a particular interest in her cult. In the 2nd century AD a temple was built around a spring whose water fed a small cistern, and visitors left figurines, coins and other offerings. The shrine was richly furnished for so remote a place and may have been paid for by the owner of a nearby villa. From it come two cult statues that rank among the finest works of Romano-Celtic art. Apollo is shown in classical guise, a young naked god resting his lyre on his griffin. Sirona wears a long robe and a diadem, a snake is coiled round one forearm, and in her other hand she holds a bowl of three eggs. At this site Apollo's surname is not given, but he is taken to be the Apollo Grannus found with Sirona at other Treveran shrines, such as the spring of Apollo and Sirona at Bitburg.

== Interpretation ==
Sirona is generally understood as a goddess of healing and fertility attached to curative springs. Her iconography supports this reading. The snake is a symbol of fertility, healing and the underworld, and the eggs held with it stand for renewal. The same pairing of a snake with grain or fruit recurs for the related healing goddess Damona, whose surviving image at Alesia shows a head crowned with ears of grain and a hand entwined with a snake. The serpent is one of a set of native animal attributes, comparable to the bear of Artio and the stag of Cernunnos. In other images Sirona holds fruit and ears of grain, as at Sainte-Fontaine, or grapes, as at Mainz, and small clay figurines show her seated like a mother goddess with a small dog, perhaps present as a healer.

Because her name is usually derived from a word for 'star', Sirona has also been read as an astral deity. Jan de Vries took her, with caution, as possible evidence for a Celtic cult of the stars. Paul-Marie Duval held that her association with the solar Apollo confirmed the astral reading. Helmut Birkhan counts her among the celestial deities, as the consort of the sun god. In her role as a deity with healing powers, Birkhan also likens her to the mother goddesses. On the competing derivation from a word for 'ox', she would instead belong with the bovine deities.

The pairing of Sirona with Apollo Grannus belongs to a well-known type of Gallo-Roman divine couple, in which the god bears a Roman name, or a Roman name with a Celtic surname, while the goddess keeps a purely Celtic one. Bernhard Maier suggests that the different treatment of the two names may have expressed the subordination of the native goddess to the Roman god. Edith Mary Wightman read the same pattern as a reflection of conquerors marrying local women.

Because her images occur both alone and with Apollo, James MacKillop argues that Sirona existed as a goddess of fertility and healing before the Roman period and survived the fusion of Gaulish and Roman religion. He adds that her cult was later displaced by that of Borvo over much of the Celtic world.

== Epigraphy ==
Sirona is named in some thirty Latin dedications, most of them from eastern Gaul and the Germanies, with a further group from the Danube provinces and a single dedication from Rome. She is most often paired with Apollo under his healing surname Grannus, though several dedications name her alone. (Note: A dedication to Apollo, Sirona and the Nymphae loci from Walschbronn (Moselle) is classed among the inscriptiones falsae at CIL XIII, 630* and is not included here.)

Text	Find-spot	Divine name(s)	Translation	Reference	Comments
Sironae Adbucietus Toceti fil(ius) v(otum) s(olvit) l(ibens) m(erito)	Bordeaux (Burdigala, Aquitania)	Sirona	To Sirona, Adbucietus son of Tocetus fulfilled his vow willingly and deservedly.	CIL XIII, 582	Sirona named alone. Dedicated by a man bearing a Celtic name. Dated to the first half of the 1st century AD.
[Sir]onae(?) M(arcus) Sulpicius Primulus [...] Turiassone(n)sis seviral(is) d(e) s(ua) p(ecunia) f(aciendum) c(uravit) [...] Sulpicius Sacuro f(ilius) [...] Sulpicia Censorina f(ilia) [...] Sulpicia Phoebe l(iberta)	Bordeaux (Burdigala, Aquitania)	Sirona (?)	To Sirona(?), Marcus Sulpicius Primulus, of Turiaso, member of the college of seviri, had this made at his own expense [...] Sulpicius Sacuro, his son [...] Sulpicia Censorina, his daughter [...] Sulpicia Phoebe, his freedwoman.	CIL XIII, 586	Divine name restored. Set up by a sevir from Turiaso (Tarazona) in Hispania with members of his household.
Aug(usto) Ap{p}ollini et deae Sironae usibusque vicanorum Nogeomgiensium(!) Pietonius Rufus	Flavigny (Bituriges)	Apollo, Sirona	To the Augustus, to Apollo and the goddess Sirona, and for the use of the villagers of Nogeomgus(?), Pietonius Rufus.	ILTG 169	Set up for the benefit of the inhabitants of a vicus, with the living emperor. The vicus name is corrupt.
[Apollini] et S[iro]n(a)e(?) [...]	Alise-Sainte-Reine (Alesia, Mandubii)	Apollo (?), Sirona (?)	To Apollo and Sirona(?) [...]	CIL XIII, 11243	Both names restored. Reading uncertain.
Seronae Siveli[ae(?)] Sex(tus) Aemil(ius) Natali[s] lib(ertus) Faustu[s ...]	Le Mans	Sirona	To Sirona Sivelia(?), Sextus Aemilius Natalis, the freedman Faustus [...]	AE 1984, 642	Sirona named alone, the name cut as Serona, perhaps with a byname Sivelia. Dedicated by a freedman.
[Deo(?) Apol]lini et de[ae Sironae(?) ...] et T(itus) Censor[inius(?) ...]	Nuits-Saint-Georges (Aedui)	Apollo (?), Sirona (?)	To the god(?) Apollo and the goddess(?) Sirona(?) [...] and Titus Censorinius(?) [...]	AE 1994, 1225	Both divine names restored. Territory of the Aedui.
deae Dirona(e) L(ucius) Lucanius Censor[i]nu[s] sigillum d(onum) d(edit)	Trier (Augusta Treverorum, Treveri)	Sirona	To the goddess Sirona, Lucius Lucanius Censorinus gave this statuette as a gift.	CIL XIII, 3662	Sirona named alone, the name cut as Dirona. The dedication accompanied a statuette (sigillum).
In h(onorem) d(omus) d(ivinae) Apollin[i Granno] et Siro[nae ...]	Bitburg (Beda, Treveri)	Apollo Grannus, Sirona	In honour of the divine house, to Apollo Grannus and Sirona [...]	CIL XIII, 4129	Apollo's epithet Grannus restored. Territory of the Treveri.
De[ae Sirona]e aedem [cum suis or]namentis M[...] v(otum) s(olvit) l(ibens) l(aetus) m(erito)	Niedaltdorf (Treveri)	Sirona	To the goddess Sirona, [...] (dedicated) the shrine with its ornaments and fulfilled his vow willingly, gladly and deservedly.	CIL XIII, 4235c	Sirona named alone. A shrine (aedes) with its ornaments. From the same site as a dedication to Mercury and Rosmerta (CIL XIII, 4237).
Apollini et Sironae Biturix Iulii f(ilius) d(edit)	Tranqueville-Graux (Leuci)	Apollo, Sirona	To Apollo and Sirona, Biturix son of Iulius gave (this).	CIL XIII, 4661	Dedicated by a man bearing a Celtic name. Territory of the Leuci.
Deo Apollini et Sanct(a)e Siron(a)e [...] r(eficiundum) c(uravit) pro coniu[g]e feci[t]	Hochscheid (Treveri)	Apollo, Sancta Sirona	To the god Apollo and holy Sirona [...] saw to the restoration, made (it) for his wife.	AE 1941, 89	From the spring sanctuary of Apollo and Sirona at Hochscheid, in the territory of the Treveri.
Apollini et Sironae idem Taurus	Luxeuil-les-Bains (Luxovium)	Apollo, Sirona	To Apollo and Sirona, Taurus likewise.	CIL XIII, 5424	From the thermal site of Luxovium.
Deo Apollin(i) et Sironae Iulia Frontina v(otum) s(olvit) l(ibens) l(aeta) m(erito)	Oppenheim (Buconica, Germania Superior)	Apollo, Sirona	To the god Apollo and Sirona, Iulia Frontina fulfilled her vow willingly, gladly and deservedly.	CIL XIII, 6272	Dedicated by a woman.
Deae Sironae Cl(audius) Marcianus v(otum) s(olvit) l(ibens) l(aetus) m(erito)	Mühlburg (Germania Superior)	Sirona	To the goddess Sirona, Claudius Marcianus fulfilled his vow willingly, gladly and deservedly.	CIL XIII, 6327	Sirona named alone. On a bronze object.
In h(onorem) d(omus) d(ivinae) Apo[lli]ni et Sironae aedem cum signis C(aius) Longinius Speratus vet(eranus) leg(ionis) XXII Pr(imigeniae) P(iae) F(idelis) et Iunia Deva coniunx et Longini Pacatus Martinula Hilaritas Speratianus fili(i) in suo posuerunt v(otum) s(olverunt) l(ibentes) l(aeti) m(erito) Muciano et Fabiano co(n)s(ulibus)	Großbottwar (Germania Superior)	Apollo, Sirona	In honour of the divine house, to Apollo and Sirona, Gaius Longinius Speratus, veteran of the Twenty-second Legion Primigenia Pia Fidelis, and his wife Iunia Deva, and their children the Longinii Pacatus, Martinula, Hilaritas and Speratianus, set up a temple with statues on their own land and fulfilled their vow willingly, gladly and deservedly, in the consulship of Mucianus and Fabianus.	CIL XIII, 6458	A temple (aedes) with statues, set up by a legionary veteran and his family. Dated by the consuls to AD 201.
[Deae] Sirona[e dis deabus]que im[mortalibus ...] [Pom]ponius Secun[dus ...]	Mainz (Mogontiacum, Germania Superior)	Sirona (with the immortal gods and goddesses)	To the goddess Sirona and all the immortal gods and goddesses [...] Pomponius Secundus [...]	CIL XIII, 6753	Fragmentary.
Sironae C(aius) Iuli(us) Restitutus c(urator) templ(i) d(e) s(uo) p(osuit)	Wiesbaden (Aquae Mattiacorum, Germania Superior)	Sirona	To Sirona, Gaius Iulius Restitutus, warden of the temple, set this up at his own expense.	CIL XIII, 7570	Sirona named alone. Set up by a temple warden (curator templi). From the thermal site of Aquae Mattiacorum.
Apollin(i) et S[i]rona(e) [...]	Alzey (Altiaia, Germania Superior)	Apollo, Sirona	To Apollo and Sirona [...]	AE 1933, 140	Fragmentary.
A[ram] Ap[ollini] et S[ironae] P(ublius) V[...]niu[s ...]	Alzey (Altiaia, Germania Superior)	Apollo, Sirona	The altar, to Apollo and Sirona, Publius V[...]nius [...]	AE 1933, 141	An altar. Both divine names largely restored.
Apollini et Sironae Genial(i)s v(otum) s(olvit) l(ibens) m(erito)	Augst (Augusta Raurica, Germania Superior)	Apollo, Sirona	To Apollo and Sirona, Genialis fulfilled his vow willingly and deservedly.	TitHelv 562	On a bronze plaque.
[...] Serona[e ...]	Augst (Augusta Raurica, Germania Superior)	Sirona	[...] to Sirona [...]	GraffAugst 8277	A graffito on pottery, the name cut as Serona. Fragmentary.
[In h(onorem)] d(omus) [d(ivinae)] [deo Sancto Apollini Granno et de]ae Sanctae Si[ronae ...] Tr(ebius?) Victori[nus(?) ... omnibus honoribus in civita]te sua functu[s] t(estamento) [f(ieri) i(ussit)]	Lauingen (Raetia)	Apollo Grannus, Sancta Sirona	In honour of the divine house, to the holy god Apollo Grannus and holy Sirona [...] Trebius(?) Victorinus(?), having held all the offices in his community, ordered (this) to be made under the terms of his will.	CIL III, 11903	Largely restored. Set up by will by a local magistrate.
Apollini Granno Dianae [S]anct(a)e Siron(a)e [p]ro sal(ute) sua suorumq(ue) omn(ium) Iulia Matrona	Augsburg (Augusta Vindelicorum, Raetia)	Apollo Grannus, Diana, Sancta Sirona	To Apollo Grannus, Diana and holy Sirona, for her own welfare and that of all her family, Iulia Matrona.	AE 1992, 1304	Sirona with Apollo Grannus and Diana. Dedicated by a woman.
Apollini Granno Sironae [...] v(otum) s(olverunt?) l(ibentes?) l(aeti?) m(erito)	Baumburg (Bedaium, Noricum)	Apollo Grannus, Sirona	To Apollo Grannus and Sirona, [...] fulfilled their vow(?) willingly and gladly(?) and deservedly.	CIL III, 5588	Names of the dedicants lost.
[I(ovi)] O(ptimo) M(aximo) Apollini et Sirona[e Ae]sculapi[o] P(ublius) Ael(ius) Lucius (centurio) leg(ionis) X v(otum) s(olvit) l(ibens) l(aetus) m(erito)	Vienna (Vindobona, Pannonia Superior)	Jupiter, Apollo, Sirona, Aesculapius	To Jupiter Best and Greatest, to Apollo and Sirona, and to Aesculapius, Publius Aelius Lucius, centurion of the Tenth Legion, fulfilled his vow willingly, gladly and deservedly.	AE 1957, 114	Sirona named with Jupiter, Apollo and Aesculapius. Dedicated by a legionary centurion.
Ap(ollini) So(li) et Sir[on]ae [...]	Vienna (Vindobona, Pannonia Superior)	Apollo Sol, Sirona	To Apollo Sol and Sirona [...]	Hild 406	Apollo identified with Sol. Fragmentary.
Apollini et Seranae T(itus) Iul(ius) Mercator d(ecurio) c(oloniae) v(otum) s(olvit) l(ibens) m(erito)	Aquincum (Budapest, Pannonia Inferior)	Apollo, Sirona	To Apollo and Sirona, Titus Iulius Mercator, town councillor of the colony, fulfilled his vow willingly and deservedly.	AE 1982, 806	The name is cut as Serana. Dedicated by a decurion of the colonia.
Apollini Granno et Sironae C(aius) Sempronius Urbanus proc(urator) Aug(usti)	Sarmizegetusa (Dacia)	Apollo Grannus, Sirona	To Apollo Grannus and Sirona, Gaius Sempronius Urbanus, procurator of the Augustus.	AE 1983, 828	Dedicated by an imperial procurator. Dated to AD 182–185.
Apollini Grano et Sironae dis Praesentibus Q(uintus) Axius Aelianus v(ir) e(gregius) proc(urator) Augg(ustorum)	Sarmizegetusa (Dacia)	Apollo Grannus, Sirona (with the di praesentes)	To Apollo Grannus and Sirona, the attending gods, Quintus Axius Aelianus, of equestrian rank, procurator of the two Augusti.	IDR III/2, 191	Dedicated by the procurator Quintus Axius Aelianus, who also set up a dedication to Mercury and Rosmerta there. Dated to AD 235–238. Classed among the inscriptiones falsae at CIL III, 74* but accepted as genuine in later corpora.
Apollini Granno et Sanctae Sironae sacrum	Rome	Apollo Grannus, Sancta Sirona	Sacred to Apollo Grannus and holy Sirona.	CIL VI, 36	The only attestation from the city of Rome.
Aug(usto) sac(rum) dea(e) Sirona(e) S[a]turninu[s] Satair[...]	(unknown)	Sirona	Sacred to the Augustus, to the goddess Sirona, Saturninus, son of Satair[...]	AE 2018, 1210	Sirona named alone, with the living emperor. Find-spot unknown.
