= Hirschfeld, Rhineland-Palatinate =

Hirschfeld
- Municipality
- Coat of arms

- Location of Hirschfeld within Rhein-Hunsrück-Kreis district
- Interactive map of Hirschfeld
- Location within Germany Location within Rhineland-Palatinate
- Coordinates: 49°53′57″N 7°14′40″E
- Country: Germany
- State: Rhineland-Palatinate
- District: Rhein-Hunsrück-Kreis
- Municipal assoc.: Kirchberg

Government
  - Mayor (2019–24): Alfred Elz

Area
  - Total: 5.09 km^{2} (1.97 sq mi)
- Elevation: 462 m (1,516 ft)

Population (2025-12-31)
  - Total: 288
  - Density: 56.6/km^{2} (147/sq mi)
- Time zone: UTC+01:00 (CET)
  - Summer (DST): UTC+02:00 (CEST)
- Postal codes: 55483
- Dialling codes: 06543
- Vehicle registration: SIM
- Website: www.hirschfeld-hunsrueck.de

Hirschfeld (Hunsrück) (German pronunciation: [ˈhɪʁʃfɛlt]) is an Ortsgemeinde – a municipality belonging to a Verbandsgemeinde, a kind of collective municipality – in the Rhein-Hunsrück-Kreis (district) in Rhineland-Palatinate, Germany. It belongs to the Verbandsgemeinde of Kirchberg, whose seat is in the like-named town.

== Geography ==
=== Location ===
The municipality lies in the central Hunsrück. South of the village lies the Idarwald (forest), and to the north runs Bundesstraße 327, also known as the Hunsrückhöhenstraße (“Hunsrück Heights Road”, a scenic road across the Hunsrück built originally as a military road on Hermann Göring’s orders). A few kilometres to the northeast is Frankfurt-Hahn Airport. Hirschfeld also lies on the Hunsrückquerbahn, now used along this section of the line as a tourist railway.

== History ==
Bearing witness to Hirschfeld's early habitation are several barrows from prehistory and early history on the Roman road between the Belginum Archaeology Park and Boppard (Hunsrückhöhenstraße). In 1353, Hirschfeld had its first documentary mention when its church was mentioned in a document. The church itself has an interesting history, having begun life before the Reformation as a Catholic church, after which it became a simultaneous church to accommodate both Catholic and Protestant worship in Hirschfeld. It underwent expansion in 1748 and 1749. The simultaneum was dissolved in 1921, whereafter the Hirschfeld Catholic congregation built its own church in 1926, and the older building is now purely an Evangelical church. Two bells there date from 1481 and 1545.

Beginning in 1794, Hirschfeld lay under French rule. In 1815 it was assigned to the Kingdom of Prussia at the Congress of Vienna. Since 1946, it has been part of the then newly founded state of Rhineland-Palatinate.

=== Population development ===
What follows is a table of the municipality's population figures for the years 1998 to 2006 (each time at 31 December):

Historical population

Year	Pop.	±%
1998	351	—
1999	350	−0.3%
2000	339	−3.1%

Year	Pop.	±%
2001	346	+2.1%
2002	346	+0.0%
2003	342	−1.2%

Year	Pop.	±%
2004	344	+0.6%
2005	343	−0.3%
2006	342	−0.3%

== Politics ==
=== Municipal council ===
The council is made up of 8 council members, who were elected at the municipal election held on 7 June 2009, and the honorary mayor as chairman.

=== Mayor ===
Hirschfeld's mayor is Alfred Elz, and his deputies are Guido Schmidt and Joachim Schug.

=== Coat of arms ===
The German blazon reads: Gespalten von Grün und Blau durch eine eingebogene, silberne Spitze, darin ein roter Balken, begleitet von oben 3 und unten 4 schwarzen Schindeln, vorne ein silbernes Hirschgeweih, hinten ein silberner Kirchturm, wachsend mit schwarzer Tür und schwarzen Fenstern.

The municipality's arms might in English heraldic language be described thus: Tierced in mantle vert a stag's attires fixed to the scalp argent, azure issuant from the line of partition a tower with a conical roof of the second with windows and door sable, and in base argent a fess gules between seven billets fesswise in fess, three above and four below, of the fourth.

The charges in base recall the family Kratz von Scharfenstein, once the fiefholders and church lords in Hirschfeld. The hart's antlers (“attires”) are a canting charge, referring to the municipality's name (Hirschfeld means “Hart’s Field” in German). The churchtower on the sinister (armsbearer's left, viewer's right) side refers to the church in the village, which is held to have one of the loveliest Late Romanesque quire towers in the Hunsrück.

The arms shown at the municipality's own website are somewhat different from what appears in this article. The division of the field is different, the charges in base are not quite the same, and the tinctures on the dexter (armsbearer's right, viewer's left) side do not match the ones shown at the source cited above. However, the German blazon clearly describes the arms seen here.

== Culture and sightseeing ==
=== Buildings ===
The following are listed buildings or sites in Rhineland-Palatinate’s Directory of Cultural Monuments:

==== Hirschfeld (main centre) ====
- Saint Wendelin's Evangelical Church (Kirche St. Wendelin), Unterdorf 19 – quire tower, 13th or 14th century, aisleless church, 1748/1749; whole complex of buildings with old graveyard
- Saint Wendelin's Catholic Church (Kirche St. Wendalinus), Hauptstraße 14 – aisleless church, 1925/1926; whole complex of buildings with parish hall, 1950s
- Unterdorf 14 – former Catholic school; timber-frame building, partly solid, plastered and slated, half-hipped roof, early 19th century
- Unterdorf 23 – timber-frame Quereinhaus (a combination residential and commercial house divided for these two purposes down the middle, perpendicularly to the street), 18th century; whole complex of buildings

==== Hirschfeld-Bahnhof ====
- Milestone – sandstone, first third of the 19th century
