= Breitenthal, Rhineland-Palatinate =

Breitenthal
- Municipality
- Coat of arms

- Location of Breitenthal within Birkenfeld district
- Interactive map of Breitenthal
- Location within Germany Location within Rhineland-Palatinate
- Coordinates: 49°48′05″N 7°20′04″E
- Country: Germany
- State: Rhineland-Palatinate
- District: Birkenfeld
- Municipal assoc.: Herrstein-Rhaunen

Government
  - Mayor (2019–24): Ulrich Peter

Area
  - Total: 3.68 km^{2} (1.42 sq mi)
- Elevation: 410 m (1,350 ft)

Population (2025-12-31)
  - Total: 348
  - Density: 94.6/km^{2} (245/sq mi)
- Time zone: UTC+01:00 (CET)
  - Summer (DST): UTC+02:00 (CEST)
- Postal codes: 55758
- Dialling codes: 06785
- Vehicle registration: BIR
- Website: www.breitenthal.de

Breitenthal (German pronunciation: [ˈbʁaɪtn̩taːl]; Hunsrückisch: Bränel) is an Ortsgemeinde – a municipality belonging to a Verbandsgemeinde, a kind of collective municipality – in the Birkenfeld district in Rhineland-Palatinate, Germany. It belongs to the Verbandsgemeinde of Herrstein-Rhaunen, whose seat is in Herrstein.

== Geography ==
=== Location ===
The municipality lies on the slope down from the Hunsrück into the Nahe valley south of the Idar Forest in an area facing east inside a bend in the river Hosenbach. In the southwest, the land slopes off steeply near the municipal limits into the Fischbach valley. Breitenthal's range of elevations is 187 m, from its lowest point of 330 m above sea level at the foot of the Schielenbach (49°47′28″N 7°19′34″E), to its highest of 517 m above sea level in the Sangwald/Jungenwald (forest; 49°48′21″N 7°18′30″E).

=== Land use ===
Breitenthal's total area measures 368 ha (3.68 km^{2}), which breaks down thus:

- Woodlands – 44.9%
- Farmland – 43.3%
- Residential and transport – 11.1%
- Open water – 0.3%
- Other – 0.4%

=== Neighbouring municipalities ===
Breitenthal borders on Oberhosenbach, Wickenrodt, Niederhosenbach, Herrstein, Mörschied and Weiden. The nearest major town is Idar-Oberstein on the Deutsche Edelsteinstraße ("German Gem Road").

=== Geology ===
Geologically, the Breitenthal area is characterized by slate (stratigraphy: Hunsrück slate; petrography: claystone and siltstone with traces of sandstone). This arose from clayey/sandy depositions from great rivers on the Old Red Continent that were submerged in a deep sea, sinking to the sea floor in the Upper Devonian and the Lower Carboniferous. These deposits were later folded and, as part of the Variscan orogeny, once more lifted up. The tectonic forces along a southeast–northwest axis during this folding were what gave rise to the almost upright-standing slate areas, which were also thereby given the fissility that allowed them to be split into thin sheets that would be so important much later on to the local economy.

The fossils in Breitenthal slate are either encrusted with a thin layer of pyrite or formed of fine crystals (<20 μm).

The municipal area's northwesternmost corner in the Rhaunen State Forest (Sangwald and Jungenwald) is part of a Taunus quartzite block, whose continuation can also be seen in the higher elevations to the west, namely the Sandkopf, the Wildenburger Kopf and the Mörschieder Burr (stratigraphy: Taunus quartzite; petrography: quartz sandstone and quartzitic sandstone with traces of claystone and siltstone).

Geological risks arise from abandoned mines in the Schielenbach. Not only are their shafts in the ground formerly affording access to underground slatemines, but also the dangers inherent in old slate heaps at the mines.

=== Climate ===
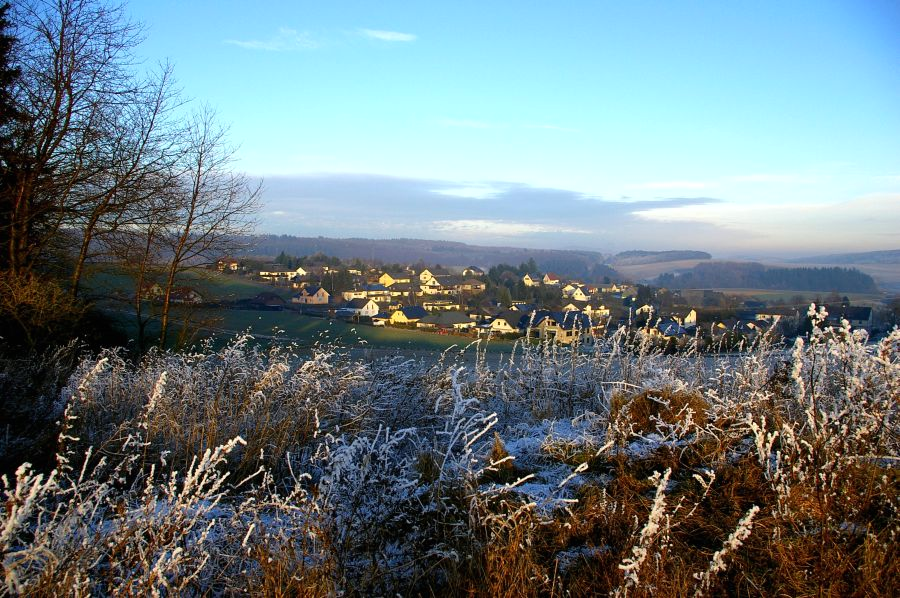
View of Breitenthal in the wintertime

Breitenthal lies in a zone characterized mainly by an oceanic climate with a prevailing wind direction from southwest to northwest. The topographically favourable location of the municipality's main centre in a hollow sloping gently towards the east confers a somewhat more favourable climate than that which prevails in nearby places. Very seldom is there hot and humid weather here.

Because Breitenthal lies alee of the Wildenburg mountain ridge to the west and the Idar Forest to the north, showers and storms, as well as mean and absolute wind speed, are significantly less intense than would be expected given the synoptic structure.

In the odd case when Breitenthal finds itself on the windward side of the Idar Forest, there can be prolonged rainfall and low cloud ceilings ahead of warm fronts as long as the wind is out of the south (between 150° and 210°) and the dew point spread is only slight.

The village is practically fog-free; only radiation fog is seen now and then, as well as the odd advection fog inflow from the Hosenbach valley within the framework of a local atmospheric circulation that forms with low-gradient anticyclonic weather systems.

When there is a slight westerly wind, it can sometimes bring about an advection-induced hill fog on the saddle south of the village (in the training ground area) if moist air flowing from the Schielenbach condenses once it is lifted up. The village itself is not usually affected by this.

Extreme weather in the form of summertime hot-weather thunderstorms arising in the Nahe valley can in times of overlying southeasterly upper air flows be swept over the Hosenbach valley to Breitenthal. These storms are made all the more intense by lifting processes with orographically induced increased strength, leading to unusually great amounts of precipitation within a short time. It was on the occasion of one such event that the lower-lying sections of the village's new development area experienced flooded basements, prompting improvements in surface-water removal systems through changes to the drainage ditches.

== History ==
This timeline shows the holders of the territory in which Breitenthal has lain over the centuries, from the time of its first documentary mention:

The village, which had its first documentary mention in 1282 as Breydendale, sprang from an estate established to supply the lordly family, and together with the neighbouring village of Oberhosenbach formed a Rhinegravial and Waldgravial high court in the Rhinegravial-Waldgravial Amt of Wildenburg. Once the French had auctioned off the lordly holdings to private owners as national property (bien national), Breitenthal could develop itself as a free village.

Archaeological finds from the Bronze Age have led to the assumption that there was human settlement then within what are now the municipality's limits. In the cadastral area known as Hirtenbösch and in the Hardtwald (forest), traces of settlement and gravesites from early Hallstatt times and La Tène times have been unearthed. Furthermore, in the area of the now vanished village of Battenhofen, clear signs of a Roman presence have been found in several spots right near the Roman road.

The estate of Breitenthal (Breidendale) was mentioned in a 1282 document with which Konrad von Schmidtburg transferred the estate to his brother Gottfried von Kyrburg. In 1318, the Dinghof (lordly estate with lower jurisdiction) of Breidindeil was transferred by the Waldgrave Friedrich zu Kyrburg to Archbishop of Trier Baldwin, who at once enfeoffed the Waldgrave with his own former holding as an Electoral-Trier fief. Beginning in 1409, Breitenthal belonged to the Amt of Wildenburg with which it passed in 1515 to the Rhinegrave and Waldgrave of Kyrburg. After the Old Kyrburg line had died out, it passed to the Old Dhaun line of the Rhinegraves and Waldgraves. After this line split, a three-fourths share of the ownership went to the Waldgraves and Rhinegraves of Grumbach, while each of the Salm-Salms and the Salm-Kyrburgs got a one-eighth share.

The Waldgraviate and Rhinegraviate of Salm-Kyrburg – as of 1743 the Principality of Salm-Kyrburg – stood as an Imperially immediate territory from 1499 until the Treaty of Lunéville in 1801. The capital was Kirn. After the Principality of Salm-Kyrburg was conquered in 1794 and 1795 by French Revolutionary troops and annexed by France in 1798, the Holy Roman Empire ceded the country to France in the Treaty of Lunéville. The Princes lived mainly in Paris, where Prince Friedrich III of Salm-Kyburg was put to death by guillotine in the Reign of Terror in 1794.

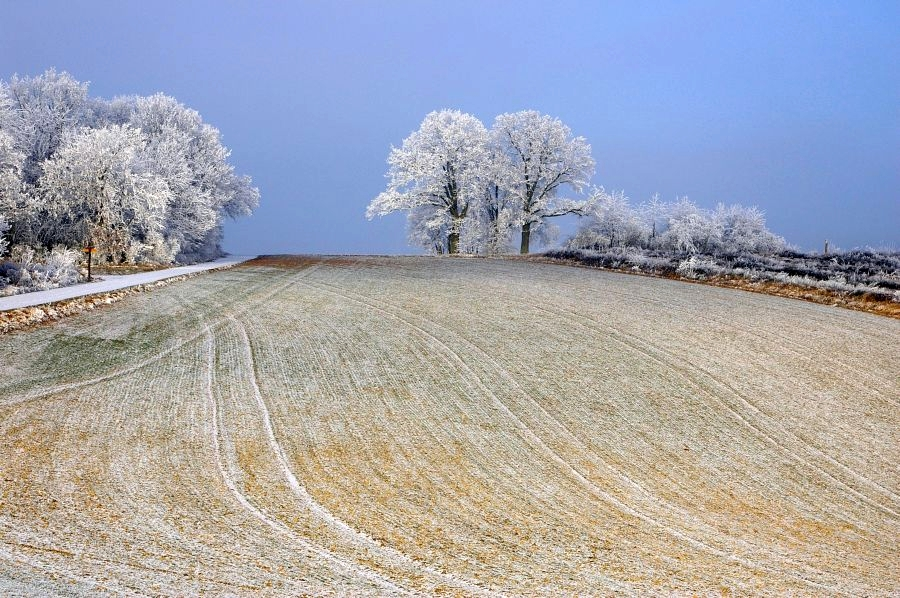
The Jammerseiche in soft rime

In the Thirty Years' War, the region was occupied by Spanish troops after the Catholic League's victory over the Protestant Union at the Battles of Wimpfen and Höchst in 1620, whereafter it bore a heavy burden as Spain's unwilling host. No documents about Breitenthal from this time are known, but according to oral history, a number of people from both Breitenthal and Niederhosenbach who had tried to flee were surrounded by Spanish (Brabantish) soldiers in the area of the Jammerseiche ("Moaning Oak") on the boundary between these two municipalities and horribly killed.

After the Thirty Years' War came Lorrainian invasions and French king Louis XIV's War of the Reunions with the Nine Years' War (known in Germany as the Pfälzischer Erbfolgekrieg, or War of the Palatine Succession). In the face of the Lorrainian troops, the local lords (the Rhinegraves, the Duke of Palatinate-Zweibrücken and the Lords of Oberstein) joined forces in 1651 and, for their small population, fielded quite a large army of 1,700 infantrymen and 300 cavalrymen, who were stationed at the Wildenburg (castle) and in Herrstein, and who were under Rhinegrave Johann Ludwig's overall command. Already in December 1651, and again in 1652, there were two battles between Herrstein and the Wildenburg, which was destroyed as a result of the encounters. The Lorrainians were, however, defeated in both battles, and driven away. A focal point in the struggle was the ridge between the Fischbach and Oberwörresbach, which is visible across the Schielenbach from Breitenthal. Only in 1713, though, with the Treaty of Utrecht, did the area get a chance to regenerate after 93 years of fighting.

With its splintered territory, the Rhinegravial-Waldgravial domain was rather backward, even for its time. Until the French Revolutionary occupation in 1795, the people were unfree serfs who were subject to their lord's ill codified justice system.

The Hunsrück robber and outlaw Johannes Bückler, known as Schinderhannes, was suspected of having committed an offence in Breitenthal. During an interrogation that included 565 questions, he was asked in Question 297 whether he "also [knew] nothing about the theft of beehives that happened to Philipp Dörr of Breitenthal, in the month of Vendémiaire last in the garden abutting his house". Schinderhannes denied any knowledge.

Between 15 and 17 December 1795, there were clashes between French and Austrian troops on a line from Hennweiler through Wickenrodt to Asbach, and therefore in the Breitenthal area, too. The Austrians were overwhelmed and retreated. The neighbouring, Sponheim village, Niederhosenbach, was sternly punished by the French for supporting the Austrians. On 30 December 1795, a ceasefire went into effect, after which Breitenthal, along with the rest of the region, came into French hands.

Under Napoleonic administration after the conquest of the lands on the Rhine's left bank in 1795, Breitenthal was a commune in the Mairie ("Mayoralty") of Hottenbach in the canton of Herrstein in the arrondissement of Birkenfeld in the Department of Sarre, established in 1798 as part of the French First Republic, becoming in 1804 the First French Empire. This, at least, spelt the end of serfdom for the local inhabitants; the Rhinegraves and Waldgraves lost their privileges over the peasants, who could now fish and hunt more or less unhindered. Tithes were abolished, and equality before the law and the freedom to settle were enacted. The local inhabitants became free French citizens, with all attendant rights and obligations, after the Treaty of Lunéville of 9 February 1801. The Code civil was introduced. Disadvantageous, though, were the taxes, which were quite high, and the compulsory military service.

The French era ended in January 1814 with the occupation by Blücher's Russian troops. The region first found itself under the Generalgouvernement Mittelrhein, a provisory body run by the Prussians, but by 16 June 1814, it had been put under the joint Imperial and Royal Austrian and Royal Bavarian Landesadministrationskommission. As of 2 June 1815, the area around Herrstein was awarded to Prussia, and administered as the Oberstein district, on the basis of the 25th article of the concluding act of the Congress of Vienna. In the course of the implementation of the Concert of Europe after the Congress of Vienna in 1815, though, Prussia had to indemnify several lesser rulers with pieces of territory on the Rhine's left bank under Article 49 of the concluding act of the Congress of Vienna. Thus, in 1817, Breitenthal, along with the whole Birkenfeld region from Kirnsulzbach in the east to Selbach (nowadays an outlying centre of Nohfelden in the Saarland) in the west, was ceded to the Oldenburg-ruled Principality of Birkenfeld (as of 1919, this became the Birkenfeld section of Oldenburg).

During this time, the village belonged to the Bürgermeisterei ("Mayoralty") of Herrstein. As a result of this rather arbitrary border (the criterion for forming a territorial unit was a population figure of 20,000), Breitenthal wound up a border town. While Oberhosenbach, Wickenrodt and Weiden were likewise Oldenburg territory, the neighbouring municipalities of Sulzbach and Hottenbach were Prussian territory. This border persisted as a district boundary between the Birkenfeld and Bernkastel districts even after German Unification and indeed as late as 1969, the time of administrative restructuring in Rhineland-Palatinate.

In 1883, there was an anthrax outbreak in Breitenthal that claimed three lives. The epidemic began with the consumption of an infected animal. News of the outbreak appeared in newspapers all over Germany.

Seventeen men from Breitenthal either fell or went missing in the First World War, all in fighting on the Western Front in Flanders, Picardy, Champagne, on the Meuse around Verdun and in the Vosges.

After the First World War, the region once again found itself under French administration. On 30 June 1930, the last French troops left the Rhineland, ending the occupation.

Under §8(1) of the Greater Hamburg Act enacted by the Nazis during the Third Reich on 1 April 1937, the Birkenfeld section of Oldenburg was ceded to Prussia – which was still a distinct entity within Germany even then – becoming a district within the Rhine Province. Thus, on 26 October 1937, Breitenthal became Prussian.

Eight men from Breitenthal fell and six went missing in the Second World War. There were other victims, too: five forced labourers from Ukraine, France and Belgium were used in Breitenthal during the war. Air raid victims, too, from Cologne and Koblenz, were temporarily housed in Breitenthal, particularly at the end of the war.

There was little in the way of fighting in Breitenthal. In the winter of 1944–1945, a fighter-bomber attack on a Breitenthal farmer's horse-drawn vehicle killed a horse. In sporadic skirmishes with advancing US forces, two German soldiers were killed near the village.

The Second World War ended in Breitenthal on the afternoon of 18 March 1945 when the village was surrendered without a fight to US troops of either the 41st Cavalry Reconnaissance Squadron or the 492nd Armored Field Artillery Battalion of Combat Command B of the 11th Armored Division "Thunderbolt". The latter had taken up a position near Oberhosenbach to lend the former some supporting fire, if needed. The fire was instead aimed at German infantry, columns of vehicles and anti-aircraft emplacements. Five German vehicles were destroyed, 15 prisoners were taken and one German soldier was killed.

After the war, Breitenthal at first kept its rural, agricultural structure. With the growth of industrialization, though, farming came to be done only as a sideline; by the turn of the 21st century, there were only two full-time operations left. Although the village has expanded, the population figures have not changed much, despite the doubling of the number of residential buildings, including three designed for several families.

=== Population development ===
Listed here are population figures for selected years – each time as at 31 December – since the Congress of Vienna:

- 1815 – 169
- 1835 – 223
- 1855 – 225
- 1871 – 210
- 1905 – 227
- 1910 – 225
- 1939 – 220
- 1950 – 212
- 1954 – 233
- 1961 – 246
- 1962 – 258
- 1963 – 259
- 1964 – 263
- 1965 – 261
- 1966 – 254
- 1967 – 260
- 1968 – 256
- 1969 – 256
- 1970 – 259
- 1971 – 252
- 1972 – 251
- 1973 – 248
- 1974 – 253
- 1975 – 253
- 1976 – 263
- 1977 – 266
- 1978 – 272
- 1979 – 288
- 1980 – 282
- 1981 – 289
- 1982 – 284
- 1983 – 285
- 1984 – 299
- 1985 – 294
- 1986 – 297
- 1987 – 303
- 1988 – 309
- 1989 – 316
- 1990 – 310
- 1991 – 321
- 1992 – 326
- 1993 – 321
- 1994 – 313
- 1995 – 331
- 1996 – 335
- 1997 – 340
- 1998 – 335
- 1999 – 327
- 2000 – 333
- 2001 – 330
- 2002 – 320
- 2003 – 324
- 2004 – 329
- 2005 – 333
- 2006 – 326
- 2007 – 327
- 2008 – 337
- 2009 – 321
- 2010 – 325
- 2011 – 322
- 2012 – 322
- 2013 – 304
- 2014 – 311
- 2015 – 310
- 2016 – 312
- 2017 – 313

== Politics ==
=== Municipal council ===
The council is made up of 8 council members, who were elected by majority vote at the municipal election held on 25 May 2014, and the honorary mayor as chairman.

=== Mayor ===
Breitenthal's mayor is Ulrich Peter.

=== Coat of arms ===
The German blazon reads: In schräggestelltem Schild vorne in Blau zwei silberne Spitzen mit breitem Zwischenraum, hinten ein blaubewehrter und -gezungter roter Löwe in Gold.

The municipality's arms might in English heraldic language be described thus: Per bend azure a base argent issuant from which two piles transposed of the same, the dexter standing no higher than the fess point and the sinister no higher than the nombril point, and Or a lion rampant gules armed and langued of the first.

The charges on the escutcheon's dexter (armsbearer's right, viewer's left) side are canting for the municipality's name, Breitenthal, which comes from the German words breiten Tal (with the archaic spelling of the latter word, with an H). The base form of this expression, without an article, would be breites Tal in the nominative case since the noun Tal takes the neuter gender. The phrase is therefore presumably in the dative case, in which an adjective takes the —en ending in the neuter when there is an article. The grammatical niceties aside, the words together mean "broad dale" (and are even cognate with their English counterparts). The two "piles transposed" (upward-pointing wedgelike charges) with a flat line between them are meant to illustrate a broad dale between two hills, and thereby recall the municipality's name. The lion on the sinister (armsbearer's left, viewer's right) side is a reference to the village's former allegiance to the Rhinegraves and Waldgraves.

The arms have been borne since 18 May 1962.

=== Town partnerships ===
Breitenthal fosters unofficial but close contacts with the following places:

- (Germany) Breitenthal in Schwaben, Günzburg district, Bavaria

== Culture and sightseeing ==
=== Customs ===
Characteristic for the region and the village are names for older buildings and members of long-established families.

A custom is the Meie in which the village women meet once each month to exchange village news over drinks and snacks. The meeting place each time is a different participant's house.

=== Local speech ===
The Breitenthal dialect is a variant of what is otherwise known as the Moselländisch dialect, also known as Hunsrückisch. In this dialect, the municipality's name becomes Bränel. In a map entry by French geographers in 1737, the village is named as Breneldal.

=== Natural monuments ===
On a hill south of the village stands a grove of trees known as the Jammerseiche ("Moaning Oak"), said in the local oral history to have been the scene of ghastly incidents during the Thirty Years' War. The coppice that once stood next to the grove was felled quite recently, leaving the grove standing alone as a prominent landmark.

=== Clubs ===
Typical of villages in the Hunsrück is a well developed club life. DSG Breitenthal '95 e.V. was the first of Rhineland-Palatinate's now three independent women's football clubs. DSG Breitenthal's Team 1 plays in the Verbandsliga Südwest and its Team 1b plays in the Bezirksliga Nahe.

The gymnastic and sport club TuS Breitenthal / Oberhosenbach is a sport club with a broad offering of activities. The football department's first team currently plays in the Kreisliga West I.

The Singgemeinschaft Breitenthal is a mixed choir integrated into the Nahe-Hunsrück-Chor (choir). The choir is a successor to the Männergesangverein Breitenthal, a men's choir established in 1892. This became a mixed choir after 1919. When the Second World War ended, so did singing in Breitenthal choirs, at least for a few years. The first new choir to arise in the village was a women's choir that sang mainly at burials. Only in late 1955 did the new choir, now known as the Singgemeinschaft ("Singing Association"), come into being.

The Förderverein der Freiwilligen Feuerwehr Breitenthal ("Breitenthal Fire Brigade Promotional Association") set itself up after restructuring of the firefighting establishment within the Verbandsgemeinde of Herrstein. In 2000, a new concept in firefighting came into force, one that took into account the demographic development and changes to commercial structures in the municipalities. The local fire brigades were gathered together in "launching" areas in such a way that each local brigade remained a standalone brigade. This was meant to ensure, especially during the daytime, that enough firefighting personnel were available to keep to the 8-minute response time set forth by law. The Promotional Association supports the Breitenthal local fire brigade with both personnel and materiel.

The Schalke-Fanclub Bräneler Knappen was founded on 1 March 2008 and offers local fans of FC Schalke 04 a home base.

=== Buildings ===
The following are listed buildings or sites in Rhineland-Palatinate's Directory of Cultural Monuments:

- Oldenburger Straße 6 – estate complex; house marked 1856, exterior renovation in early 20th century
- Oldenburger Straße 10 – scattered estate; house, partly timber-frame, marked 1832, essentially possibly older, timber-frame barn

==== Streetscape ====
Breitenthal is, if the new building developments are not counted, like many of the region's municipalities in that it has a more or less irregular assemblage of (formerly) agricultural buildings along the main street (in this case, Oldenburger Straße) without an identifiable village centre.

The Hunsrück Quereinhaus style (a combination residential and commercial house divided for these two purposes down the middle, perpendicularly to the street with the eaves facing the street) is typical for houses in this region. Newer houses were built in the 1950s in rustic style. More lavish buildings in the village are built as scattered homesteads, expressing something of the size of the owner's estate and his social standing. The new building developments are structured and laid out in contemporary fashion.

In Breitenthal, little in the way of old building is still preserved. Of cultural-historical importance is the property at Oldenburger Straße 9, which has a freestanding house surrounded by a hook-shaped commercial wing marked "1856"; as such it is one of the most northerly examples of this building form, which is also rare in this region. Particularly noteworthy are the weightbearing sandstone columns on the commercial wing where it faces the street.

The village's oldest building is a scattered estate at Oldenburger Straße 10 (see above), marked "1832" above the door, which is, however, essentially from the 17th century. The succession of owners is known back to 1660. The Classicist front door with a leaded window, curved panes and old locks, was removed during renovation work in the 1990s. The old schoolhouse from 1840, on whose upper floor the classrooms were found, is in a very bad state and currently stands empty.

New building developments were opened up on the village's northern outskirts in the 1950s and on its northwestern outskirts in the 1970s. As planned, the newer development was expanded a few years ago with the addition of the building plots west of Waldstraße and along the street "Im Forstgarten".

Very recently, there has been a greater amount of work aiming to fill in gaps in the streetscape in the old village to avoid "urban decay" in the municipality's original centre. Unlike many places in the region, Breitenthal has very few buildings that stand empty or are unfit for use.

=== Regular events ===
Local clubs host an annual Carnival (Fastnacht) ball featuring presentations and group performances. The event is organized by the gymnastic and sports club, with contributions from local groups including the volunteer fire brigade's men's ballet and the "Well Informed Witches" (Wohlinformierte Hexen).

The annual four-day ''Sportfest'', organized by TuS Breitenthal/Oberhosenbach, is held in late May or early June and features live music performances on Saturday evening.

At irregular intervals, the Leckschmier-Kirb ("Lekvar Fair") is held, at which great kettles of homemade Leckschmier, as it is locally known (Latwerge in standard High German), are cooked over open fires and marketed along with homemade sourdough bread.

The Quetsche-Kirb was an event staged by the Braun Inn (Gasthaus Braun), at which freshly baked zwetschge (a plum variety) cakes could be eaten in great numbers, mostly with Kirner beer, or singly with coffee.

The Singing Association's theatre group produces a folk play at irregular intervals, usually at Easter, whose contents and language are often adapted to traditional Breitenthal norms. This is presented at the hall with a stage at the Braun Inn.

== Economy and infrastructure ==
Until the late 19th century, crudely worked slate quarrystones were used as a building material. Given the low level of processing that this stone required, it was mined in pits on the surface rather than underground, despite the problematic geological structure of Hunsrück slate. In 1824, when the Oldenburg government issued a ban on thatches, there was suddenly a great demand for a roofing material that did not burn. The thin sheets of slate used for this could only be mined underground because of the difficulty of processing the stone.

Until the early 1960s, high-quality slate was still being mined and processed in the Schielenbach to the village's southwest. The mining rights were leased mostly to Breitenthal citizens by the municipality. Many Breitenthalers earned extra income – often as a secondary job – doing this, even though by today's standards the working conditions were very unfavourable. Local geological peculiarities meant that the slate could only be mined underground, not quarried at the surface: since the slate in the Breitenthal area stood steeply upright, and because only a small part of it was technically exploitable, mining had to proceed right into the mountain. (Around the Schielenbach, many old boreholes can still be found; they all belong to the same mining complex.) Any meaningful processing of the material thus mined could then only be done as long as it was moist from groundwater. This in turn meant that the processing had to be done on site, and this is still witnessed today by the great waste heaps in the Schielenbach former mining area.

Today, the municipality's main economic function is as a residential community housing commuters

=== Transport ===
Breitenthal is crossed by Landesstraße (State Road) 180, which is met by Kreisstraße (District Road) 23 from Wickenrodt and Kreisstraße 26 from Niederhosenbach within the municipality.

The southern stretch of the planned Hunsrückspange ("Hunsrück link") is to come from the Fischbach valley and through the Schielenbach by way of the Breitenthal municipal area, thereby negotiating a change in elevation of 120 m over a distance of one kilometre. To keep the gradient to no more than 8%, extensive alignment measures will need to be undertaken. The municipality's residential and transport areas, at 11.2% of Breitenthal's municipal area, currently exceed the average for Rhineland-Palatinate Ortsgemeinden in the same size class (9.0%) by 27%. The project's implementation will further worsen this situation, which is why this highway's planned alignment is the subject of much controversy.

Bus route 346 (Idar-Oberstein - Herrstein - Wickenrodt) run by Omnibusverkehr Rhein-Nahe (ORN) links the municipality with the middle centre of Idar-Oberstein. Special buses are used to ferry children to and from school or kindergarten in Niederwörresbach.

The nearest railway stations are at Idar-Oberstein and Kirn, from which run hourly trains to Mainz/Frankfurt or Saarbrücken on the Nahe Valley Railway.

Frankfurt-Hahn Airport lies 19 km to Breitenthal's north and can be reached in 20 minutes.

Local, regional and long-distance cycle and hiking paths, such as the Sirona-Weg and the Saar-Hunsrück-Steig (Traumschleife Mittelalterpfad) lead either through or right by the village.

=== Established businesses ===
Breitenthal has two full-time agricultural operations. One specializes in hog raising and fattening. Six other businesses are located in Breitenthal.

=== Service sector ===
Some of the tertiary sector of the economy is based on wheels. Baker's and butcher's services are mobile, and drive into Breitenthal regularly. Even the district savings bank sends a weekly mobile bank branch to the village.

In the way of health services, there are two general practitioners and one dentist in neighbouring Herrstein. The nearest hospital is in Idar-Oberstein.

Breitenthal's Internet access comes by way of a DSL service provider.

=== Public institutions ===
The village school building, dedicated on 19 October 1957, was converted into a community centre after the Herrstein Regional School opened. Besides a guestroom, the building also has a further small lodging room in the basement (the Jugoslawen-Raum, so called after a group of Yugoslav lumberjacks were housed there for a while), which is mainly used as a youth centre and a meeting room for TuS Breitenthal (gymnastic and sport club), and shower and changing rooms. In the attic are both a gymnastic and exercise room and a church room, where the Wickenrodt Evangelical parish holds its services.

The municipal graveyard with its mortuary, built in 1966, lies on the village's southeastern outskirts on Kreisstraße 26 on the way to Niederhosenbach.

TuS Breitenthal/Oberhosenbach has at its disposal a grass-covered sporting ground on the way out of the village towards Oberhosenbach (and actually within Oberhosenbach's limits). Nearby are a small playground and a football pitch. South of the village, on the way to the Jammerseiche, on a meadow, lies a floodlit drill ground, which serves the gymnastic and sport club's football teams as a training ground. DSG Breitenthal '95 has no sporting ground at its disposal in Breitenthal. They play and train at TuS Tiefenstein's sport facilities in Idar-Oberstein.
