= Hottenbach =

- Municipality
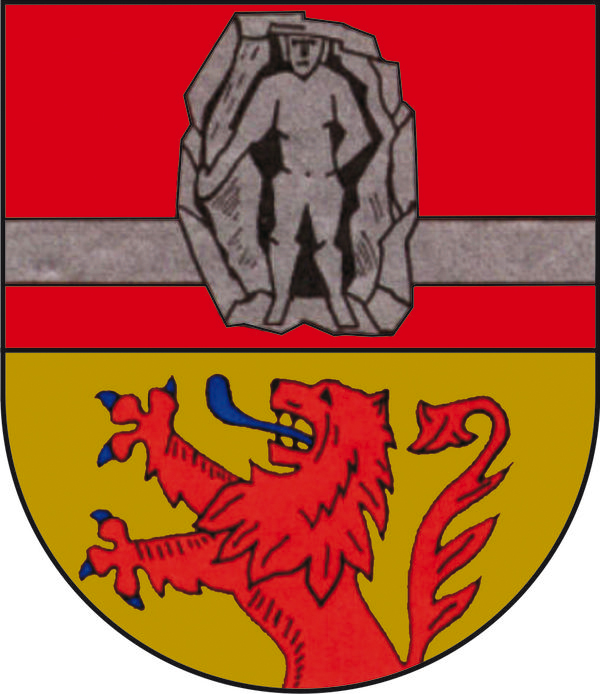
- Coat of arms

- Location of Hottenbach within Birkenfeld district
- Interactive map of Hottenbach
- Location within Germany Location within Rhineland-Palatinate
- Coordinates: 49°49′29.58″N 7°17′53.17″E
- Country: Germany
- State: Rhineland-Palatinate
- District: Birkenfeld
- Municipal assoc.: Herrstein-Rhaunen

Government
  - Mayor (2019–24): Hans-Joachim Brusius

Area
  - Total: 11.21 km^{2} (4.33 sq mi)
- Elevation: 432 m (1,417 ft)

Population (2025-12-31)
  - Total: 545
  - Density: 48.6/km^{2} (126/sq mi)
- Time zone: UTC+01:00 (CET)
  - Summer (DST): UTC+02:00 (CEST)
- Postal codes: 55758
- Dialling codes: 06785
- Vehicle registration: BIR
- Website: www.gemeinde-hottenbach.de

Hottenbach is an Ortsgemeinde – a municipality belonging to a Verbandsgemeinde, a kind of collective municipality – in the Birkenfeld district in Rhineland-Palatinate, Germany. It belongs to the Verbandsgemeinde Herrstein-Rhaunen, whose seat is in Herrstein.

== Geography ==
=== Location ===
The municipality lies on the Ebesbach in the Hunsrück southeast of the Idar Forest.

=== Neighbouring municipalities ===
Hottenbach borders in the north on the municipality of Stipshausen, in the northeast on the municipalities of Rhaunen and Sulzbach, in the southeast on the municipality of Oberhosenbach, in the south on the municipalities of Weiden and Asbach, in the southwest on the municipality of Hellertshausen and in the west on the municipality of Morbach (Bernkastel-Wittlich district).

=== Constituent communities ===
Also belonging to Hottenbach is the outlying homestead of Hottenbacher Mühlen.

== History ==
=== Village ===
The first traces of human habitation go back to prehistoric times. Unearthed in the Vierherrenwald (“Four-Lord Forest”) was a stone axe from the New Stone Age (about 3500–1800 BC). Most archaeological finds, though, come from Roman times. As the Hottenbach church was being torn down in 1903, Roman brickwork was discovered along with sandstone blocks and a hypocaust, which all point to a Roman villa rustica. On Langmes, not far from the old long-distance path from the Nahe to the Moselle, a burying ground with 60 to 70 cremation pits was found. At the municipal limit with Oberhosenbach once stood a small temple. Roman life is believed to have ended when the Germanic invaders came in AD 275 and 276.

The village that stands now had its first documentary mention in 1181 under the name Hattinbach. The name itself comes from the personal name Hatto, which has been linked with the Hattonids, a comital house in Carolingian times whose influence stretched through the years 756 to 843. The seeds from which the village sprang were the two lordly estates down from and up from the church, which were held by the Hunsrück noble family of Wiltberg, who also had at their disposal the local lordship and the church patronage.

In the 14th century, a number of sales led to a change in fiefholders at the two estates to which lordly rights to the village were also attached. Hereafter, the village had four lords: the Archbishop of Trier, the Waldgraves and Rhinegraves, the “Further” County of Sponheim and the Lords Cratz von Scharfenstein. After this last named noble house died out in its male line in 1718, the Electorate of Trier took over their share of the lordship.

In the 18th century, many families emigrated from Hottenbach. Their destinations were the United States, West Prussia, East Prussia and later Galicia.

Beginning in 1794, Hottenbach, along with the rest of the lands on the Rhine’s left bank, was occupied by the French. On 17 December 1795, during fighting between French and Austrian troops, the village was plundered. In 1800, the former Unterschultheißerei of Hottenbach was raised to seat of a mairie (“mayoralty”) made up of not only Hottenbach but also Hellertshausen, Asbach, Weiden, Schauren, Bruchweiler, Kempfeld, Breitenthal, Wickenrodt and Oberhosenbach.

After Hottenbach was transferred to Prussia as a result of the Congress of Vienna in 1815, it became part of the Bürgermeisterei (“Mayoralty”) of Rhaunen in the newly formed Bernkastel district in the Regierungsbezirk of Trier. In 1867, Hottenbach's population figure peaked, at 917 inhabitants. However, the nearby Asbach Ironworks was shut down in 1872 and this led in the years that followed to migration to the Saarland and further emigration to the United States.

In the course of administrative restructuring in Rhineland-Palatinate in 1969 and 1970, Hottenbach passed along with the Verbandsgemeinde of Rhaunen to the Birkenfeld district.

=== Church ===
The parish of Hottenbach, to which the villages of Hellertshausen, Asbach and Weiden also belonged, had its first documentary mention in 1247. In the Middle Ages it belonged to the rural chapter of Kirn within the Bishopric of Mainz. The church patronage was first held by the family von Wiltberg, who in 1290 built a new parish church. On 21 October 1342, Volker von Wiltberg ceded his rights to the church to Archbishop of Trier Baldwin. At first, the right to name the parish priest seems to have alternated between the two estates.

The Reformation came relatively late to Hottenbach because of the denominational rift in Hottenbach: the Electorate of Trier and the Lords Cratz von Scharfenstein clung to the old belief (Catholicism), the Waldgraves and Rhinegraves were Lutheran and the “Further” County of Sponheim was Reformed. About 1600, there is known to have been a Lutheran pastor in the village. It also seems that in these years the church was renovated after a fire. About 1608, the Electorate of the Palatinate, over resistance from the other local lords, posted a Reformed preacher in the village. No later than 1621, though, Hottenbach was once again Lutheran. Twice during the Thirty Years' War there were attempts at a counterreformation: from 1625 to 1629 and from 1636 to 1640, Hottenbach had a Catholic pastor.

In 1701, more pews were added to the church and the galleries were expanded. Furthermore, the church received an ornate pulpit and a Baroque church door with a porch. In French times, the parish of Hottenbach belonged to the Wirschweiler consistorial church. This was united in 1817 along with the Trarbach consistorial church with the Trier District Synod. When the Synod was deemed to have become too big, it was sundered in 1825, and the parishes in the Bernkastel and Trier districts then formed the Wolf District Synod, whose name became Trier District Synod in 1843, after the biggest place within its limits. The branch parish of Weiden was separated from Hottenbach in 1817 when the terms of the agreements made at the Congress of Vienna came into force, putting Weiden in the Principality of Birkenfeld, an exclave of the Grand Duchy of Oldenburg, most of whose territory was in what is now northwest Germany, with a coastline on the North Sea. In 1819, the parishes of Hottenbach and Stipshausen were bound to each other. In 1903, the church's old nave, which had fallen into disrepair, was torn down, while the former quire tower from 1290 was left standing. On 1 August 1904, the new church building, designed by architect August Senz, was consecrated. The new central structure combined the traditional with the modern, incorporating many parts of the old building while also meeting Protestant requirements.

=== Jewish life ===
Historical records show that so-called Schutzjuden (“Protected Jews”) had settled in the Waldgraviate-Rhinegraviate as early as the 14th century, which also explains the relatively high Jewish populations in some Hunsrück villages. Before 1700, the Jews of the Amt of Wildenburg – more than 20 families – lived exclusively in Hottenbach. When the new, more liberal spirit set in under French rule, the Jews were given leave to build a synagogue with a mikveh. The place of worship was also used as a cheder. Moreover, there was a Jewish graveyard outside the village. In 1808, there were 116 Jewish men, women and children living in Hottenbach, giving the village the biggest Jewish community in what is now the Birkenfeld district.

In 1880, Hottenbach's Jewish population amounted to 17% of the village's inhabitants. Hottenbach and Stipshausen together formed a qahal. In 1875, the Jews of Bruchweiler, Sensweiler and Wirschweiler also belonged to the synagogical region, which was overseen by the Chief Rabbi of Trier. In the late 19th century, many of the Jews emigrated to the United States or joined the Idar-Oberstein jewellery industry. When the Jewish community was dissolved in 1932, sixteen Jews were still living in Hottenbach. On 3 March 1940, the village's last Jewish family fled the country for the United States. The memorial book Opfer der Verfolgung der Juden unter der nationalsozialistischen Gewaltherrschaft in Deutschland 1933–1945 ("Victims of the Persecution of Jews under the National Socialist Dictatorship in Germany") in the German Federal Archives lists 16 names of Jewish citizens who either were born in Hottenbach (14) or lived there (2), and who were murdered in the Holocaust.

The former synagogue is today a privately owned house. The Jewish graveyard is administered and maintained by the municipality of Hottenbach.

== Politics ==
=== Municipal council ===
The council is made up of 12 council members, who were elected by proportional representation at the municipal election held on 7 June 2009, and the honorary mayor as chairman. The 12 seats are shared between two voters’ groups. The 2004 municipal election was by majority vote.

=== Mayor ===
Hottenbach's mayor is Hans-Joachim Brusius.

=== Coat of arms ===
The German blazon reads: In geteiltem Schild oben in Rot ein erniedrigter silberner Balken belegt mit einer silbernen Figur mit schwarzem Hintergrund, die Merkur darstellt, auf silbernem Stein; unten in Gold ein wachsender blaubewehrter und -gezungter roter Löwe.

The municipality's arms might in English heraldic language be described thus: Per fess gules a stone argent with a figure representing Mercury of the same on a background sable, the whole surmounting a fess abased of the second, and Or issuant from base a lion rampant of the first armed and langued azure.

The main charge in the upper field is a simplified depiction of a Roman Viergötterstein (“four-god stone”) found in 1903 while the old church was being torn down. The silver fess (horizontal stripe) on the red field recalls the Sponheim and Electorate of Trier colours, a reference to two of the village's former lords. A third one is recalled by the composition in the lower field, namely the Waldgraves and Rhinegraves. Together these three lordships formed the high court of Hottenbach-Hellertshausen. After these two villages were separated, the Waldgraves and Rhinegraves were left with the greatest share of Hottenbach.

== Culture and sightseeing ==
=== Buildings ===
The following are listed buildings or sites in Rhineland-Palatinate’s Directory of Cultural Monuments:

- Evangelical parish church, Hauptstraße – former quire tower, possibly from the latter half of the 13th century, pyramid roof possibly from the 16th century; octagonal quarrystone building with tent roof, additions laid out in a cross shape, marked 1904, architect August Senz, Düsseldorf; porch about 1700; equipment from the former building; three bells: 13th century, 1595, 1628; Roman Viergötterstein (“four-god stone”); characterizes village's appearance (see also below)
- Ringstraße, at the graveyard – warriors’ memorial, pedestal with relief, soldier sculpture, 1920s by F. Ritter and successors
- Ringstraße 4 – house, 19th and 20th centuries, decorative timber framing, early 18th century
- Ringstraße 20 – house, decorative timber framing marked 1710
- Ringstraße 53 – so-called Oberhof (“Upper Estate”); dwelling and administration building with mansard roof, marked 1792; equipment (see also below)
- Schulstraße 6 – former schoolhouse; building with hipped roof, partly slated, marked 1928, architect Nicolaus Coenen, Bernkastel
- Hottenbacher-Mühle/Gerhardsmühle, Hottenbacher Mühle 12 – timber-frame building, late 19th century
- Jewish graveyard, southeast of the village (monumental zone) – 38 gravestones of various styles

==== Church ====
The village's main landmark is the historic Evangelical church with its tower built about 1290, likely built on the ruins of an old Roman castellum. Many archaeological finds substantiate this, foremost among which is the Viergötterstein (“four-god stone”), whose four faces feature Juno, Minerva, Hercules and Mercury. Unique in the Hunsrück are the Late Romanesque ceiling paintings with multiple Christian motifs, in the middle of which stands Jesus. They can be found in the Early Gothic vault of the east tower, and are an anonymous master's work.

A further decorative element in the church is the organ, built in 1782 by the Stumm family of organ builders from neighbouring Sulzbach.

==== Oberhof ====
The most important secular building in Hottenbach is the Oberhof (“Upper Estate”), built in 1792. In 1797, after the lands on the Rhine’s left bank passed to France, it became the seat of a mairie (“mayoralty”), to which eight villages belonged as of 1800. The now restored building is today under private ownership.

== Economy and infrastructure ==
The village, which is characterized by agriculture, is a good starting point for hikes into the nearer and farther surrounding area due to its gemstone and jewellery processing operations.

Serving nearby Idar-Oberstein is a railway station, which as a Regional-Express and Regionalbahn stop, is linked by way of the Nahe Valley Railway (Bingen–Saarbrücken) to the Saarland and the Frankfurt Rhine Main Region. The Rhein-Nahe-Express running the Mainz-Saarbrücken route serves the station hourly. Every other train goes through to the main railway station in Frankfurt with a stop at Frankfurt Airport. Formerly, fast trains on the Frankfurt-Paris route had a stop at Idar-Oberstein.

To the north lie Bundesstraße 50 and Frankfurt-Hahn Airport.

== Famous people ==
- Albert Hackenberg (b. 11 January 1852 in Lennep; d. 30 October 1912 in Hottenbach), Prussian Member of the Landtag, poet and from 1879 to 1912 incumbent pastor in Hottenbach.
