= Weiden, Rhineland-Palatinate =

Weiden
- Municipality
- Coat of arms

- Location of Weiden within Birkenfeld district
- Interactive map of Weiden
- Location within Germany Location within Rhineland-Palatinate
- Coordinates: 49°48′31″N 07°18′07″E
- Country: Germany
- State: Rhineland-Palatinate
- District: Birkenfeld
- Municipal assoc.: Herrstein-Rhaunen

Government
  - Mayor (2019–24): Manfred Dalheimer

Area
  - Total: 2.6 km^{2} (1.0 sq mi)
- Elevation: 380 m (1,250 ft)

Population (2025-12-31)
  - Total: 91
  - Density: 35/km^{2} (91/sq mi)
- Time zone: UTC+01:00 (CET)
  - Summer (DST): UTC+02:00 (CEST)
- Postal codes: 55758
- Dialling codes: 06785
- Vehicle registration: BIR

Weiden (German pronunciation: [ˈvaɪdn̩]) is an Ortsgemeinde – a municipality belonging to a Verbandsgemeinde, a kind of collective municipality – in the Birkenfeld district in Rhineland-Palatinate, Germany. It belongs to the Verbandsgemeinde Herrstein-Rhaunen, whose seat is in Herrstein.

== Geography ==
=== Location ===
Weiden lies on the edge of the Naturpark Saar-Hunsrück between Mörschied and Hottenbach. Half the municipal area is covered by forest.

Weiden has the lowest population figure of any municipality in the Verbandsgemeinde of Herrstein. Within Birkenfeld district as a whole, only Schwerbach has fewer inhabitants.

Weiden lies on the Deutsche Edelsteinstraße (“German Gem Road”).

=== Neighbouring municipalities ===
Weiden borders in the north on the municipality of Hottenbach, in the northeast on the municipality of Oberhosenbach, in the southeast on the municipality of Breitenthal, in the south and southwest on the municipality of Mörschied and in the northwest on the municipality of Asbach.

== Politics ==
=== Municipal council ===
The council is made up of 6 council members, who were elected by majority vote at the municipal election held on 7 June 2009, and the honorary mayor as chairman.

=== Mayor ===
Weiden's mayor is Manfred Dalheimer, and his deputies are Herbert Halberstadt and Werner Kaiser.

=== Coat of arms ===
The municipality's coat of arms are defined as: Per pale sable a hammer and pick per saltire and a miner's lamp in pale, both argent, and argent a cross gules.

== Culture and sightseeing ==
The following are listed buildings or sites in Rhineland-Palatinate’s Directory of Cultural Monuments:

- Evangelical church, Schulstraße – aisleless church with ridge turret, 1930–1935, door frame marked 1764 (spolia); Baroque pulpit
- Schulstraße 8 – Quereinhaus (a combination residential and commercial house divided for these two purposes down the middle, perpendicularly to the street), partly slated, 1854, essentially from the 18th century

Not on the list, however, is the gristmill in the Wiesen valley, which dates back to 1832.

== Economy and infrastructure ==
Running southeast of the municipality is Bundesstraße 41. Serving nearby Idar-Oberstein/Weierbach is Fischbach-Weierbach railway station on the Nahe Valley Railway (Bingen–Saarbrücken).

== Famous people ==
- de:Armin Peter Faust, (b. 10 May 1943 in Weiden), author, teacher.
