= Hellertshausen =

- Municipality
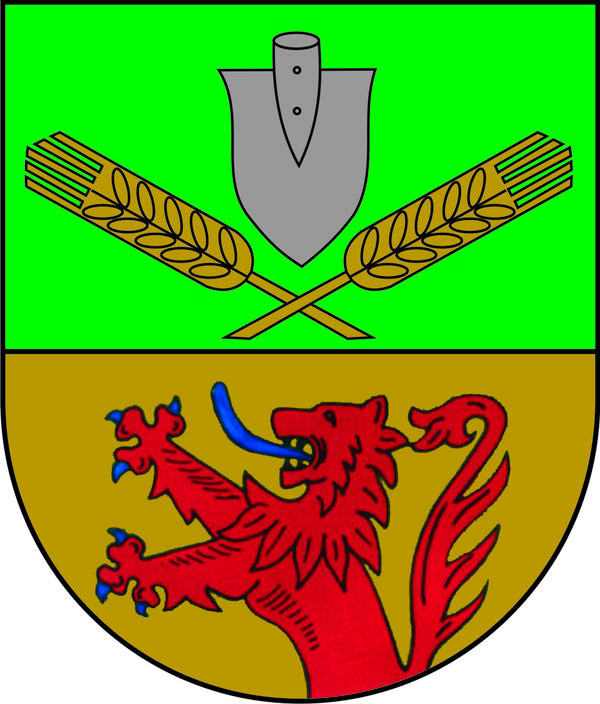
- Coat of arms

- Location of Hellertshausen within Birkenfeld district
- Interactive map of Hellertshausen
- Location within Germany Location within Rhineland-Palatinate
- Coordinates: 49°49′17″N 7°16′38″E
- Country: Germany
- State: Rhineland-Palatinate
- District: Birkenfeld
- Municipal assoc.: Herrstein-Rhaunen

Government
  - Mayor (2019–24): Karl-August Piontek

Area
  - Total: 7.47 km^{2} (2.88 sq mi)
- Elevation: 470 m (1,540 ft)

Population (2025-12-31)
  - Total: 192
  - Density: 25.7/km^{2} (66.6/sq mi)
- Time zone: UTC+01:00 (CET)
  - Summer (DST): UTC+02:00 (CEST)
- Postal codes: 55758
- Dialling codes: 06786
- Vehicle registration: BIR
- Website: www.hellertshausen.de

Hellertshausen is an Ortsgemeinde – a municipality belonging to a Verbandsgemeinde, a kind of collective municipality – in the Birkenfeld district in Rhineland-Palatinate, Germany. It belongs to the Verbandsgemeinde Herrstein-Rhaunen, whose seat is in Herrstein.

== Geography ==
Hellertshausen lies in the Hunsrück on the southern edge of the Idar Forest. The municipal area is 71.2% wooded.

Hellertshausen borders in the north on the municipality of Stipshausen, in the east on the municipality of Hottenbach, in the south on the municipality of Asbach and in the west on the municipality of Schauren.

== History ==
In 1331, Hellertshausen had a documentary mention as Hildertusin.

== Politics ==
=== Municipal council ===
The council is made up of 6 council members, who were elected by majority vote at the municipal election held on 7 June 2009, and the honorary mayor as chairman.

=== Mayor ===
Hellertshausen’s mayor is Karl-August Piontek.

=== Coat of arms ===
The German blazon reads: In geteiltem Schild oben in Grün ein silberner Spaten, begleitet von zwei goldenen Ähren. Unten in Gold ein wachsender blaubewehrter und -gezungter roter Löwe.

The municipality’s arms might in English heraldic language be described thus: Per fess vert a spade sans helve argent above two ears of wheat with stalks in saltire Or, and Or issuant from base a demilion gules armed and langued azure.

The ears of wheat refer to the municipality’s agricultural structure, while the spade recalls the hammermill called “Hammerbirkenfeld”, at which such articles were made. The lion charge below the line of partition is a reference to the village’s former allegiance to the Waldgraves and Rhinegraves, who had the greatest share of holdings in the village alongside the Electorate of Trier and the “Further” County of Sponheim.

== Culture and sightseeing ==
The following are listed buildings or sites in Rhineland-Palatinate’s Directory of Cultural Monuments:

- Unterdorf 1 – scattered estate; stately house, partly slated, 1842, bakehouse marked 1834, stately commercial building, possibly from 1842
- Across from Unterdorf 7 – bakehouse; building with gable roof, mid 19th century
- Former manor house of the family von Stumm, Hammerbirkenfeld – Baroque Quereinhaus (a combination residential and commercial house divided for these two purposes down the middle, perpendicularly to the street), partly timber-frame (plastered), marked 1772
- Former mill, Mombach – timber-frame building on solid pedestal ground floor, trapezoidal gable slated, half-hipped roof, possibly from the 18th century
- Haniels Schlösschen, northwest of the village in the Vierherrenwald (forest) – Late Historicist hunting villa, crossed gable roof, about 1900
- Stable building, Mombach 1 – sandstone door frame, marked 1742

== Economy and infrastructure ==
Hellertshausen has a village community centre.

To the south runs Bundesstraße 422. There is a railway station on the Nahe Valley Railway (Bingen–Saarbrücken) in Idar-Oberstein.

== Famous people ==
- Max Müller-Heid, (b. 3 August 1891; d. 17 February 1973 in Hellertshausen), German painter.
