= Eduard Mayer =

German sculptor (1812–1881)

Eduard Mayer (17 August 1812 in Asbacherhütte – 12 October 1881 in Bad Aibling) was a German sculptor.
