= Langweiler, Birkenfeld =

Langweiler
- Municipality
- Coat of arms

- Location of Langweiler within Birkenfeld district
- Interactive map of Langweiler
- Location within Germany Location within Rhineland-Palatinate
- Coordinates: 49°47′01″N 07°11′17″E
- Country: Germany
- State: Rhineland-Palatinate
- District: Birkenfeld
- Municipal assoc.: Herrstein-Rhaunen

Government
  - Mayor (2019–24): Alfred Reicherts

Area
  - Total: 5.25 km^{2} (2.03 sq mi)
- Elevation: 505 m (1,657 ft)

Population (2025-12-31)
  - Total: 237
  - Density: 45.1/km^{2} (117/sq mi)
- Time zone: UTC+01:00 (CET)
  - Summer (DST): UTC+02:00 (CEST)
- Postal codes: 55758
- Dialling codes: 06786
- Vehicle registration: BIR
- Website: www.langweiler.eu

Langweiler (German pronunciation: [ˈlaŋvaɪlɐ]) is an Ortsgemeinde – a municipality belonging to a Verbandsgemeinde, a kind of collective municipality – in the Birkenfeld district in Rhineland-Palatinate, Germany. It belongs to the Verbandsgemeinde Herrstein-Rhaunen, whose seat is in Herrstein.

For its particularly attractive location with a view of the Wildenburg (a nearby castle) and the Steinbachsee (a lake), the inhabitants sometimes call their municipality the Perle des Hochwalds (“Pearl of the High Forest”).

== Geography ==
=== Location ===
The municipality lies in the Hunsrück. The municipal area is 91.7% wooded. Langweiler's elevation is some 530 m above sea level.

=== Constituent communities ===
Also belonging to Langweiler is the outlying homestead of Forsthaus Langweiler.

== History ==
The area that is now Langweiler must already have been settled in Roman times. When the children's home was being built in 1921, workers happened upon two cists, one of which had a wall around it. Among other grave goods was a coin from Emperor Antoninus Pius’s time (ruled AD 138-161). Furthermore, near the village stand three ruins from Roman times or somewhat later. These are called die Schanze am Schneidberg (“the redoubt on the Schneidberg”), das alte Schloß (“the old palatial castle”) and das Franzosenlager (“the Frenchman’s camp” or “lair”).

In 1037, Langweiler had its first documentary mention as Habschied. In 1237, the name lange willere cropped up for the first time in official deeds, and the form langewillre appeared in 1279. In feudal times the village belonged to the Amt of Allenbach in the “Hinder” County of Sponheim. The village arose in the Habschied wooded district, which is why names for the village such as Habscheid, Habescheid or Habschied sometimes also crop up in old documents. The name was still in use as late as 1730.

In the Middle Ages, the village's field area was made up of five Hufen (roughly “oxgangs”), which were held by five farmers under a Schultheiß. The five Hufen were subject to payment of the Besthaupt (“best head”, that is, best head of cattle) from a serf's estate upon his death to the lord. This levy was later changed to a payment in money, namely 10 Gulden to the Kellerei (feudal administration) of the Amt in Allenbach. There must however also have been at least one Waldgravial subject in the village. In 1515, this was a man named Vix Henne; he had to pay two capons yearly to the Amt of Wildenburg. The Counts of Sponheim, though, exercised both high and low jurisdiction.

The dwellers of the forest region must either not have particularly liked living there and moved elsewhere, or have been compelled by sickness or other misfortune to leave their homes. This might explain the disappearance of Balsbach near Kempfeld, for instance. Nevertheless, when the Thirty Years' War laid waste to so many villages, people once again fled back into the forests. In this time, scattered soldiers and refugees in the Idar Forest supposedly built themselves cabins near Langweiler, Hüttgeswasen and Tranenweier, among other places, and eked out their livelihoods as lumberjacks, charcoal makers, basket weavers and so on. Thus arose the new Langweiler.

In censuses between 1607 and 1699, Langweiler was listed as having no inhabitants, but by 1772, there were once again 13 families who were Sponheim subjects. As subjects who were bound by oath to the Counts of Sponheim, they had free use of the Habschied woods for however many beechnuts they needed for their household swine.

The children's home mentioned above was built by the town of Oberhausen and used as a convalescent home for the town's children. After the Second World War, the house changed hands and now belongs to a Catholic women's order, which runs it as a home for the elderly and an orphanage.

After the Second World War, the village was part of the municipality of Wirschweiler, whose council decided in 1965 to abolish the arrangement and split the double municipality into two. The decision was overturned in the course of administrative restructuring in Rhineland-Palatinate in 1969, but then Langweiler was amalgamated with another municipality, Sensweiler. On 1 January 1992, Langweiler finally became a separate, self-administering municipality.

Because Langweiler is mainly Catholic, it has been given its own parish.

== Politics ==
=== Municipal council ===
The council is made up of 6 council members, who were elected by majority vote at the municipal election held on 7 June 2009, and the honorary mayor as chairman.

=== Mayor ===
Langweiler's mayor, since 1992, is Alfred Reicherts.

=== Coat of arms ===
The German blazon reads: Schild, durch ein schmales, weißes Kreuz in vier Flächen aufgeteilt. Das linke-obere, sowie das rechte-untere Viertel sind rot-silber geschachtelt. Im oberen-rechten Viertel ist auf goldenem Grund ein schwarzes Gefäß, im unteren-linken ein brennender Kohlenmeiler auf goldenem Grund dargestellt.

The municipality's arms might in English heraldic language be described thus: Quarterly, first and fourth chequy of nine gules and argent, second Or a baptismal font ensigned with a cross sable and third Or a charcoal kiln with fire and smoke proper.

The German blazon speaks of a “narrow, white cross” separating the arms into its “quarterly” division, but this is not in evidence in any execution of the arms available on the Internet, including the one on the municipality's own website. The writer has also reverses left and right in the blazon, for these are always told from the armsbearer's point of view in heraldry, never the viewer's.

The two “chequy” fields are a reference to the village's former allegiance to the “Hinder” County of Sponheim. The charge in dexter base, the cutaway view of a charcoal kiln, refers to Langweiler's more recent history after the Thirty Years' War; Langweiler was then said to be the village of charcoal makers and lumberjacks. The charge in sinister chief is an old baptismal font, named in the German blazon simply as a Gefäß (“vessel”). This once stood in the local church, and is about 150 cm tall. It can now be found standing in the local graveyard.

During restoration work on the Haus Marienhöh, an old armorial stone was found in the main building's outer wall. The arms shown thereon have the same arrangement of two chequy fields as the municipal arms.

The arms were designed by Michael Franz from Herrstein.

== Culture and sightseeing ==
=== Buildings ===
The following are listed buildings or sites in Rhineland-Palatinate’s Directory of Cultural Monuments:

- Saint Nicetius’s Catholic Parish Church (Pfarrkirche St. Nicetius), Roter Weg – aisleless church with ridge turret, 1856
- Warriors’ memorial, northwest of the village – terraces, stairway, small chapel, 1921-1931, design by Pastor Nikolaus Philipp

A further site worth seeing is the restored Marienhöh Monastery, which nowadays houses a four-star hotel.

=== Regular events ===
Traditionally held every three years in Langweiler is the Köhlerfest, or Charcoal Makers’ Festival, with its craft and farmer's market.
