= Stipshausen =

- Municipality
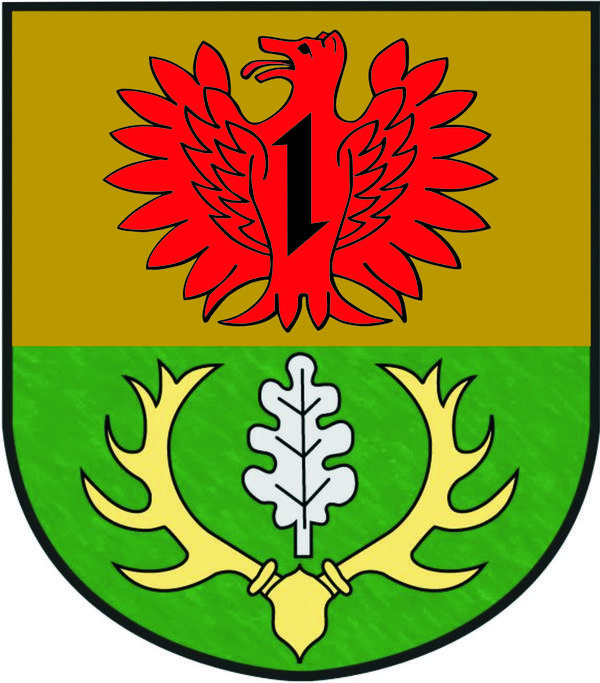
- Coat of arms

- Location of Stipshausen within Birkenfeld district
- Interactive map of Stipshausen
- Location within Germany Location within Rhineland-Palatinate
- Coordinates: 49°50′57.13″N 7°17′22.39″E
- Country: Germany
- State: Rhineland-Palatinate
- District: Birkenfeld
- Municipal assoc.: Herrstein-Rhaunen

Government
  - Mayor (2019–24): Frank Marx

Area
  - Total: 11.11 km^{2} (4.29 sq mi)
- Elevation: 460 m (1,510 ft)

Population (2025-12-31)
  - Total: 802
  - Density: 72.2/km^{2} (187/sq mi)
- Time zone: UTC+01:00 (CET)
  - Summer (DST): UTC+02:00 (CEST)
- Postal codes: 55758
- Dialling codes: 06544
- Vehicle registration: BIR
- Website: www.stipshausen.de

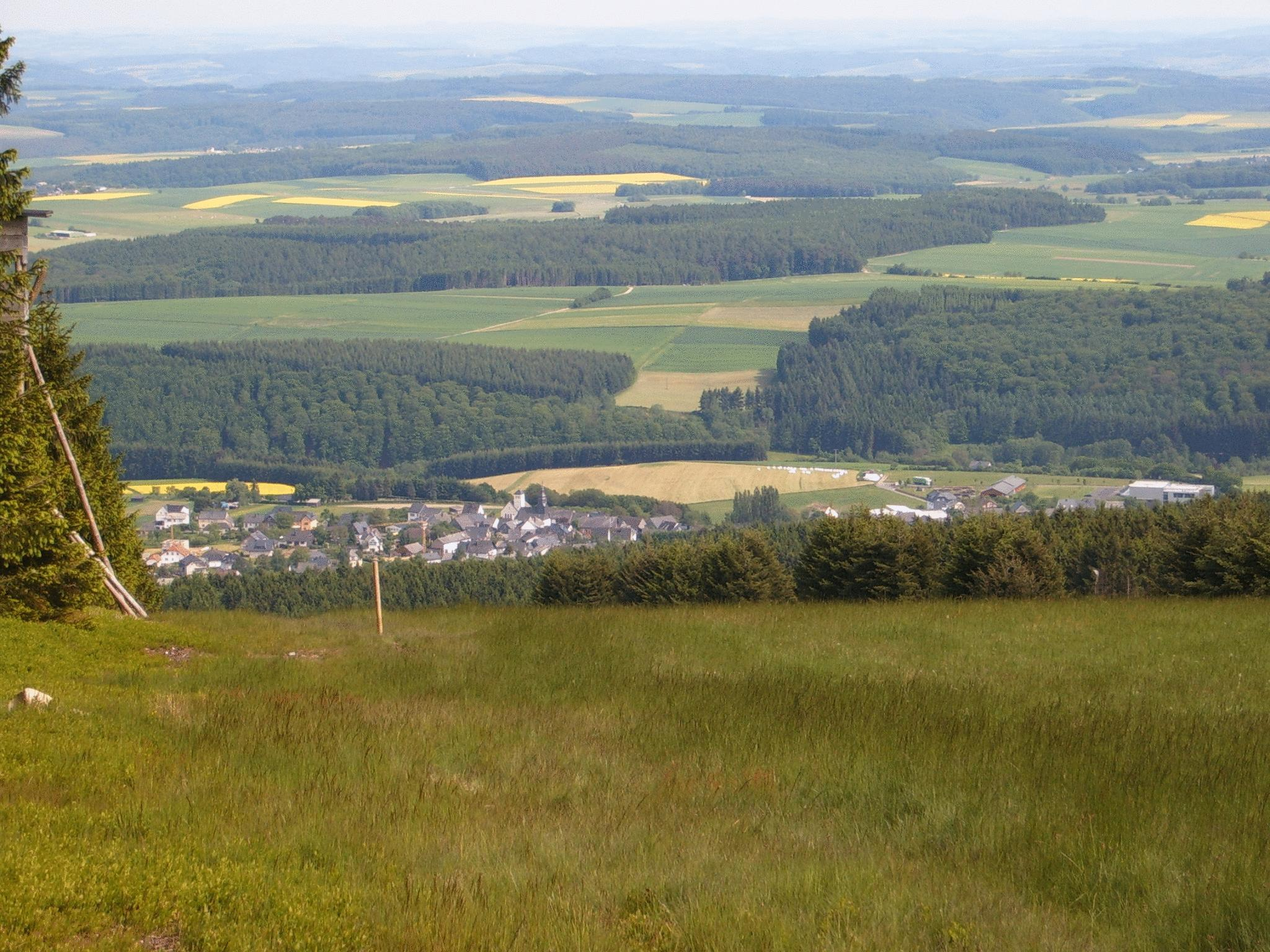
View of Stipshausen from the Idarkopf

Stipshausen is an Ortsgemeinde – a municipality belonging to a Verbandsgemeinde, a kind of collective municipality – in the Birkenfeld district in Rhineland-Palatinate, Germany. It belongs to the Verbandsgemeinde Herrstein-Rhaunen, whose seat is in Herrstein.

== Geography ==
=== Location ===
The municipality lies on the Kehrbach southeast of the Idarkopf (746 m above sea level) at the edge of the Idar Forest in the Hunsrück. The municipal area is 71.1% wooded.

=== Neighbouring municipalities ===
Stipshausen borders in the north on the municipality of Weitersbach, in the east on the municipality of Rhaunen, in the south on the municipality of Hottenbach, in the southwest on the municipality of Morbach and in the west on the municipality of Hochscheid. The last two named municipalities lie in the neighbouring Bernkastel-Wittlich district.

=== Constituent communities ===
Also belonging to Stipshausen are the “Siedlung Heck” development and the outlying homesteads of Stipshausener Mühle, Gerwertsmühle and Lerchenmühle.

== History ==
=== Name ===
At the time of Stipshausen's first documentary mention, the village's name was Stebeshusen. This changed over the centuries to Stibshusen, Steibshausen and, by 1850, Stiebshausen before settling on the current name. It seems likely that different spellings existed alongside each other at times, for although the first topographic map compiled by the Prussians in 1850 featured the spelling Stiebshausen, the Napoleonic French authorities only a few decades earlier had used the modern spelling.

=== Prehistory and early history ===
Several barrows within municipal limits show that the area was settled quite early on. The most important archaeological finds, however, stem from Roman times. Where today the road leads out of the village – near the playground – once stood a villa rustica. Unearthed nearby was a Jupiter Column.

=== Middle Ages ===
In 1334, Stipshausen had its first documentary mention in a church document as Stebeshusen. In the middle of this old document is the granting of an indulgence, which apparently had something to do with the building of the new, but now vanished, Saint Anthony's Chapel. A first documentary mention nevertheless has nothing much to do with a village's actual age. A clearer indication of that is contained in the name itself. The ending —hausen (originally —husen) dates the village's founding to the time about the year 1000 when the Franks were settling the land.

In the Late Middle Ages, the village was made up of two centres: Stebeshusen lay on the Kehrbach's left bank and belonged to the high court region of Rhaunen, and over on the other side lay Smer(le)bach, which had its first documentary mention in 1325, and which formed together with the village of Asbach a court region of its own. Upon the 1515 partition of the Waldgraviate-Rhinegraviate, Smerlebach, which was also known as the court region of Stipshausen, passed to the Waldgraves and Rhinegraves of Kyrburg and thereafter belonged to the Amt of Wildenburg.

Stipshauen, on the other hand, remained with the Amt and high court region of Rhaunen. The lordship was shared between the Waldgraves and Rhinegraves of Dhaun and the Electorate of Trier, with three-fourths to the former and one-fourth to the latter. In 1515, there were 15 families living in Stipshausen.

=== Modern times ===
Smerlebach was from 1619 to 1706 pledged to the family Schenk von Schmidtburg. It was later held as a pledged estate by the widowed Margravine Louise of Nassau-Saarbrücken (1686-1773). When the French reorganized the administration in the lands that they occupied in 1798, Stipshausen and Smerlebach were presumably united. In 1805, the population amounted to 206, reaching 336 by 1820.

After Stipshausen passed to Prussia in 1815 as a result of the Congress of Vienna, it belonged to the Bürgermeisterei (“Mayoralty”) of Rhaunen in the Bernkastel district, which in turn was in the Regierungsbezirk of Trier. In the village itself lived many day labourers and craftsmen, above all bricklayers.

In the course of administrative restructuring in Rhineland-Palatinate in 1969 and 1970, Stipshausen was grouped into the Verbandsgemeinde Herrstein-Rhaunen in the Birkenfeld district.

=== Ecclesiastical history ===
In 1334, Johann von Basenheim, Burgmann at the Schmidtburg, and his wife Getza endowed a chapel in Stipshauen. Saint Anthony's Chapel (Antonius-Kapelle) was at first tended by a rector from Rhaunen who was independent of any monastery or lordship. In 1504, Archbishop of Mainz Berthold split the chapel away from Rhaunen and raised it to parish church with all attendant rights. The right to nominate parish priests alternated between the family Schenk von Schmidtburg (later the Electorate of Trier) and the family Metzenhausen.

After the Reformation had been introduced into Rhaunen in 1560, the parish priest there tended the flock at Stipshausen, preaching this new version of Christianity. The relationship was not altogether free of conflict. Indeed, in 1714, the subjects asked the Kollator (the holder of the altar benefice), Count Cratz von Scharfenstein, to be tended instead by the priest from Hottenbach.

Besides the struggle between Rhaunen and Hottenbach over the priest's position at Stipshausen, the struggle between denominations, too, burdened ecclesiastical life. In the wake of the War of the Reunions, the French declared Saint Anthony's Chapel a simultaneous church in 1686. The Catholics, whose numbers had grown through marriage and migration to 20% of the population, were nonetheless only allowed to use the church for burials. Tension was relieved only in 1778 and 1779, when the Evangelical community built itself a new church on the site of the chapel, which by now had fallen into disrepair, and also gave the Catholic community land and money to build their own chapel. Saint Maternus's Chapel was finished in 1781, and replaced with a new building in 1953 and 1954.

In 1819, the Prussian government in Trier ordered the merger of the Evangelical parishes of Hottenbach and Stipshausen. The parish is today independent and is part of the church district of Trier. The Catholic residents, whose share of the population has grown to 30%, belong to Saint Martin's parish in Rhaunen.

=== Jewish history ===
Beginning in the Middle Ages, the Waldgraves and Rhinegraves had so-called Schutzjuden. There were major Jewish communities in Rhaunen, Laufersweiler and Hottenbach in the 18th century. In 1709, a Jewish inhabitant in Stipshausen is first mentioned. It is believed that the children attended the Jewish school in Rhaunen.

About 1800, five Jewish families lived in Stipshausen, roughly 25 men, women and children. At the census in 1808, however, this had shrunk to 17 persons.

In Prussian times, Stipshausen's Jewish inhabitants turned to Hottenbach for worship, for it was there in 1796 that a synagogue was built. Likewise, the Jewish children had to go there for school. In 1843 there were 32 Jews living in Stipshausen. This number, though, was steadily shrinking. After the Jewish community in Hottenbach was dissolved in 1932, the 14 Jews left in Stipshausen went to synagogue in Rhaunen. After Kristallnacht (9–10 November 1938), the last Jewish family left Stipshausen.

All that bears witness to the former Jewish community today is the graveyard above the village.

== Politics ==
=== Municipal council ===
The council is made up of 12 council members, who were elected by majority vote at the municipal election held on 7 June 2009, and the honorary mayor as chairman.

=== Mayor ===
Stipshausen's mayor is Frank Marx, and his deputies are Manfred Witz, Frank Gräber and Heidi Sauer.

=== Coat of arms ===
The German blazon reads: In geteiltem Schild oben in Gold ein rotes Fabeltier mit einem Wolfskopf und weit geöffneten Schwingen belegt mit einem schwarzen Wolfshaken, unten in Grün ein goldenes Hirschgeweih mit Grind, darüber ein silbernes Eichenblatt.

The municipality's arms might in English heraldic language be described thus: Per fess Or a monster with a wolf's head and an eagle's body sans talons displayed gules, its breast charged with a cramp sable, and vert a stag's attires fixed to the scalp of the first, between which an oakleaf palewise argent.

The charge above the line of partition is a reference to the village's former allegiance to the Waldgraviate-Rhinegraviate and indeed is the heraldic device once used in the Waldgravial-Rhinegravial court seal at Rhaunen. The charges below, the antlers (“attires”) and the oakleaf, stand for the municipality's wealth in woodland and wildlife.

The arms have been borne since 1971.

== Culture and sightseeing ==
=== Buildings ===
The following are listed buildings or sites in Rhineland-Palatinate’s Directory of Cultural Monuments:

- Evangelical parish church, Hauptstraße 38 – aisleless church with stately ridge turret, 1772–1779, architect possibly Johann Thomas Petri, Kirn; décor; Stumm organ from 1861 (appearance new); bell 1492
- Hauptstraße Kaisergarten (monumental zone) – cross-shaped planting of eight limetrees, planted after 1871 on the occasion of the founding of the German Empire, one of the last complexes of its kind
- Hauptstraße 24 – estate complex along the street, partly timber-frame, partly slated, possibly from the earlier half of the 19th century
- Hauptstraße 25 – broad-gabled house, essentially from before 1800
- Schulstraße 3 – former Catholic school; asymmetrical building with half-hipped roof, about 1900
- Zum Idar 2 – small estate complex along the street, late 19th century; characterizes street’s appearance
- Gerwertsmühle, Gerwertsmühle 1 – small mill building, marked 1815; technical equipment, miller’s dwelling, workshop, stabling in the basement
- Jewish graveyard, Wiesenstraße (monumental zone) – laid out in the latter half of the 19th century; 17 gravestones in situ, 1868 to 1940
- Stipshausener Mühle (mill), south of the village on the Kappelbach – stately building with half-hipped roof, partly timber-frame, 18th century

=== Sculpture park ===
Since 2000, a sculpture park has been rising in the village, with notable artists helping with its continual expansion.

== Economy and infrastructure ==
=== Education ===
Stipshausen has one kindergarten and one primary school.

=== Public institutions ===
It also has a seniors’ nursing home and a village community centre.

=== Transport ===
The railway station in nearby Idar-Oberstein, as a Regional-Express and Regionalbahn stop, is linked by way of the Nahe Valley Railway (Bingen–Saarbrücken) to the Saarland and the Frankfurt Rhine Main Region. The Rhein-Nahe-Express running the Mainz-Saarbrücken route serves the station hourly. Every other one of these trains goes through to the main railway station in Frankfurt with a stop at Frankfurt Airport. Formerly, fast trains on the Frankfurt-Paris route had a stop at Idar-Oberstein.

To Stipshausen's north lie Bundesstraße 50 and Frankfurt-Hahn Airport.
