= Oberwörresbach =

- Municipality
- Coat of arms

- Location of Oberwörresbach within Birkenfeld district
- Interactive map of Oberwörresbach
- Location within Germany Location within Rhineland-Palatinate
- Coordinates: 49°46′50″N 07°19′14″E
- Country: Germany
- State: Rhineland-Palatinate
- District: Birkenfeld
- Municipal assoc.: Herrstein-Rhaunen

Government
  - Mayor (2019–24): Olaf Crummenauer

Area
  - Total: 1.40 km^{2} (0.54 sq mi)
- Elevation: 346 m (1,135 ft)

Population (2025-12-31)
  - Total: 112
  - Density: 80.0/km^{2} (207/sq mi)
- Time zone: UTC+01:00 (CET)
  - Summer (DST): UTC+02:00 (CEST)
- Postal codes: 55758
- Dialling codes: 06785
- Vehicle registration: BIR

Oberwörresbach is an Ortsgemeinde – a municipality belonging to a Verbandsgemeinde, a kind of collective municipality – in the Birkenfeld district in Rhineland-Palatinate, Germany. It belongs to the Verbandsgemeinde Herrstein-Rhaunen, whose seat is in Herrstein.

== Geography ==
=== Location ===
The municipality lies between the southern edge of the Hunsrück and the mountain range of volcanic origin of the Upper Nahe. The village itself lies on the namesake brook, the Wörresbach. Idar-Oberstein lies 10 km away.

=== Neighbouring municipalities ===
Oberwörresbach borders in the east on the municipality of Herrstein, in the southeast on the municipality of Niederwörresbach, in the southwest on the municipality of Herborn and in the northwest on the municipality of Mörschied.

== History ==
In 1453, Oberwörresbach had its first documentary mention. It is believed, however, that there was a village here as early as 1259. The part of the village on the Wörresbach's left bank was held by the County of Sponheim, to which the Amt of Herrstein also belonged, and the part over on the right bank was held by the Vögte of Hunolstein. Both these noble houses are reflected by today's civic coat of arms.

An important event in the village's history came to pass in 1933 after the Nazis came to power in the Free State of Oldenburg (this was even before Adolf Hitler’s official seizure of power that same year). One of the new government’s first initiatives was administrative reform for Oldenburg, which was followed on 27 April 1933 by the similar Gesetz zur Vereinfachung und Verbilligung der Verwaltung (“Law for simplifying administration and reducing its cost”) for the Landesteil of Birkenfeld (Oldenburg's exclave in the Hunsrück; most of Oldenburg's territory was in what is now northwest Germany, with a coastline on the North Sea). Through this new law, 18 formerly self-administering municipalities were amalgamated; this included Oberwörresbach, which hitherto had been a self-administering municipality. Nonetheless, it was unceremoniously made part of the municipality of Herrstein.

After the Second World War, in 1950, Oberwörresbach's householders petitioned for “independent municipal administration, as it was in the years before 1933.” Their wish was granted, and with effect from 1 May 1952, Oberwörresbach once more became a self-administering municipality.

== Politics ==
=== Municipal council ===
The council is made up of 6 council members, who were elected by majority vote at the municipal election held on 7 June 2009, and the honorary mayor as chairwoman.

=== Mayor ===
Oberwörresbach's mayor is Olaf Crummenauer.

=== Coat of arms ===
Hunolstein arms

Sponheim arms

The German blazon reads: In schräglinks geteiltem Schild vorne in Gold drei (2:1) rote, quadratische Steine, hinten rot-silbernes Schach, belegt mit schwarzem Dreiberg.

The municipality's arms might in English heraldic language be described thus: Per bend sinister Or three blocks gules and chequy gules and argent, issuant from base a mount of three sable.

The tinctures and charges on the dexter (armsbearer's right, viewer's left) side are drawn from the arms formerly borne by the Vögte of Hunolstein, and refer to the estate that they once held in the village, while the “chequy” field on the sinister (armsbearer's left, viewer's right) side is a reference to the village's former allegiance to the County of Sponheim, and the mount of three – a charge called a Dreiberg in German heraldry – stands for the Amt within the County of Sponheim in which Oberwörresbach lay, namely Herrstein (whose name literally means “Lordstone”). Oberwörresbach even today lies in a Verbandsgemeinde of that same name.

The arms have been borne since 4 April 1963.

== Culture and sightseeing ==
=== Regular events ===
- Brämerekirb (fair)

== Economy and infrastructure ==
=== Transport ===
Running southeast of the municipality is Bundesstraße 41. Serving nearby Fischbach is a railway station on the Nahe Valley Railway (Bingen–Saarbrücken). Two bus routes also stop in Oberwörresbach. These mainly serve to ferry students to and from school. Route 349 runs one bus daily to Nahbollenbach (a constituent community of Idar-Oberstein), while route 351 goes to the Vollmersbachstraße school centre in Idar-Oberstein and on to the Gymnasium Heinzenwies. The two return trips stop in Oberwörresbach only to let passengers alight.
