= Wirschweiler =

- Municipality
- Coat of arms

- Location of Wirschweiler within Birkenfeld district
- Interactive map of Wirschweiler
- Location within Germany Location within Rhineland-Palatinate
- Coordinates: 49°45′51″N 07°10′23″E
- Country: Germany
- State: Rhineland-Palatinate
- District: Birkenfeld
- Municipal assoc.: Herrstein-Rhaunen

Government
  - Mayor (2019–24): Erich Paulus

Area
  - Total: 10.26 km^{2} (3.96 sq mi)
- Elevation: 550 m (1,800 ft)

Population (2025-12-31)
  - Total: 290
  - Density: 28/km^{2} (73/sq mi)
- Time zone: UTC+01:00 (CET)
  - Summer (DST): UTC+02:00 (CEST)
- Postal codes: 55758
- Dialling codes: 06786
- Vehicle registration: BIR
- Website: www.wirschweiler.de

Wirschweiler is an Ortsgemeinde – a municipality belonging to a Verbandsgemeinde, a kind of collective municipality – in the Birkenfeld district in Rhineland-Palatinate, Germany. It belongs to the Verbandsgemeinde Herrstein-Rhaunen, whose seat is in Herrstein.

== Geography ==
=== Location ===
The municipality lies in the Naturpark Saar-Hunsrück between Allenbach and Sensweiler. The municipal area is 69% wooded.

=== Neighbouring municipalities ===
Wirschweiler borders in the northeast on the municipality of Langweiler, in the east on the municipality of Sensweiler, in the south on the municipality of Allenbach and in the west on the municipality of Morbach (Bernkastel-Wittlich district).

== History ==
The question of Wirschweiler's first documentary mention is the subject of much doubt. A document from 975 mentions Werriswillero marca in pago Nahgowe (Nahegau), but its authenticity is very much in question. However, an 1148 document mentions Wernzvilre, and this is believed to be genuine. Over the ages, the name has had several spellings: Wirßwilre, Wirriswillare, Wörschweiler. In the Middle Ages, the village belonged to the “Hinder” County of Sponheim, Amt of Allenbach. In the wake of the French Revolution, Wirschweiler was part of the Department of Sarre, and more locally, of the arrondissement of Trier. From 1798 to 1815, Wirschweiler was the seat of a mairie (“mayoralty”). After Napoleon’s downfall and the Congress of Vienna, Wirschweiler passed to the Kingdom of Prussia. In the course of administrative restructuring in Rhineland-Palatinate, Wirschweiler was grouped in 1969 into the Birkenfeld district and the Verbandsgemeinde of Herrstein.

== Politics ==
=== Municipal council ===
The council is made up of 8 council members, who were elected by majority vote at the municipal election held on 7 June 2009, and the honorary mayor as chairman.

=== Mayor ===
Wirschweiler’s mayor is Erich Paulus, and his deputies are Sascha Paulus and Dieter Neumann.

=== Coat of arms ===
The German blazon reads: Schild durch einen halben goldenen Schräglinkswellenbalken geteilt, vorne in Rot ein blaugezungter goldener Löwenrumpf nach links, hinten rot-silber geschacht.

The municipality’s arms might in English heraldic language be described thus: A bend sinister wavy on the dexter edge Or between gules a lion’s head sinister erased of the same langued azure, and chequy gules and argent.

The bend sinister (slanted stripe) refers to the border brook, the Gladenbach, between Wirschweiler and Sensweiler, which once marked where the “Hinder” County of Sponheim and the Waldgraviate-Rhinegraviate met. The lion's head on the dexter (armsbearer's right, viewer's left) side symbolizes the latter feudal lord's holdings on the far side of the Gladenbach. The “chequy” pattern on the sinister (armsbearer's left, viewer's right) side is a reference to the village's former allegiance to Sponheim.

== Culture and sightseeing ==
The following are listed buildings or sites in Rhineland-Palatinate’s Directory of Cultural Monuments:

- Evangelical parish church, Im Oberdorf 1 – essentially late mediaeval aisleless church, conversion in 1711; baptismal font possibly from the 15th or 16th century; two bells: 1532 by Dederich von Wyncfelt, 1700 by Mahthias Crommel, Trier
- Hauptstraße 10 – former Evangelical rectory; stately building with half-hipped roof, partly timber-frame slated, 1761, architect Heinrich Schunk
- Hauptstraße 25 – cube-shaped building with mansard roof, late mediaeval or from the 17th century
