= Schauren =

- Municipality
- Coat of arms

- Location of Schauren within Birkenfeld district
- Interactive map of Schauren
- Location within Germany Location within Rhineland-Palatinate
- Coordinates: 49°48′33″N 7°14′17″E
- Country: Germany
- State: Rhineland-Palatinate
- District: Birkenfeld
- Municipal assoc.: Herrstein-Rhaunen

Government
  - Mayor (2019–24): Susanne Müller

Area
  - Total: 7.13 km^{2} (2.75 sq mi)
- Elevation: 520 m (1,710 ft)

Population (2025-12-31)
  - Total: 486
  - Density: 68.2/km^{2} (177/sq mi)
- Time zone: UTC+01:00 (CET)
  - Summer (DST): UTC+02:00 (CEST)
- Postal codes: 55758
- Dialling codes: 06786
- Vehicle registration: BIR
- Website: www.schauren.de

Schauren (German pronunciation: [ˈʃaʊʁən]) is an Ortsgemeinde – a municipality belonging to a Verbandsgemeinde, a kind of collective municipality – in the Birkenfeld district in Rhineland-Palatinate, Germany. It belongs to the Verbandsgemeinde Herrstein-Rhaunen, whose seat is in Herrstein.

== Geography ==
=== Location ===
The municipality lies in the Hunsrück at the edge of the Idar Forest. The municipal area is 64.4% wooded.

=== Neighbouring municipalities ===
Schauren borders in the north on the municipality of Hellertshausen, in the northeast on the municipality of Asbach, in the southeast on the municipality of Kempfeld, in the southwest on the municipality of Bruchweiler and in the northwest on the municipality of Morbach which, unlike all the others, is not in the Birkenfeld district, but rather in the Bernkastel-Wittlich district.

=== Constituent communities ===
Also belonging to Schauren are the outlying homesteads of Aschiedermühle and Schaurenermühle.

== History ==
In 1275, Schauren had its first documentary mention. In 1279, it was called Schuren; the name stems from the Old High German Scura. Even so, Schauren existed long before its first documentary mention. As with most villages on the slopes of the Idar Forest, several prehistoric graves unearthed within Schauren's limits bear witness to very early settlers here, even as far back as the early Celtic Iron Age.

In 1351, the village was held by the Waldgraves of Kyrburg. By 1515, Schauren was still obliged to pay tithes or other levies to the Waldgraves and Rhinegraves. In 1816, in the wake of Napoleon’s downfall and the Congress of Vienna, French rule ended and Schauren found itself in the Kingdom of Prussia.

Schauren also has its industrial history. The village fields’ meagre yields spurred many men to find other work when industrialization began to make itself felt. There were ironworks of “Hammerbirkenfeld” and Asbach. There was also slate mining. The Aschiedermühle, now merely an outlying homestead, was an actual mill at one time (Mühle means “mill” in German) and contributed to the local economy.

== Politics ==
=== Municipal council ===
The council is made up of 12 council members, who were elected by majority vote at the municipal election held on 7 June 2009, and the honorary mayor as chairwoman.

=== Mayor ===
Schauren's mayor is Susanne Müller.

=== Coat of arms ===
The German blazon reads: In schräg geteiltem Schild vorne in Schwarz ein goldenes Gefäß, hinten in Gold ein blaubewehrter und -gezungter Löwe.

The municipality's arms might in English heraldic language be described thus: Per bend sable a vase Or and Or a lion rampant gules armed and langued azure.

The German blazon does not mention the lion's tincture, but going by the image used in this article, it is gules (red).

The charge on the dexter (armsbearer's right, viewer's left) side, the vase, recalls an important archaeological find in Schauren, a 38.5 cm-tall vessel unearthed at a grave from late La Tène times (late 1st century BC). The lion on the sinister (armsbearer's left, viewer's right) side is a reference to the village's former allegiance to the Waldgraviate-Rhinegraviate.

== Culture and sightseeing ==
=== Buildings ===
The following are listed buildings or sites in Rhineland-Palatinate’s Directory of Cultural Monuments:

- Evangelical parish church, Hauptstraße 21 – aisleless church with ridge turret, 1767; décor and painting; Rococo organ, 1780, ascribed to the Brothers Stumm; Gothic bell from 1480 by Cleis von Echternach, two bells from the 14th century
- Brunnenweg 2 – Evangelical rectory; building with mansard roof, timber framing partly plastered or slated, 18th century
- Hauptstraße 19 – estate complex along the street, possibly from the late 19th century; characterizes village’s appearance
- Hauptstraße 20 – house with broad gable, 19th century, remodelled in 1909; characterizes village’s appearance

The church mentioned above was built in the Baroque style, and the paintings inside were done in the “Tyrolean style”.

== Economy and infrastructure ==
=== Transport ===
South of the village runs Bundesstraße 422, and to the north runs Bundesstraße 327, known as the Hunsrückhöhenstraße (“Hunsrück Heights Road”, a scenic road across the Hunsrück built originally as a military road on Hermann Göring’s orders). The nearest railway stations are in Kirn and Idar-Oberstein. Idar-Oberstein's station, as a Regional-Express and Regionalbahn stop, is linked by way of the Nahe Valley Railway (Bingen–Saarbrücken) to the Saarland and the Frankfurt Rhine Main Region. The Rhein-Nahe-Express running the Mainz-Saarbrücken route serves the station hourly. Every other one of these trains goes through to the main railway station in Frankfurt with a stop at Frankfurt Airport. Formerly, fast trains on the Frankfurt-Paris route had a stop at Idar-Oberstein. Kirn station, too, is on the Nahe Valley Railway. Furthermore, Frankfurt-Hahn Airport lies 23 km to the north.

=== Economy ===
Of Schauren's once many gemstone businesses, only a very few have survived the shift in economic structure that this craft has been undergoing.
