= Asbach, Birkenfeld =

Asbach
- Municipality
- Coat of arms

- Location of Asbach within Birkenfeld district
- Interactive map of Asbach
- Location within Germany Location within Rhineland-Palatinate
- Coordinates: 49°48′45.51″N 7°16′43.60″E
- Country: Germany
- State: Rhineland-Palatinate
- District: Birkenfeld
- Municipal assoc.: Herrstein-Rhaunen

Government
  - Mayor (2019–24): Peter Ackermann

Area
  - Total: 3.47 km^{2} (1.34 sq mi)
- Elevation: 460 m (1,510 ft)

Population (2025-12-31)
  - Total: 130
  - Density: 37/km^{2} (97/sq mi)
- Time zone: UTC+01:00 (CET)
  - Summer (DST): UTC+02:00 (CEST)
- Postal codes: 55758
- Dialling codes: 06786
- Vehicle registration: BIR

Asbach is an Ortsgemeinde – a municipality belonging to a Verbandsgemeinde, a kind of collective municipality – in the Birkenfeld district in Rhineland-Palatinate, Germany. It belongs to the Verbandsgemeinde Herrstein-Rhaunen, whose seat is in Herrstein.

== Geography ==
=== Location ===
The municipality lies on the Hinterbach in the transitional zone between the Kempfelder Hochmulde (“high hollow”) and the Idar-Soon-Pforte (“gate”) east of the Idarwald (forest, part of the Hunsrück). The village's elevation is from 460 to 480 m above sea level.

=== Land use ===
Former agricultural uses of the municipality's rather nutrient-poor soil were mainly rye, oats, barley and root vegetables. The hollows are used as grassland on mainly gley and podzol soils. The sandy, nutrient-poor soils on the quartzite outliers of the Schwarzwälder Hochwald (forest) are used as woodlots.

=== Constituent communities ===
South of the main village lies the outlying centre of Asbacherhütte (“Asbach Ironworks”), which traces its beginnings to an iron-smelting complex. The most noteworthy building here is the former Böcking manor house. The Deutsche Edelsteinstraße (“German Gemstone Road”) leads through Asbacherhütte.

=== Neighbouring municipalities ===
Asbach's neighbours are Hellertshausen, Weiden, Hottenbach, Mörschied, Kempfeld and Schauren, all of which also lie in the Birkenfeld district.

== History ==
In the wedge of woodland between the two deep dales, scattered remnants of a number of barrows bear witness to very early human habitation going back as far as the Hunsrück-Eifel Culture in La Tène times. In the more recent past, the Asbach Ironworks down below on the Fischbach played an important rôle as a regional hub for iron smelting in the early Industrial Revolution. This hammermill, which was expanded in 1743 by the sons of the Sulzbach smith, Johann Nikolaus Stumm, became the groundwork of the Saarland metal industry. Related to the later Barons of Stumm, the legendary “Iron Barons”, were the Böckings. In 1835, Rudolf Heinrich Böcking (1810-1871) inherited the ironworks.

The StummBöcking’sches Herrenhaus (“Stumm-Böcking manor house”) and the other buildings at Asbacherhütte are nowadays home to handicapped people.

Until administrative restructuring in Rhineland-Palatinate in 1969, this Hunsrück village belonged to the Amt of Kempfeld in the now abolished Bernkastel district, whose seat was at Bernkastel-Kues.

== Politics ==
=== Municipal council ===
The council is made up of 6 council members, who were elected by majority vote at the municipal election held on 7 June 2009, and the honorary mayor as chairman.

=== Mayor ===
Asbach's mayor is Peter Ackermann.

=== Coat of arms ===
The municipality's arms might be described thus: Per bend vert a timber-frame building with a ridge turret argent with members, windows and door sable, and Or a lion rampant gules armed and langued azure.

== Culture and sightseeing ==
=== Buildings ===
The following are listed buildings or sites in Rhineland-Palatinate’s Directory of Cultural Monuments:

- Hauptstraße, graveyard – R. H. Böcking tomb, sandstone stele with relief and acroteria, 1871 by E. Renard, Cologne
- At Hauptstraße 12 – portal, marked 1878
- Hauptstraße 14 – stately house, partly timber-frame, partly slated, mansard roof, late 18th century; commercial building
- Hauptstraße 21 – belltower; timber-frame building, 1867; inside gristmill, seed cleaning machine, fruit press
- In der Treib 1 – stately house, 1848
- In der Treib 10 – estate complex along the street, after 1873
- Asbacherhütte, south of the village (monumental zone) – from the former ironworks where ore was smelted and further worked (1721 to 1872), two dwelling and administration buildings joined in a row, 18th century; deaconry institute that grew out of this: Haus „Eben Ezer“ (main house in the row with hipped mansard roof 1755, hinder part from the 18th century, further floor added in the 19th century), Haus „Grüne Aue“ (villalike, asymmetrical building, partly plastered or slated, towards 1907), landscaped garden with fencing and course of the Asbach, 19th century

== Economy and infrastructure ==
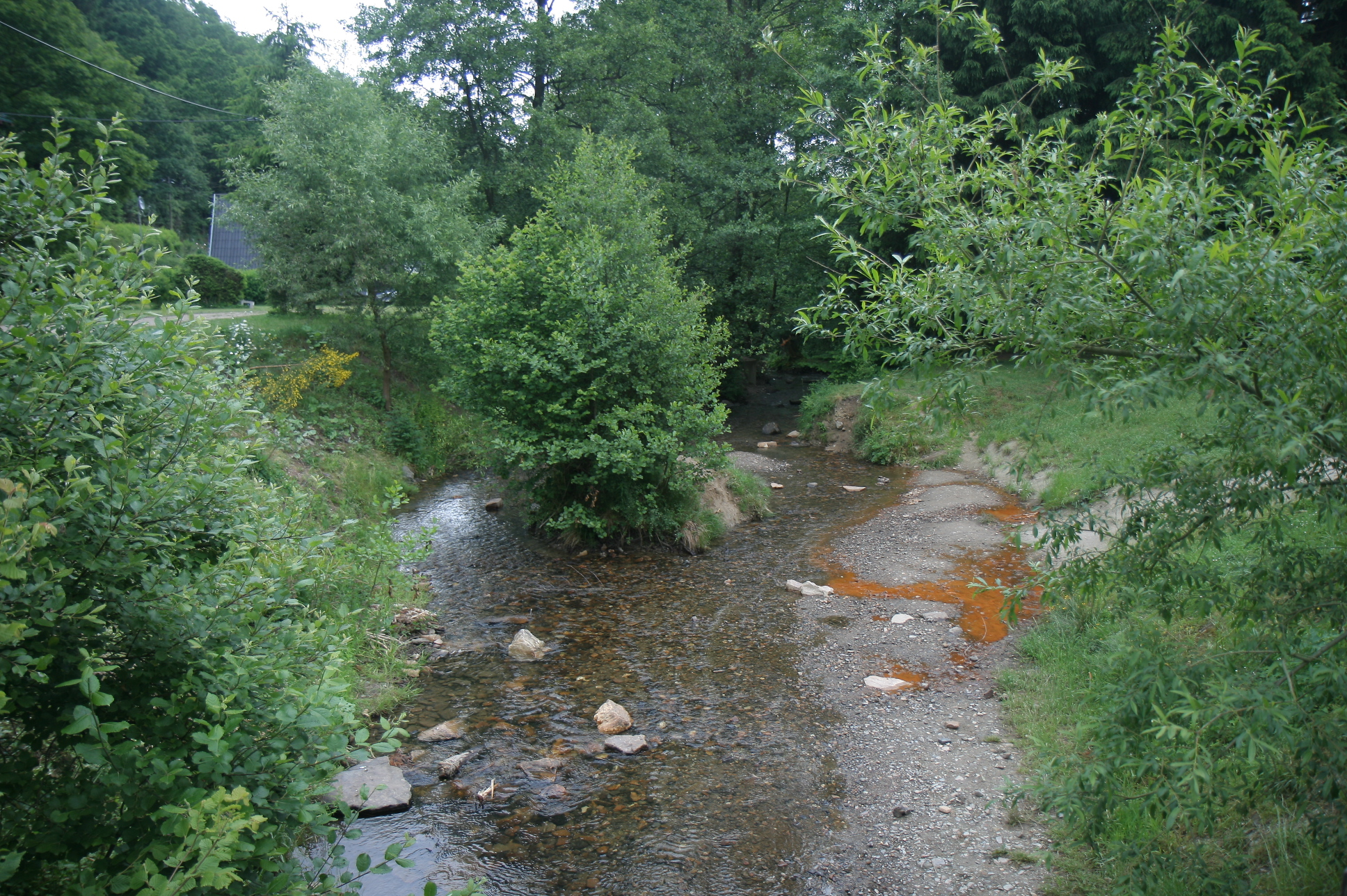
The Fischbach in Asbacherhütte

Until the 1970s, the village was wholly characterized by agriculture. But for an agate-grinding shop and an agricultural machinist’s operation, all households were more or less active in agriculture, although many only did so on the side. After a complete overhaul in the village’s structure, which also manifested itself in the late 1990s in the form of a thorough Flurbereinigung, there is now only one fulltime agricultural operation. For more than 25 years now there has been an agricultural processing plant, working under strict ecological rules, turning out high-quality products from its own farm. These are sold at markets in the surrounding area and also at the farm itself.

In the early 1990s, a village renewal scheme was carefully undertaken to improve infrastructure. These measures, funded through cost-sharing, were at first opposed by many villagers owing to the great financial burden. It soon became clear, however, that there was no alternative. The village renewal was finished with the building of a village community centre.

A few newer houses have also sprung up in the lower village as a result of a small building development zone that was opened up.

In Asbacherhütte is found a clinical-paedagogical institute run by the deaconry of Bad Kreuznach as a home for handicapped people who need minimal assistance.

=== Transport ===
To the south runs Bundesstraße 422. The nearest railway station is at Idar-Oberstein. On weekdays, Omnibus-Verkehr Rhein Nahe bus route 345 runs through Asbach, as well as several journeys of route 351. Asbach belongs to the Rhein-Nahe-Nahverkehrsverbund (“Rhine-Nahe Local Transport Network”)

== Famous people ==
=== Sons and daughters of the town ===
- Eduard Mayer, (b. 17 August 1812 in Asbacherhütte; d. 1881 in Bad Aibling), sculptor
