= Mörschied =

- Municipality
- Coat of arms

- Location of Mörschied within Birkenfeld district
- Interactive map of Mörschied
- Location within Germany Location within Rhineland-Palatinate
- Coordinates: 49°47′26″N 07°18′25″E
- Country: Germany
- State: Rhineland-Palatinate
- District: Birkenfeld
- Municipal assoc.: Herrstein-Rhaunen

Government
  - Mayor (2019–24): Harald Friedrich

Area
  - Total: 10.69 km^{2} (4.13 sq mi)
- Elevation: 420 m (1,380 ft)

Population (2025-12-31)
  - Total: 739
  - Density: 69.1/km^{2} (179/sq mi)
- Time zone: UTC+01:00 (CET)
  - Summer (DST): UTC+02:00 (CEST)
- Postal codes: 55758
- Dialling codes: 06785
- Vehicle registration: BIR
- Website: www.moerschied.de

Mörschied is an Ortsgemeinde – a municipality belonging to a Verbandsgemeinde, a kind of collective municipality – in the Birkenfeld district in Rhineland-Palatinate, Germany. It belongs to the Verbandsgemeinde Herrstein-Rhaunen, whose seat is in Herrstein.

== Geography ==
=== Location ===
The municipality lies on the Naturpark Saar-Hunsrück. The municipal area is 64% wooded. To the east lies Herrstein. The nearest major town is Idar-Oberstein to the south.

=== Constituent communities ===
Also belonging to Mörschied are the outlying homesteads of Am Herrsteinerweg, Asbacherhütte, Hahnenmühle and Harfenmühle.

== Politics ==
=== Municipal council ===
The council is made up of 12 council members, who were elected by majority vote at the municipal election held on 7 June 2009, and the honorary mayor as chairman.

=== Mayor ===
Mörschied’s mayor is Harald Friedrich.

=== Coat of arms ===
The municipality’s arms might be described thus: Per bend sinister sable issuant from the line of partition a demilion with tail bifurcated argent crowned Or and chequy gules and argent issuant from base a mount of three.

== Culture and sightseeing ==
=== Buildings ===
The following are listed buildings or sites in Rhineland-Palatinate’s Directory of Cultural Monuments:

- Evangelical church, Äckerchen – aisleless church with ridge turret, 1731-1746; décor; organ, firm of G. Stumm, 1896; two tomb slabs
- Herrsteiner Straße 11 – stately timber-frame Quereinhaus (a combination residential and commercial house divided for these two purposes down the middle, perpendicularly to the street), partly solid, partly slated, half-hipped roof, 19th century
- Herrsteiner Straße 21 – Quereinhaus, partly timber-frame (plastered), timber-frame gallery, marked 1830, conversion 1860
- Hahnenmühle, southeast of the village on the Fischbach – stately miller’s and farmer’s house, marked 1907; mill gear from time of building, bakehouse, mountain cellar
- Schleiferei Biehl (gemcutting shop), northwest of the village on the Fischbach – latter half of the 19th century, technical equipment

=== Regular events ===
Since 1990, Mörschied has had an open-air stage on which the Karl-May-Festspiele Mörschied are staged in the summer months each year. In 2010, the play Winnetou gegen Santer (gegen means “against”; both those named in the title are characters from Karl May’s writings) was produced.

== Economy and infrastructure ==
To the south runs Bundesstraße 422. Serving nearby Idar-Oberstein is a railway station that, as a Regional-Express and Regionalbahn stop, is linked by way of the Nahe Valley Railway (Bingen–Saarbrücken) to the Saarland and the Frankfurt Rhine Main Region. The Rhein-Nahe-Express running the Mainz-Saarbrücken route serves the station hourly. Every other train goes through to the main railway station in Frankfurt with a stop at Frankfurt Airport. Formerly, fast trains on the Frankfurt-Paris route had a stop at Idar-Oberstein.
